= U.S. Route 50 in Maryland =

Section of U.S. Highway in Maryland, United States

U.S. Route 50
- US 50 highlighted in red

Route information
- Maintained by MDSHA and MDTA
- Length: 149.67 mi (240.87 km)
- Existed: 1926–present
- Component highways: I-595 from New Carrollton to Annapolis (unsigned)
- Tourist routes: Harriet Tubman Underground Railroad Byway; Chesapeake Country Scenic Byway; Cape to Cape Scenic Byway

Western section
- Length: 9.17 mi (14.76 km)
- West end: US 50 at West Virginia state line near Redhouse
- Major intersections: US 219 in Redhouse
- East end: US 50 at West Virginia state line in Gorman

Eastern section
- Length: 140.50 mi (226.11 km)
- West end: US 50 at the DC border near Cheverly
- Major intersections: MD 201 / MD 295 / MD 459 near Cheverly; I-95 / I-495 near New Carrollton; US 301 / MD 3 in Bowie; I-97 in Annapolis; US 301 in Queenstown; MD 404 near Wye Mills; US 13 in Salisbury; MD 90 near Berlin; US 113 in Berlin
- East end: MD 528 in Ocean City (start of westbound); MD 378 in Ocean City (end of eastbound)

Location
- Country: United States
- State: Maryland
- Counties: Garrett; Prince George's, Anne Arundel, Queen Anne's, Talbot, Dorchester, Wicomico, Worcester

Highway system
- United States Numbered Highway System; List; Special; Divided; Maryland highway system; Interstate; US; State; Scenic Byways
← MD 49	→ MD 51
← MD 594	I-595	→ MD 607

U.S. Route 50 (US 50) (also called Ocean Gateway) is a major east–west route of the U.S. Highway system, stretching just over 3,000 miles (4,800 km) from West Sacramento, California, east to Ocean City, Maryland, on the Atlantic Ocean. In the state of Maryland, US 50 exists in two sections. The longer of these serves as a major route connecting Washington, DC, with Ocean City, which is the eastern terminus of the highway. The other section passes through the southern end of Garrett County for less than 10 miles (16 km) as part of the Northwestern Turnpike, entering West Virginia at both ends. One notable section of US 50 is the dual-span Chesapeake Bay Bridge across the Chesapeake Bay, which links the Baltimore–Washington metropolitan area with the Eastern Shore region, allowing motorists to reach Ocean City and the Delaware Beaches.

US 50 has received numerous upgrades during its existence in Maryland, including the construction of the John Hanson Highway, a portion of which is also the unsigned Interstate 595 (I-595), its extension onto the Eastern Shore and replacement of US 213 due to the construction of the Chesapeake Bay Bridge, and the full conversion of the eastern segment of the route into a four-lane divided highway. Many of the older alignments of US 50 are still part of the Maryland and US highway systems, such as US 50 Business (US 50 Bus.) in Salisbury. US 50 continues to be upgraded on the Eastern Shore.

== Route description ==
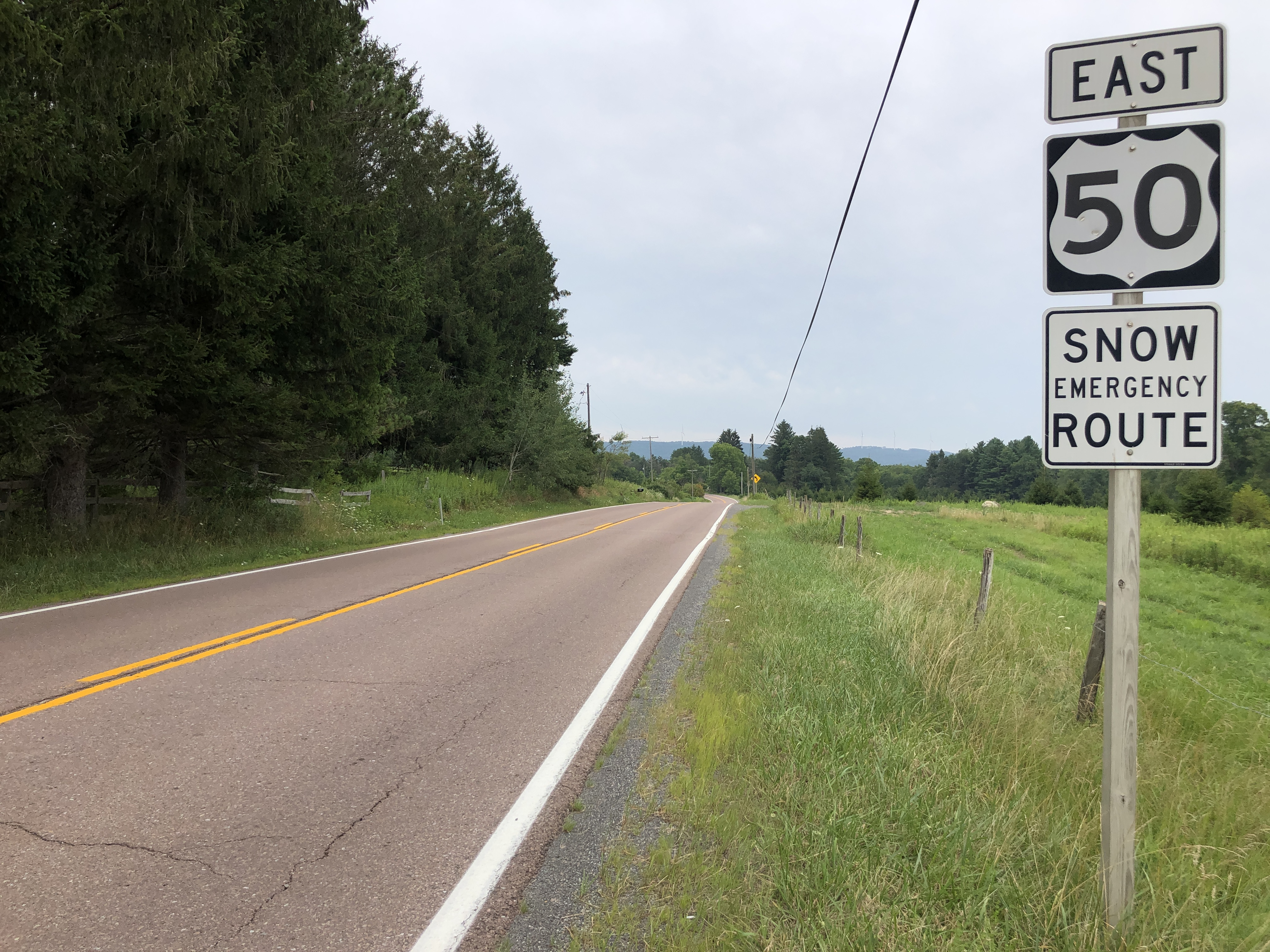
US 50 eastbound past the West Virginia state line in Garrett County

US 50 has two segments located in the state of Maryland totaling 149.67 mi (240.87 km). The 9.17-mile (14.76 km) western segment is a two-lane undivided road through rural mountain areas in Garrett County, heading into West Virginia at both ends. The 140.50-mile (226.11 km) eastern segment runs between the Washington, DC, border in Prince George's County and the eastern terminus of the route at MD 528 and MD 378 in Ocean City as a multilane divided highway with some freeway segments. Between Washington, DC, and Annapolis, US 50 follows a freeway called the John Hanson Highway, which is designated as unsigned I-595 between the interchanges with I-95/I-495 (the Capital Beltway) in New Carrollton and MD 70 in Annapolis. In Bowie, US 301 becomes concurrent with US 50 and unsigned I-595. East of Annapolis, US 50/US 301 continue east along a freeway called the Blue Star Memorial Highway. The two routes pass over the Chesapeake Bay on the Chesapeake Bay Bridge, linking the Western Shore and the Eastern Shore regions. After the bridge, US 50/US 301 head east across Kent Island before the freeway ends and the two routes split in Queenstown. From here, US 50 becomes an at-grade divided highway called Ocean Gateway and runs through rural areas of the Eastern Shore, heading south through Easton to Cambridge. The route turns southeast in Cambridge and continues through more rural land to Salisbury, which it bypasses to the north on a freeway called the Salisbury Bypass, a bypass road partly shared with US 13. Past Salisbury, US 50 becomes an at-grade divided highway again and continues east along the Ocean Gateway to Ocean City.

US 50 serves as the main route between the Baltimore–Washington Metropolitan Area and the Eastern Shore, providing access to Ocean City and, by way of MD 404 and Delaware Route 404 (DE 404), the Delaware Beaches. As such, the route experiences heavy traffic in the summer months, with major congestion points including the Pearl Harbor Memorial Bridge over the Severn River in Annapolis, the Chesapeake Bay Bridge toll plaza, Easton, Cambridge, and the few miles leading into Ocean City. The peak travel periods in the summer are eastbound on Friday evenings, both directions on Saturday afternoons, and westbound on Sunday afternoons. The route is also a designated hurricane evacuation route out of Ocean City. US 50 in Maryland is a part of the main National Highway System between the Washington, DC border and the eastern terminus in Ocean City.

US 50/I-595 has a high-occupancy vehicle lane (HOV lane) for carpools with 2 or more persons in each direction from west of I-95/I-495 to east of US 301, a distance of 7.5 miles (12.1 km). Unlike other HOV lanes in the Washington metropolitan area, which are only restricted during rush hours, the HOV lanes on US 50/I-595 are restricted at all times.

=== Garrett County ===
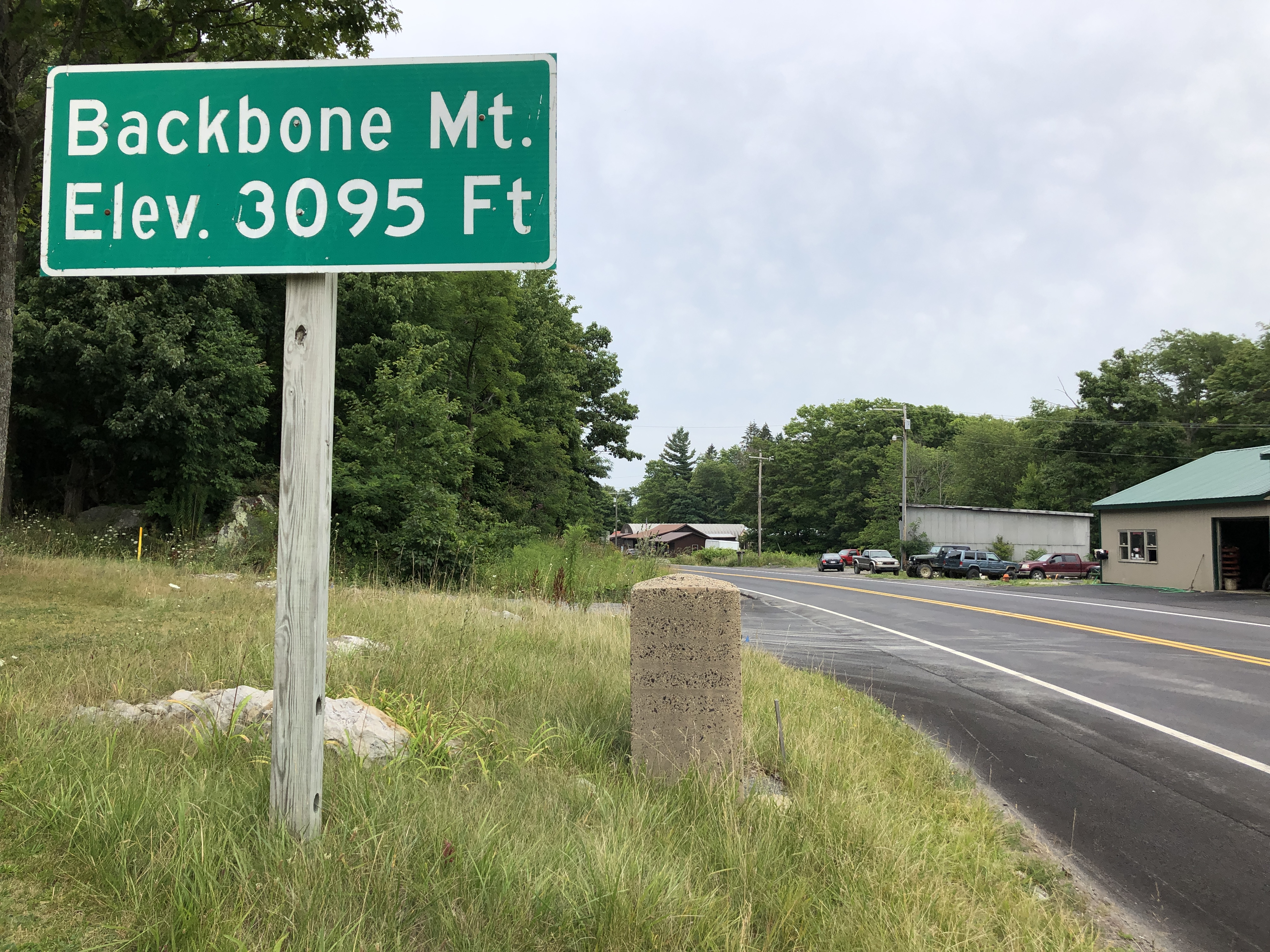
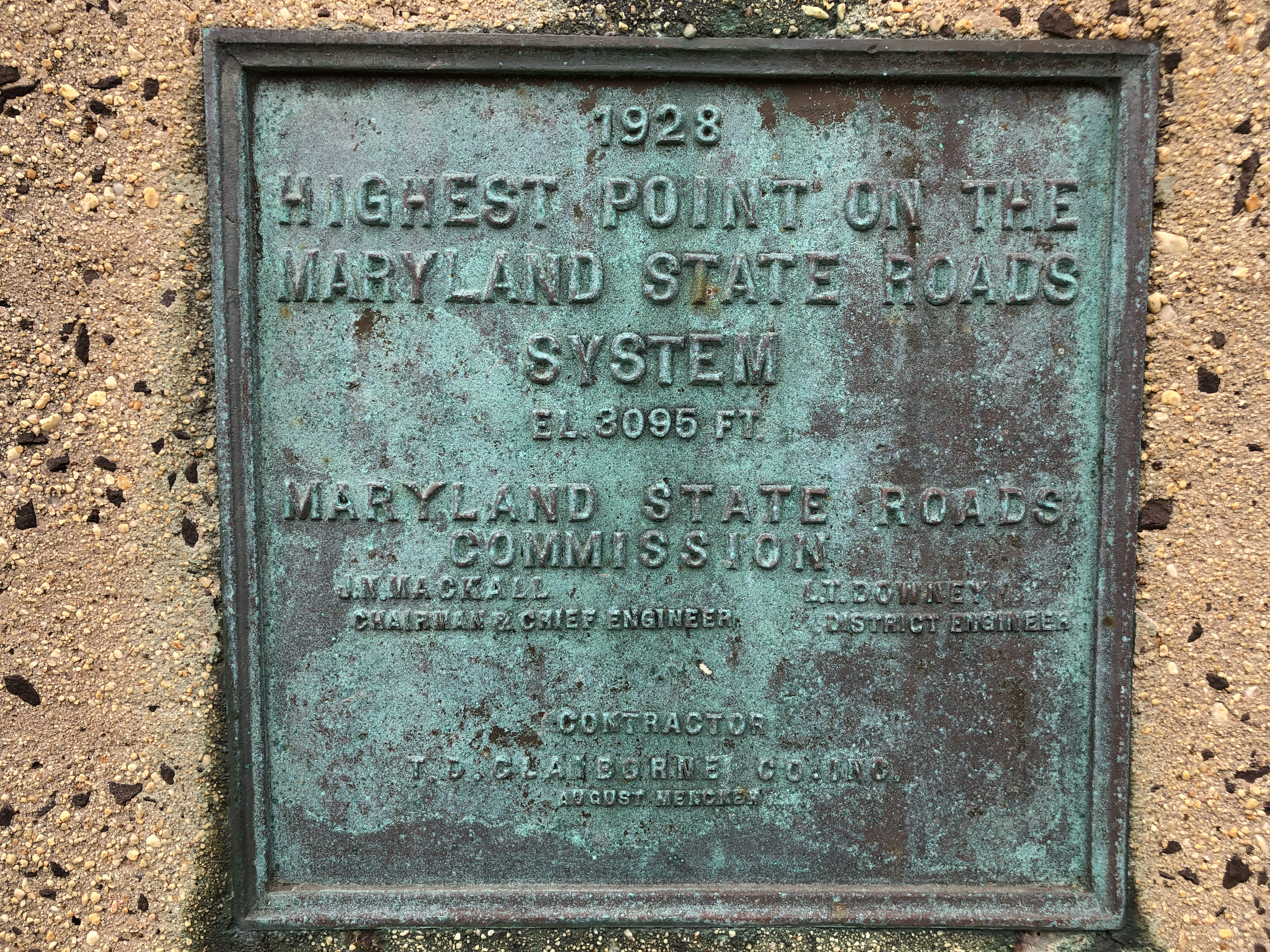
US 50 crosses the highest point in the Maryland state highway system on Backbone Mountain in Garrett County

US 50 leaves Preston County in West Virginia and enters the state of Maryland in Garrett County. US 50 is routed along the old Northwestern Turnpike, presently named George Washington Highway after George Washington. The route heads southeast from the state line as a two-lane undivided road that passes through a mix of farmland and woods with some homes. The road curves east before it turns back to the southeast and comes to an intersection with US 219 in Redhouse. Past this intersection, US 50 runs through more farm fields before it heads into forests and ascends Backbone Mountain, turning northeast. The route passes some development at the summit, which is the highest point in the Maryland state highway system at an elevation of 3,095 feet (943 m), before it descends the mountain, curving to the east. The road heads through forested areas with a few homes before passing fields. The route runs southeast through more woods and makes a sharp turn to the north. US 50 reaches an intersection with the southern terminus of MD 560 in Gorman and turns east to come to a bridge over CSX's Thomas Subdivision railroad line and the North Branch Potomac River. At this point, US 50 leaves Maryland and heads back into West Virginia at Gormania.

=== Prince George's County ===
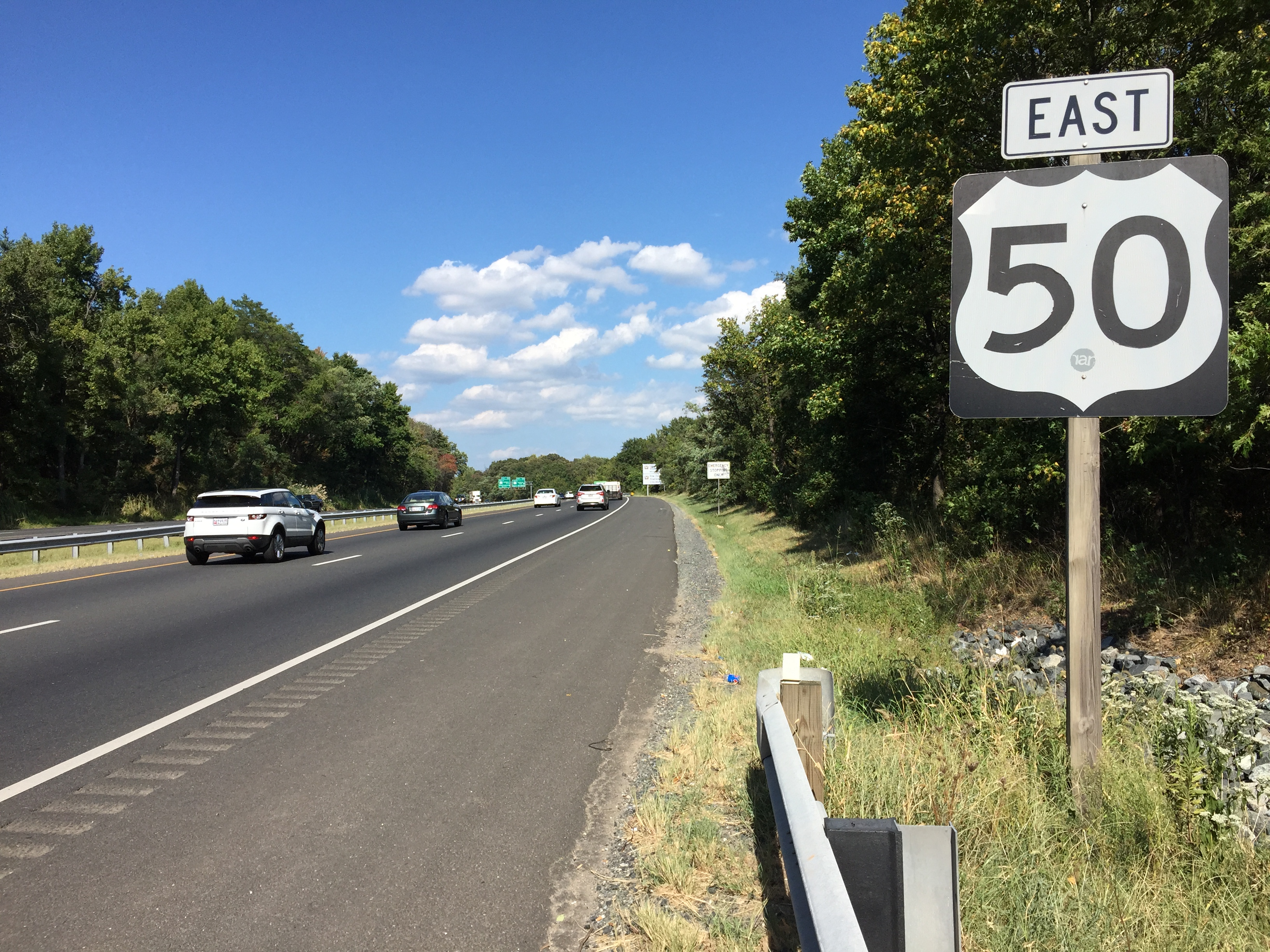
View east along US 50 between the MD 459 and MD 202 interchanges in Cheverly

US 50 passes through West Virginia, Virginia, and Washington, DC, before it crosses back into Maryland at the eastern border of Washington, DC From here, the route continues west into Washington, DC, as New York Avenue. From the Washington, DC, border, US 50 heads into Prince George's County as the John Hanson Highway, a six-lane freeway. The road soon intersects the southern terminus of the Baltimore–Washington Parkway (unsigned MD 295) and MD 201 (which heads south to the Washington, DC, border and becomes District of Columbia Route 295) at a hybrid interchange with a full cloverleaf and partial-Y elements. Following this, the US 50 freeway narrows to four lanes and heads east, running between MD 459 and an industrial area to the north and Amtrak's Northeast Corridor railroad line to the south and passing under the Alexandria Extension of CSX's Capital Subdivision railroad line. The road enters Cheverly and comes to an interchange with the southern terminus of MD 459 and Columbia Park Road that provides access to the Cheverly station along Washington Metro's Orange Line to the south; this interchange does not have a westbound exit. Past this interchange, the route curves northeast and runs between residential neighborhoods to the northwest and the Northeast Corridor and Orange Line tracks to the southeast. The freeway leaves Cheverly and comes to the MD 202 exit, which is a combination of partial cloverleaf and trumpet interchanges. US 50 continues through suburban areas alongside the railroad tracks, passing near the Landover station along the Orange Line that can be accessed from MD 202. The road heads through a section of Landover Hills and widens to six lanes, reaching a diamond interchange with MD 410. Past this interchange, the freeway turns east and passes over Amtrak's Northeast Corridor and Washington Metro's Orange Line. The route comes to an interchange with Garden City Drive (MD 950) and Ardwick Ardmore Road (US 50PA) that provides access to the New Carrollton station serving Amtrak trains, MARC's Penn Line, and the terminus of Washington Metro's Orange Line to the north of the road; this interchange does not have an eastbound exit. Following this interchange, US 50 passes office parks and industrial development in New Carrollton. The highway reaches a hybrid turbine interchange with I-95/I-495, the Capital Beltway.

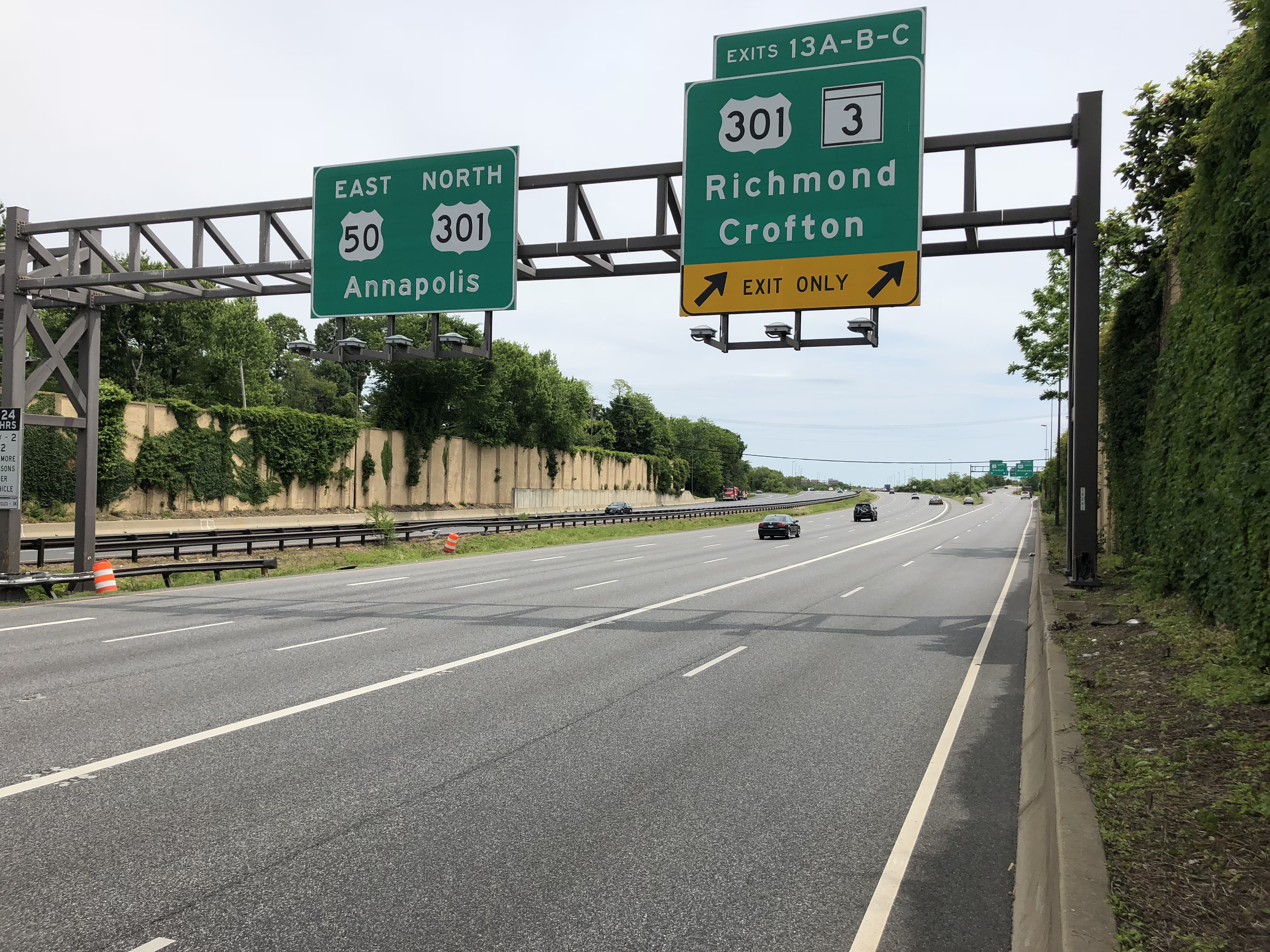
View east along US 50 and unsigned I-595 at the interchange with US 301 and MD 3 in Bowie

At the I-95/I-495 interchange, the US 50 freeway becomes part of the Interstate Highway System as I-595, which is an unsigned highway. The road heads east as a ten-lane freeway, with the left lane in each direction designated as a HOV lane for carpools with 2 or more persons that is in operation 24 hours a day. The freeway passes near residential development and comes to a partial cloverleaf interchange with MD 704 near Lanham. After this interchange, the highway narrows to eight lanes, with the left lanes remaining an HOV lane, and runs between commercial development to the north and housing subdivisions to the south. US 50 continues east through woodland with nearby residential areas, passing over MD 193 without an interchange. Farther east, the route runs through wooded areas with more scattered residential development, heading to the north of Freeway Airport. The road turns to the northeast and comes to a bridge over CSX's Pope's Creek Subdivision railroad line before it crosses into Bowie and reaches the MD 197 exit, which is a partial cloverleaf interchange. Past here, US 50 curves east and runs between residential neighborhoods before it comes to a modified cloverleaf interchange with US 301 and the southern terminus of MD 3. At this interchange, the HOV lanes end and US 301 heads east concurrent with US 50 and unsigned I-595 on the freeway, which narrows to six lanes. The road passes south of an industrial park before it leaves Bowie and enters woodland, coming to a bridge over the Patuxent River.

=== Anne Arundel County ===
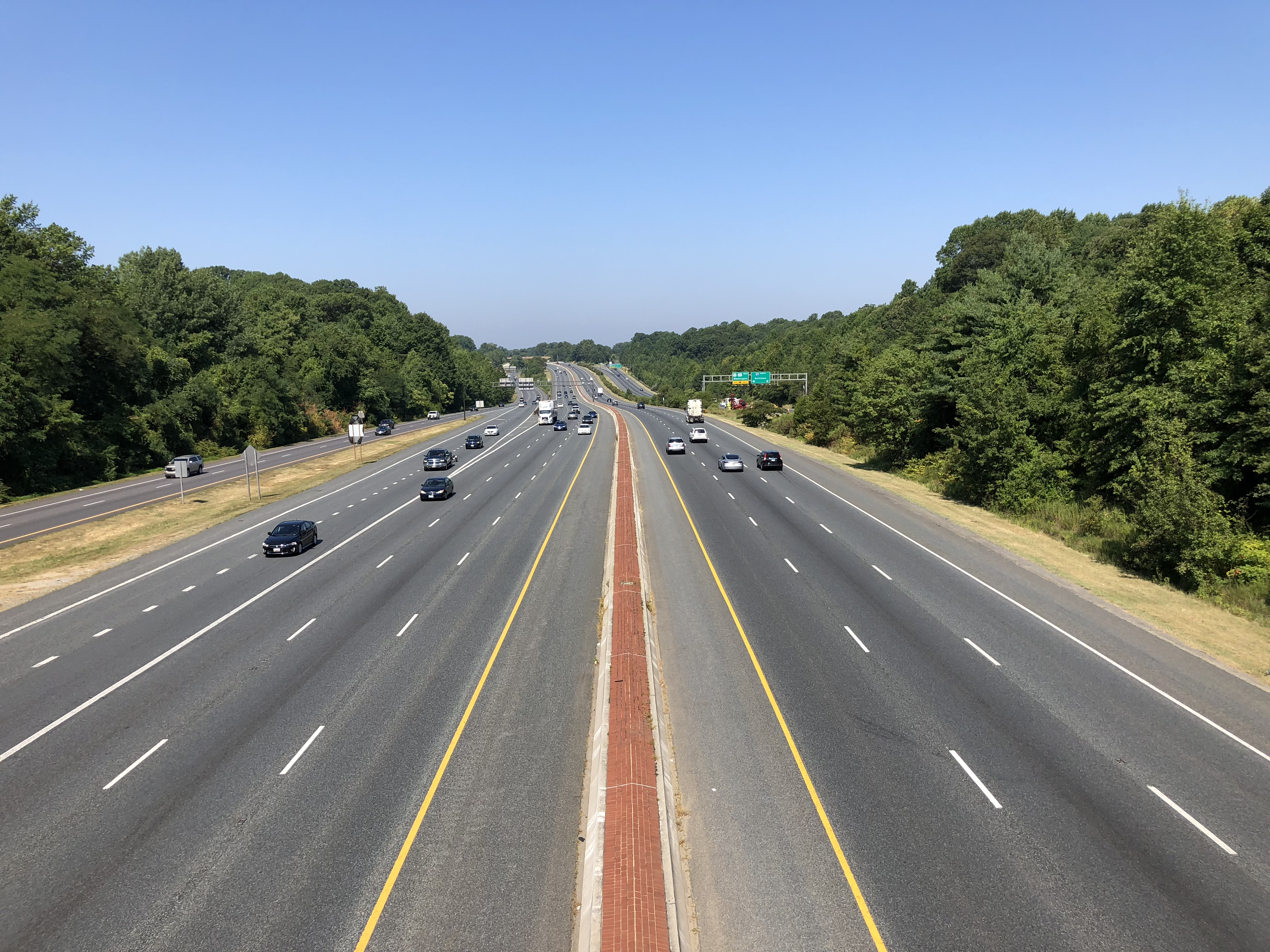
US 50 westbound/US 301 southbound and unsigned I-595 westbound at the MD 665 exit in Parole

U.S. Route 50 in Annapolis, from Broad Creek to Jennifer Road, in June 2026.

Upon crossing the Patuxent River, US 50/US 301 and unsigned I-595 head into Anne Arundel County and continue through wooded areas with some farm fields, bending to the east-northeast. The road comes to a partial cloverleaf interchange with MD 424 to the north of Davidsonville. From here, the freeway runs through forested areas with some nearby housing developments, crossing the South River. The freeway curves to the east and heads near more dense residential development before it reaches a directional T interchange with the southern terminus of I-97, which leads north toward Baltimore. Past this interchange, the ramps leading to and from I-97 run parallel to US 50/US 301 to an interchange with the western terminus of MD 665, which runs southeast into Annapolis as a short freeway spur. From here, the highway heads into Parole and runs through a business area, coming to a partial cloverleaf interchange with MD 450, which leads into downtown Annapolis, to the south of the Annapolis Mall. The freeway soon intersects MD 2 at a partial cloverleaf interchange at Solomons Island Road. At this point, MD 2 joins US 50/US 301 and unsigned I-595 on the John Hanson Highway. The road heads northeast through wooded areas before coming to an interchange with MD 70 that serves downtown Annapolis. At this interchange, the unsigned I-595 designation ends, while US 50/US 301/MD 2 continue northeast on the John Hanson Highway.

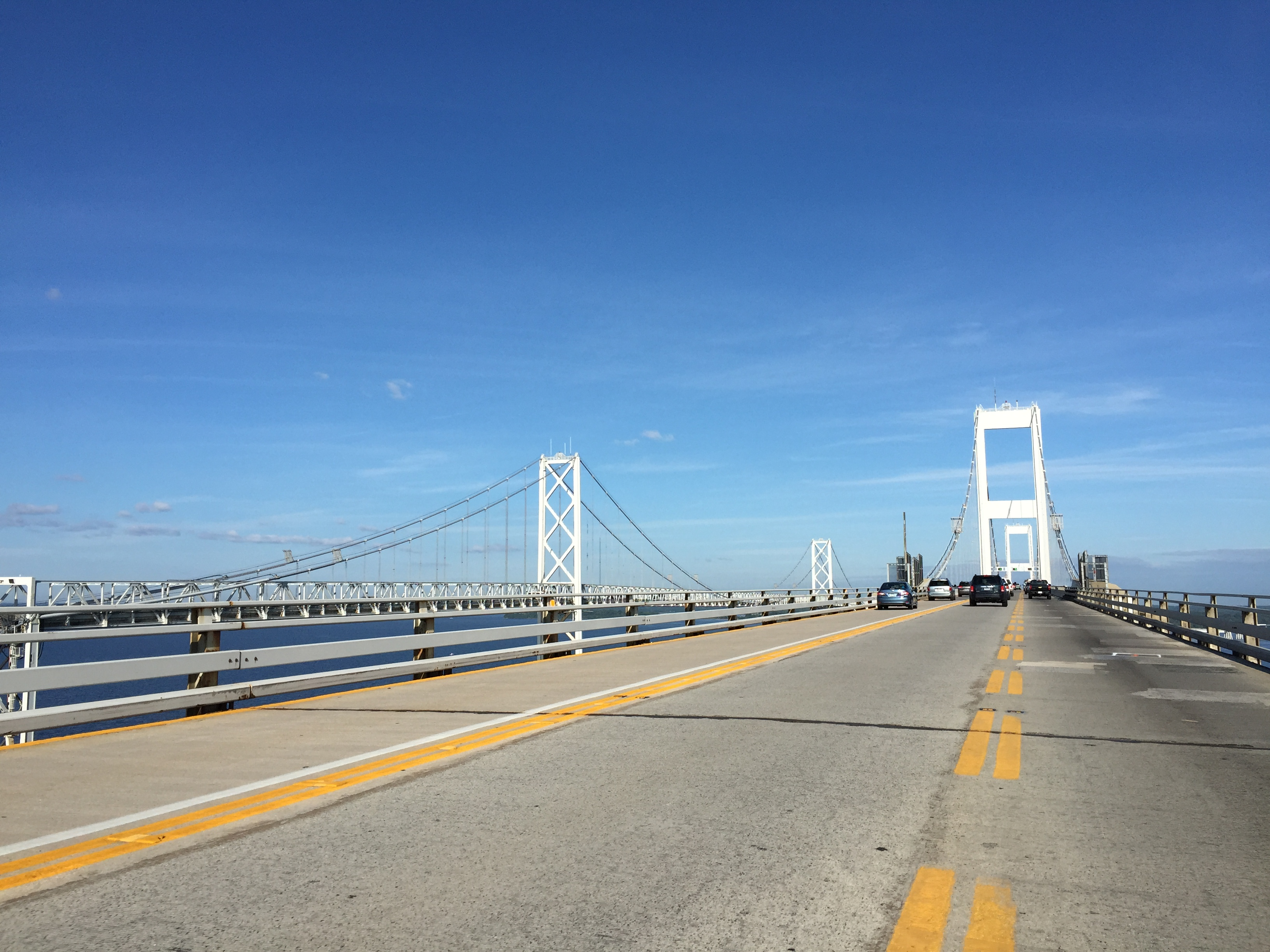
US 50 westbound/US 301 southbound over the Chesapeake Bay via the Chesapeake Bay Bridge

The route passes under MD 436 and runs near residential neighborhoods before crossing over the Severn River on the Pearl Harbor Memorial Bridge. After crossing the Severn River, the road comes to an interchange with the Governor Ritchie Highway. Here, MD 2 leaves US 50/US 301 by heading north on the Governor Ritchie Highway toward Baltimore while MD 450 continues south into Annapolis on that road, providing access to the United States Naval Academy. Past this interchange, US 50/US 301 become Blue Star Memorial Highway and pass to the south of Arnold, coming to a westbound right-in/right-out (RIRO) intersection serving MD 648 and continuing northeast through wooded areas with some businesses adjacent to the road. The freeway comes to the Bay Dale Drive exit before it runs through woods and curves to the east. The road becomes paralleled by Buschs Frontage Road (MD 908A), a frontage road, to the south prior to reaching an interchange with MD 179 to the south of Cape St. Claire. Past this interchange, the US 50/US 301 freeway is paralleled by the East College Parkway (MD 908B) frontage road to the north and the Whitehall Road (MD 908C) frontage road to the south as it passes a few businesses, coming to an eastbound exit and entrance connecting to Whitehall Road. The route continues through woodland with a residential neighborhood to the north before it heads to the north of a shopping center and reaches an eastbound RIRO intersection serving Whitehall Road. The road runs through more woodland with some homes before it turns southeast and comes to a modified cloverleaf interchange with Oceanic Drive (MD 908D) in Skidmore that provides access to Sandy Point State Park to the east. Following this interchange, maintenance of the road changes from the Maryland State Highway Administration to the Maryland Transportation Authority and it reaches a westbound weigh station. From here, US 50/US 301 continue southeast and head onto the Chesapeake Bay Bridge, which soon curves to the east as it passes over the Chesapeake Bay. The bridge is a dual-span crossing with an eastbound suspension and cantilever span and westbound suspension and through arch span, carrying two eastbound lanes and three westbound lanes that can be reversed to allow for two-way traffic on one span by way of crossovers on either side of the bridge.

=== Queen Anne's County ===
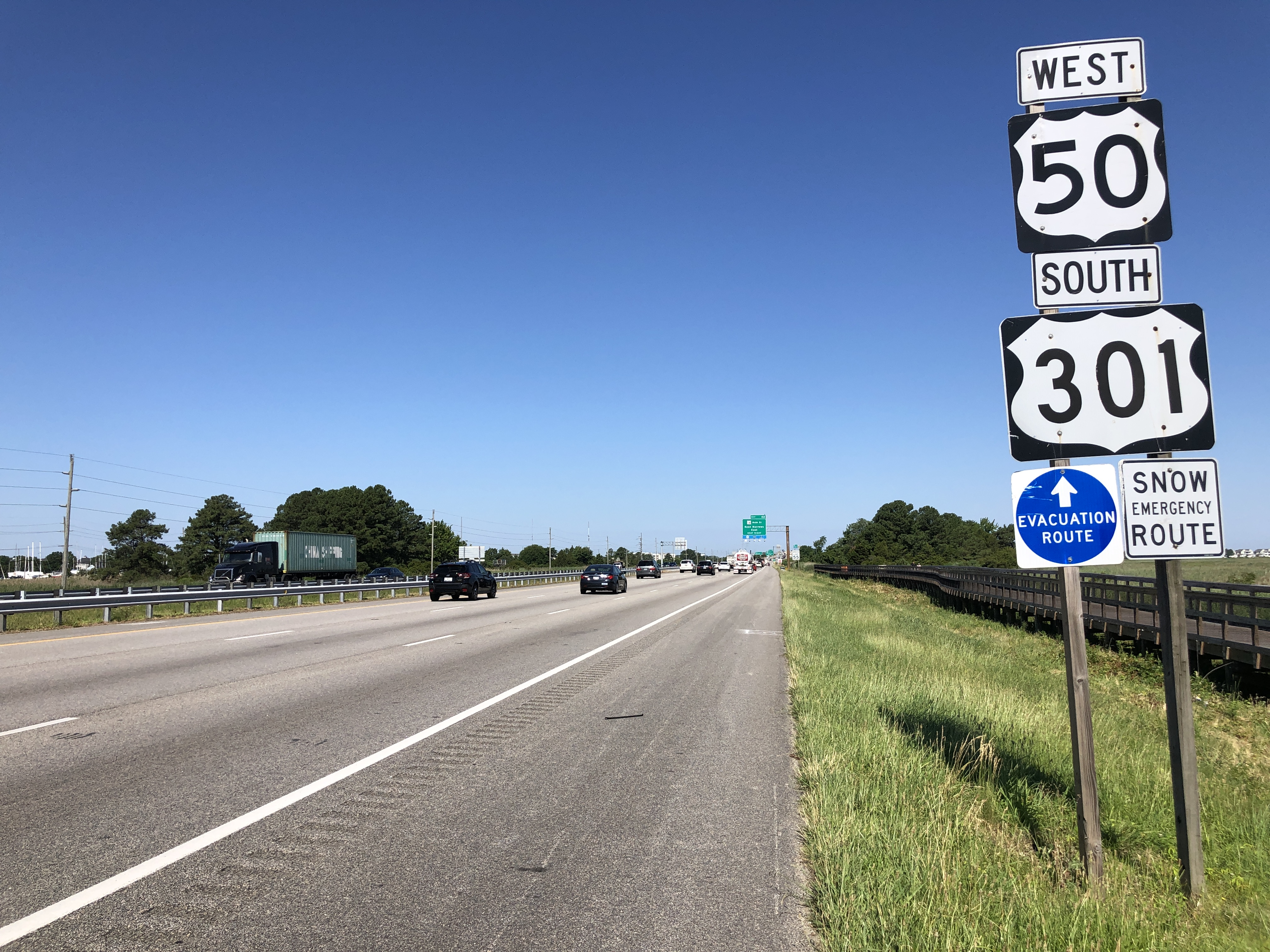
US 50 westbound/US 301 southbound in Kent Narrows

After crossing the Chesapeake Bay on the Chesapeake Bay Bridge, US 50/US 301 head onto Kent Island in Queen Anne's County, entering the Eastern Shore region of the state. The road continues east as the Blue Star Memorial Highway, a six-lane freeway, and passes through an eastbound all-electronic toll gantry before maintenance returns to the Maryland State Highway Administration. The freeway comes to a diamond interchange with MD 8 and heads to the south of Stevensville through business areas, with MD 835A parallel to the south. The route reaches an eastbound RIRO intersection with Thompson Creek Road and a westbound RIRO intersection with Duke Street. From here, US 50/US 301 head east across Cox Creek and run between businesses to the north and residential areas to the south in Chester, with a westbound exit and entrance with the US50QC frontage road providing access to the businesses. The highway comes to an eastbound RIRO intersection with Cox Neck Road and a westbound RIRO intersection with Castle Marina Road (MD 18H), the latter of which provides access to MD 18 to the north. The road continues through commercial areas and passes under MD 18 before it comes to an eastbound RIRO intersection with the northern terminus of MD 552 and a westbound RIRO intersection with Chester Station Road (MD 552A), with Chester Station Road providing a connection to Piney Creek Road. The freeway runs between woods and marshes to the north and businesses to the south prior to an eastbound RIRO intersection with South Piney Road and a westbound RIRO intersection with Piney Creek Road. The route passes near more development and comes to an eastbound RIRO intersection with Dundee Avenue before a bridge over Piney Creek. US 50/US 301 reaches an interchange with MD 18, with access to and from the westbound lanes provided by Piney Narrows Road. Following this interchange, the freeway heads across the Kent Narrows on the Kent Narrows Bridge, with MD 18 parallel to the south.

At this point, the route heads onto the mainland and passes between two marinas before it comes to an eastbound RIRO intersection with Seward Marina Road (MD 835) and a westbound RIRO intersection with Kent Narrows Road (MD 835G), both providing access to MD 18, in the community of Kent Narrows. The road passes through marshland before heading near homes and businesses and reaching an eastbound RIRO intersection with MD 18F, which connects to MD 18, and a westbound RIRO intersection with Jackson Creek Road (MD 18U) in Grasonville. US 50/US 301 continue east past development and come to an interchange with Chester River Beach Road (MD 18V); this interchange does not have a westbound exit. From here, the freeway runs through wooded areas prior to reaching an eastbound RIRO intersection with Station Lane (MD 18I) and a westbound RIRO intersection with VFW Avenue (MD 18W). The road curves northeast and heads near residential and commercial areas, with an eastbound RIRO intersection at Evans Avenue (MD 18Z) before an eastbound RIRO intersection at Hess Road (MD 18X) and a westbound RIRO intersection at Hissey Road (MD 835I). The route reaches an interchange with Nesbit Road (MD 835K), which serves the University of Maryland Shore Emergency Center at Queenstown and the University of Maryland Shore Medical Pavilion at Queenstown to the south of the road, before it runs through woodland. US 50 and US 301 split at a half-trumpet interchange near Queenstown, with US 301 continuing northeast along the carriageways on the Blue Star Memorial Highway towards Delaware.

Ocean Gateway sign used along US 50

Upon splitting from US 301, US 50 heads east as the Ocean Gateway, a four-lane, at-grade divided highway. A short distance after the US 301 split, the route comes to an intersection with MD 18. The road runs between the Queenstown Premium Outlets to the north and a few businesses to the south before it heads into wooded areas with some farm fields. US 50 curves to the east-southeast and reaches a junction with the southern terminus of MD 456. The road continues southeast through agricultural areas with some woods and homes. Farther southeast, the route comes to an intersection with the northern terminus of MD 662, which leads south into Wye Mills. US 50 bends to the east-southeast and continues through farmland, passing to the north of Chesapeake College before it reaches the junction with MD 213, which heads south to Wye Mills and north to provide access to US 301 and the towns of Centreville and Chestertown. Following this, the road curves southeast as it runs through a mix of farm fields and woodland. The route turns due south and comes to an intersection with MD 404, which heads west to Wye Mills and east to provide access to Denton and, along with DE 404, the Delaware Beaches. This intersection has park and ride lots on the northwest and northeast corners.

=== Talbot County ===
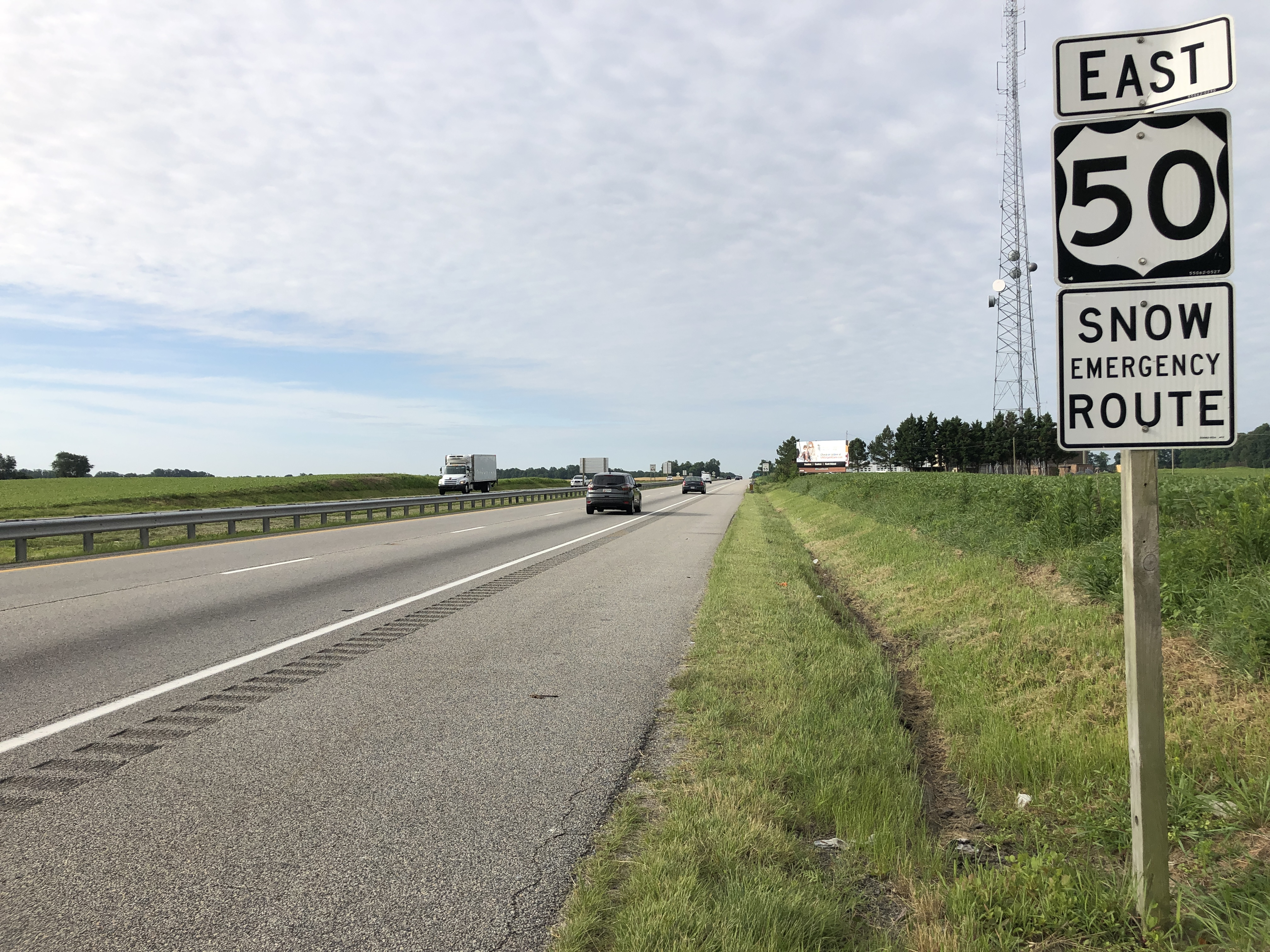
US 50 eastbound past MD 404 near Wye Mills

Upon crossing MD 404, US 50 enters Talbot County and continues due south through open agricultural areas with a few homes. The road runs through a mix of farmland and woodland and reaches an intersection with the south end of the Wye Mills segment of MD 662. A short distance later, another section of MD 662 branches southeast from the route to head into Skipton. US 50 continues through farm fields and woods with some residential and commercial development, crossing MD 662. The road heads south through more rural land with occasional development to the east of Longwoods. Farther south, the route passes to the west of a golf course before it enters Easton. At this point, US 50 becomes closely parallel with MD 662 to the west and reaches an intersection with the southern terminus of MD 309. Past this intersection, the road heads between MD 662 and the Easton Airport to the west and commercial development to the east. MD 662 curves away to the west and the route runs between residences to the west and businesses to the east. The median of US 50 widens as it reaches an intersection with the northern terminus of MD 322, which serves as a western bypass of Easton and provides access from US 50 to the western Talbot County communities of Oxford, St. Michaels, and Tilghman Island. Following this intersection, the road crosses an abandoned railroad grade owned by the Maryland Department of Transportation before the median of the route narrows again and it passes through a mix of farm fields and commercial development. The road widens to six lanes and becomes lined with businesses as it heads through the eastern part of Easton, coming to an intersection with the western terminus of MD 328. Farther south, US 50 reaches a junction with the northern terminus of MD 331. Following this intersection, the roadway runs through residential and commercial areas, narrowing to four lanes. The route continues past more businesses, bending to the south-southwest, before it heads to the east of Easton High School. US 50 passes through a mix of fields and commercial areas before reaching a junction with the southern terminus of the MD 322 western bypass of Easton.

At this point, the route leaves Easton and heads south through a mix of farmland and woodland with some businesses. US 50 has an intersection with the northern terminus of MD 565, which runs north-south to the west of US 50. The road continues south-southeast through a mix of agricultural areas and woods with some homes and businesses. Farther south, the route curves to the south and enters Trappe, heading through residential and commercial areas in the eastern part of the town. At the south end of Trappe, US 50 intersects Main Street, which heads north through the center of town and becomes MD 565 on the northern edge. From here, the road leaves Trappe and runs south through a mix of farmland and woodland. The route curves southeast as it continues through rural land. US 50 turns to the south-southwest and passes through a mix of fields and woods with some homes before it comes to the Choptank River. Here, the route intersects Marina Drive (MD 954A), which provides access to a marina on the river to the west of the road. US 50 passes over the wide Choptank River on the Senator Frederick C. Malkus Bridge. Located parallel to the east of the bridge is Bill Burton Fishing Pier State Park, which consists of the former two-lane US 50 bridge over the river that was converted into two fishing piers, with the center section of the bridge removed.

=== Dorchester County ===
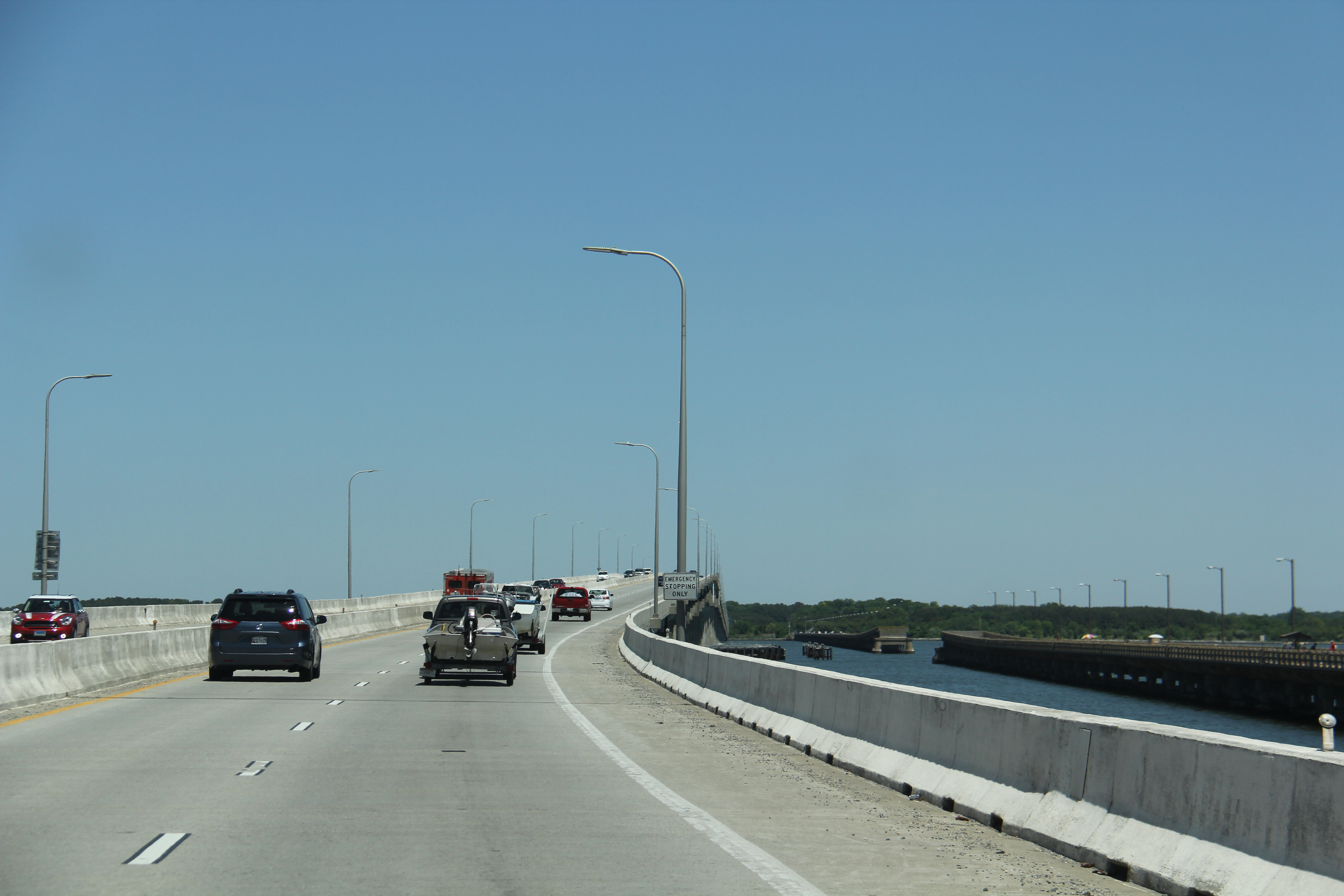
US 50 westbound on the Senator Frederick C. Malkus Bridge over the Choptank River, with Bill Burton Fishing Pier State Park visible to the right

After passing over the Choptank River on the Senator Frederick C. Malkus Bridge, US 50 enters Cambridge in Dorchester County and becomes Sunburst Highway, a six-lane divided road that is lined with businesses, heading to the east of the downtown area. The route curves to the southeast and reaches an intersection with the eastern terminus of MD 343. The road passes more commercial development before it leaves Cambridge at the Woods Road intersection, where the name returns to Ocean Gateway. US 50 runs between a golf course and resort to the north and businesses to the south before it comes to a junction with MD 16. At this point, MD 16 turns east for a concurrency with US 50 and the road continues east near businesses. The road intersects the western terminus of MD 750, a former alignment of the route that loops to the north, at which point it narrows to four lanes. The route continues past a mix of homes and businesses, coming to the eastern terminus of MD 750. From here, Aireys Spur Road loops to the south and the road runs east through a mix of farmland and development. MD 16 splits from US 50 by heading northeast on Mount Holly Road toward East New Market.

From here, US 50 continues east through a mix of farm fields and woodland with some residential and commercial development, with Chateau Drive looping to the south and then Hicksburg Road looping to the north. The route curves to the southeast and reaches Linkwood, where Vincent Road runs parallel to the west and the route passes businesses, crossing the Maryland and Delaware Railroad's Seaford Line at-grade. The road traverses more farmland and woods southwest of the Linkwood Wildlife Management Area. US 50 curves to the east, with Mill Road looping to the northeast, and passes north of Salem, with Salem Road looping south to serve that community. The route continues through rural land, with Maiden Forest Road looping to the north and the highway making a turn to the southeast. Farther southeast, the road comes to an eastbound exit and entrance with Old Ocean Gateway, which heads southeast into Vienna. At this point, US 50 curves east into wooded areas and bypasses Vienna to the north. The route comes to a partial cloverleaf interchange with the southern terminus of MD 331 that provides access to Vienna. Following this, the road passes over MD 331 and an abandoned railroad right-of-way owned by Delmarva Power and Light Company before it heads through fields to the south of a lake, curving to the southeast. The route crosses over the Nanticoke River on the Nanticoke River Memorial Bridge.

=== Wicomico County ===
Upon crossing the Nanticoke River, US 50 heads into Wicomico County and runs through marshland before heading into forests and turning to the south. The route intersects Old Bradley Road (MD 731C), which provides access to an eastbound inspection station for buses and trucks. The road has an intersection with Marsh Road (MD 731A), a one-way road coming from the inspection station, and curves to the southeast. US 50 continues through a mix of farmland and woodland with some residential and commercial development, turning to the east as it passes north of a roadside picnic area. The route heads into Mardela Springs and passes to the north of the residential areas of the town. US 50 reaches an intersection with the southern terminus of MD 313, which heads east a short distance to the western terminus of MD 54 before turning north. From here, the road leaves Mardela Springs and runs through more rural land with some development. The route passes through open agricultural areas with some woodland and homes, curving to the southeast. US 50 intersects the northern terminus of MD 347, which heads southwest into Hebron. A short distance later, the route has a junction with the eastern terminus of MD 670, which leads west into Hebron. From here, the road runs through more rural areas with some residences and commercial establishments.

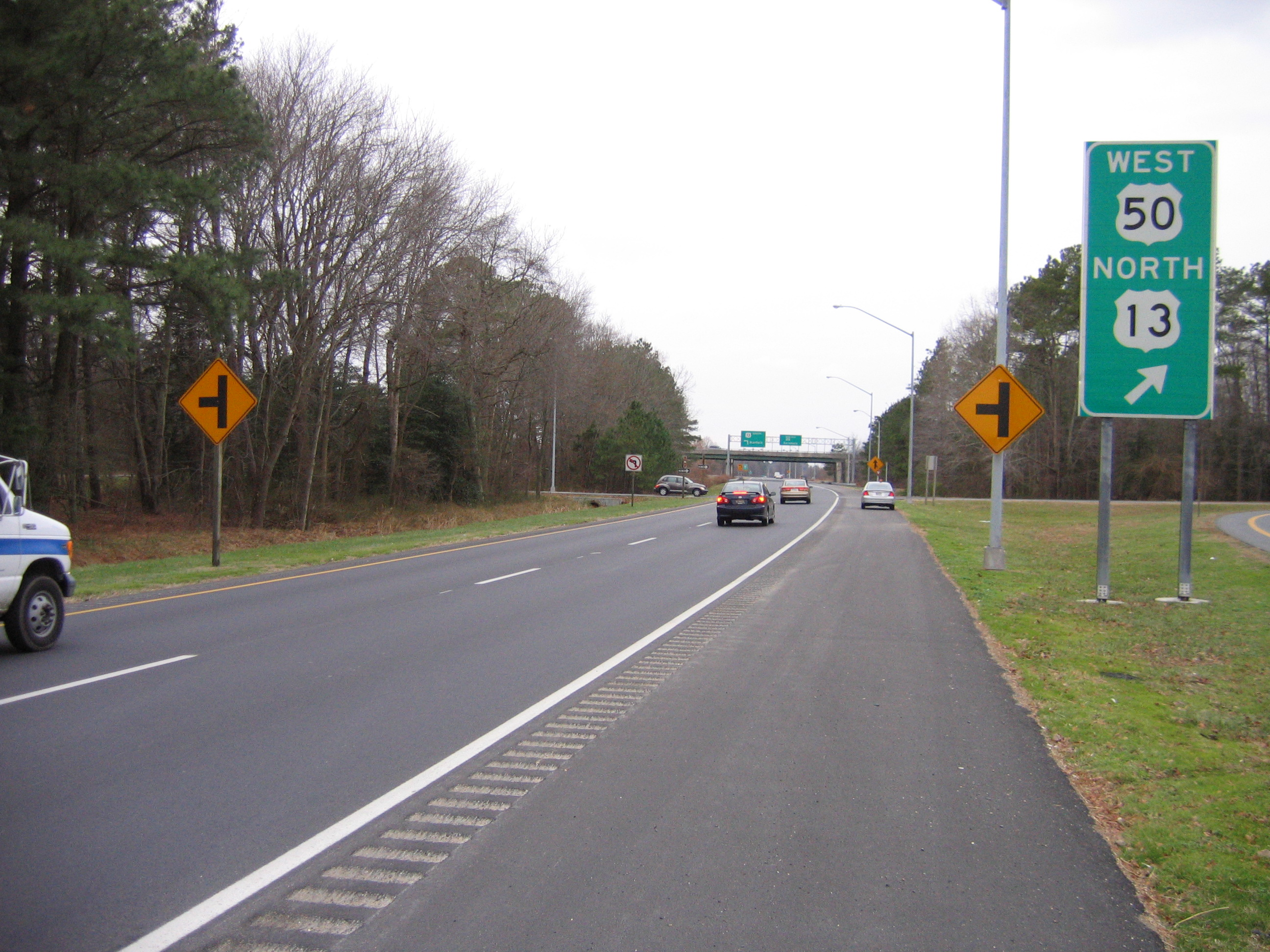
Westbound US 50 where it joins US 13 and Salisbury Bypass east of Salisbury

US 50 comes to an eastbound exit and westbound entrance with US 50 Bus., which heads southeast into Salisbury along Ocean Gateway. At this point, US 50 becomes a four-lane freeway called the Salisbury Bypass that bypasses Salisbury to the north and east. From here, the route continues east and reaches a diamond interchange with Naylor Mill Road (US 50UA). Following this interchange, the freeway heads through wooded areas with some nearby residential development, coming to a bridge over the Wicomico River. The road passes through the Northwood business park on an earthen viaduct, crossing over the Delmarva Central Railroad's Delmarva Subdivision line before coming to an eastbound exit and westbound entrance with Northwood Drive. Past this interchange, US 50 comes to an interchange with US 13 and the northern terminus of US 13 Bus. at Salisbury Boulevard in a business area to the southwest of The Centre at Salisbury shopping mall. At this point, US 13 becomes concurrent with US 50 on the Salisbury Bypass, and the two routes head east through a mix of farmland and woodland with some homes. The freeway curves to the south and passes over the Delmarva Central Railroad's Willards Industrial Track line and MD 346 without an interchange. The road comes to a partial cloverleaf interchange with the eastern terminus of US 50 Bus. at Salisbury Parkway, at which point US 50 splits from the Salisbury Bypass to continue east as Ocean Gateway and US 13 continues south along the Salisbury Bypass.

US 50 continues east along Ocean Gateway, a four-lane, at-grade divided highway with a wide median, and passes to the north of Arthur W. Perdue Stadium, the home ballpark of the Delmarva Shorebirds baseball team. The route intersects Hobbs Road and heads through commercial areas, with the John Deere Drive (MD 992A) frontage road parallel to the south. The road runs through woods and crosses Beaverdam Creek before heading near more commercial development, passing to the north of Wor–Wic Community College past the Walston Switch Road intersection. US 50 traverses forests before running through a mix of farmland and woodland, reaching an intersection with Parsonsburg Road, which leads north to Parsonsburg, and Eastside Road (MD 992B). The route continues east through more rural land and comes to a junction with the southern terminus of MD 353, which heads north into Pittsville. The road runs through farmland with some woods, with MD 346 parallel a distance to the north. US 50 reaches an intersection with MD 354, which heads north into Willards. From here, the route continues into wooded areas and crosses the Pocomoke River.

=== Worcester County ===
After passing over the Pocomoke River, US 50 enters Worcester County and runs through more wooded areas before coming to an intersection with MD 610, which heads north to Whaleyville. Following this, the road curves to the southeast and passes through a mix of farmland and woodland. The route comes to an eastbound exit and westbound entrance with the western terminus of MD 90, a two-lane expressway that provides access to the northern part of Ocean City. From here, US 50 continues through rural land and heads into open agricultural areas as it reaches a junction with MD 346. Past this junction, MD 346 runs closely parallel to the southwest of the route until the intersection with Caleb Road (MD 992F), where MD 346 curves to the south-southeast toward Berlin. US 50 runs through a mix of farmland and woodland as it passes to the north of Berlin. The road comes to an intersection with MD 818, which provides access to Berlin. A short distance later, US 50 comes to a grade crossing with the Maryland and Delaware Railroad's Snow Hill Line as it reaches a cloverleaf interchange with US 113, with the ramps from eastbound US 50 to southbound US 113 and from southbound US 113 to westbound US 50 also crossing the railroad tracks at-grade.

Following the US 113 interchange, US 50 runs through woods before it heads between farmland to the north and businesses to the south as it intersects the eastern terminus of MD 346. At this point, the median narrows and the road bends to the east-northeast. The route runs through more agricultural areas with some businesses and passes north of Stephen Decatur High School as it comes to a junction with the southern terminus of MD 452. US 50 runs through a mix of farms and woods with some commercial development, becoming closely parallel with MD 707 to the north before that route heads further to the north. The road curves to the east-southeast and MD 707 comes closely parallel again before it intersects the southern terminus of MD 589, which heads north to provide access to the Ocean Downs casino and harness racetrack and Ocean Pines, at Grays Corner. The route passes between a shopping center to the southwest and MD 707 and a golf course to the northeast, with MD 707 ending near the intersection with Riddle Lane (US 50WA). US 50 heads through a mix of woodland and businesses, curving to the east and then the east-northeast as another section of MD 707 is located a short distance to the north, with US 50WB and US 50WC heading north to connect to MD 707. The road runs through wooded areas of residential and commercial development before coming to a bridge over Herring Creek.

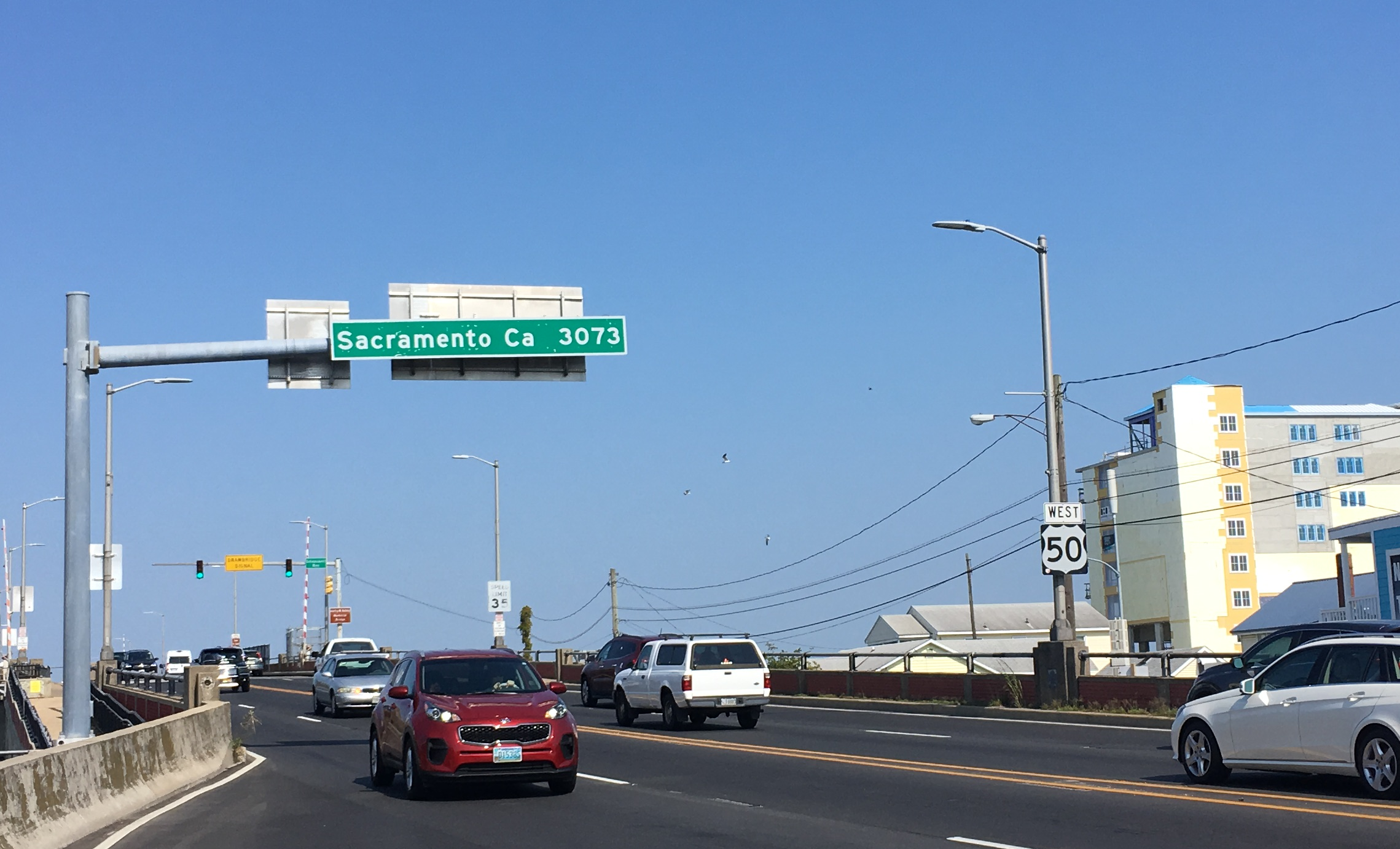
Westbound view of the beginning of US 50 in Ocean City, with an overhead sign giving the distance to the western terminus in Sacramento, California

Past the creek, the route intersects another section of MD 707 that heads southeast near the Greater Ocean City Chamber of Commerce visitor center. At this point, US 50 continues east into West Ocean City, lined with businesses. The road curves to the east-southeast and has a junction with the northern terminus of MD 611, which heads south to provide access to the Ocean City Municipal Airport and Assateague Island. Past this intersection, US 50 runs past more businesses, passing to the south of the Outlets Ocean City outlet mall and to the north of the West Ocean City Park and Ride. The route becomes a four-lane undivided road and crosses over the Sinepuxent Bay on the Harry W. Kelley Memorial Bridge, a drawbridge. After crossing the bay, US 50 continues into the downtown area of Ocean City and passes near residential areas before heading near businesses and coming to its eastern terminus. Here, the route intersects MD 528, which runs one-way southbound on Philadelphia Avenue, where the westbound lanes of US 50 begin. Eastbound US 50 continues east on North Division Street, which carries two lanes of one-way traffic. One block later, eastbound US 50 reaches its eastern terminus at MD 378, which runs one-way northbound on Baltimore Avenue, one block west of the Ocean City Boardwalk along the Atlantic Ocean.

Heading west on US 50 out of Ocean City, an overhead mileage sign lists the distance to the western terminus of the route in Sacramento, California, as 3,073 miles (4,946 km). The sign reflects the length of US 50 at the time the sign was posted in the early 1980s. Due to changes to the route since then, the length listed is no longer accurate, as US 50 is about 3,008 miles (4,841 km) long.

== History ==
The road was designated in 1926. On the Western Shore, US 50 was on the alignment currently known as MD 450. It ended at Church Circle in Annapolis, near St. Anne's Church. Beyond the end of US 50 was a ferry which connected the route to what was then MD 17 on the Eastern Shore, in Talbot County.

Just before the Chesapeake Bay Bridge's completion, in 1948, US 50 was extended east to Ocean City. This extension brought the route across the bay via an existing ferry service, and US 50 replaced much of US 213 and portions of MD 404 on the Eastern Shore. As a result of US 50 being routed onto the Eastern Shore, US 213 north of what is now US 50 was removed from the U.S. Highway system, and later the current MD 213. Once the original two-lane span of the bridge was completed in 1952, it replaced the ferry, which had been in service since the road opened. The John Hanson Highway, named for John Hanson, was the first section of US 50 to be upgraded to a freeway in Maryland. It was completed soon after the Bay Bridge was built, and the older alignment was redesignated MD 450. A slight extension of MD 450 was then built to reconnect it with US 50 near the present-day intersection with MD 2. The rest of the new alignment was completed by 1961, unlike it, they were grade separated.

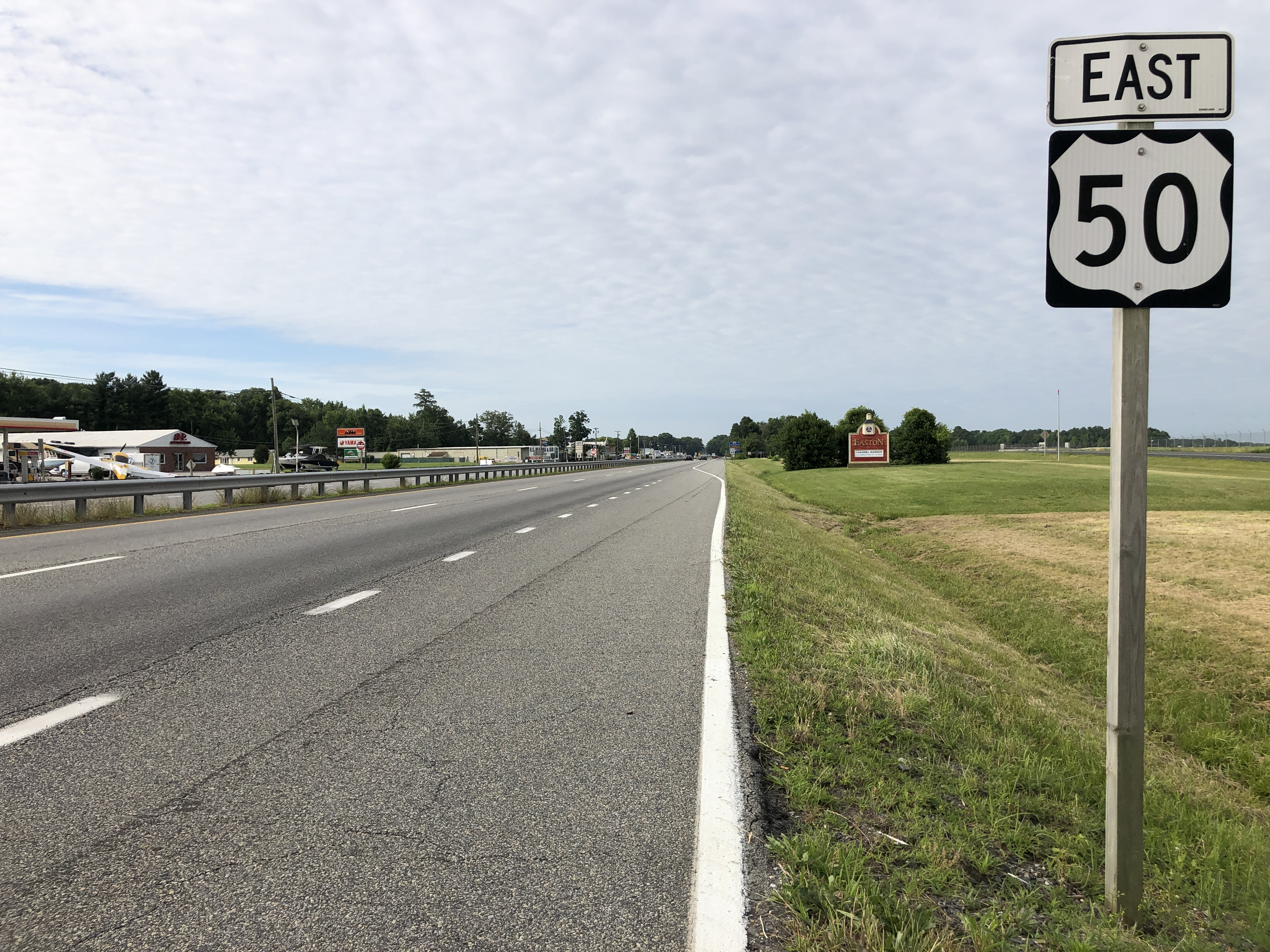
US 50 eastbound past MD 309 in Easton

High volumes of beach traffic as a result of the Chesapeake Bay Bridge made further upgrades to the route necessary. A very straight alignment south through Talbot County was built in 1965, the former alignment becoming MD 662. In Salisbury, US 50 was moved from Main Street to Church Street. In Worcester County, its present-day alignment was built, though only dualized east of US 113 in Berlin. Also, the four-lane section of US 50 was completed between Salisbury at then-US 13 and Berlin at US 113, its old alignment east of East Main Street becoming MD 346, and Church Street was returned to the city

Construction was undertaken to widen all of US 50 near the Eastern Shore with two carriageways. This was completed when the adjacent span of the Chesapeake Bay Bridge opened in 1973. This competed widening the thoroughfare to an asymmetrical five lanes.

In 1987, the Frederick Malkus Bridge was opened, replacing the obsolete Emerson C. Harrington Bridge.

By 1990, the US 50/US 301 portion of the Blue Star Memorial Highway had been upgraded to a freeway; prior to this, it was only a divided highway with several local roads intersecting it. After being upgraded, many of these intersections became sharp right-in/right-out ramps.

In 1992, just as the final two-lane section of US 50 was falling into severe disrepair, Vienna was bypassed to the northeast, completing the dualization of the eastern section of US 50. The drawbridge was then dismantled, and portions of the old road were designated MD 731. The designations have been rolled back over time, however, and MD 731 is no longer signed.

Interstate 595
- Location: New Carrollton – Annapolis
- Length: 19.97 mi (32.14 km)

Interstate 595 (I-595) is an unsigned number for a section of the John Hanson Highway (US 50 and US 301) from I-95/I-495 (Capital Beltway) east of Washington, D.C., east to MD 70 (Rowe Boulevard) at Annapolis, Maryland. The John Hanson Highway, US 50's route between Washington, D.C., and Annapolis, was constructed in 1957, and ran from New York Avenue just outside Washington, D.C., to MD 2, the Ritchie Highway, north of Annapolis, connecting to the western approach to the Chesapeake Bay Bridge. The highway was four lanes throughout, and connected to the Baltimore-Washington Parkway, I-495 and US 301 with full-cloverleaf interchanges. In the 1980s, the John Hanson Highway was planned to be designated as a part of I-97 between the Capital Beltway and the current I-97 interchange and as Interstate 197 between I-97 and MD 70. In the early 1980s, the I-595 route number was proposed for a connector in Baltimore from I-95 to what was then called I-170, which was left stranded from the rest of the Interstate Highway System by the cancellation of I-70 within the city limits of Baltimore. That connector was never built, and I-170 has been redesignated as part of US 40. Due to the increasing use of the highway and the dangerous conditions at the interchanges with the Capital Beltway and US 301, the highway was reconstructed to Interstate standards between 1990 and 1995 between the Capital Beltway and MD 70 in Annapolis. Funding for the project was released from the cancellation of Interstate Highway segments within Baltimore. Originally, planners intended to designate the reconstructed highway as I-68, but with the completion of the National Freeway in far western Maryland in 1991, the Maryland State Highway Administration chose instead to designate that route as I-68, leaving the John Hanson Highway to be designated as I-595. The route is unsigned.

In October 2002, the Salisbury Bypass was extended to circle the north side of the city. US 50 was rerouted onto this, and the alignment within the city became present-day US 50 Business.

From 2001 to November 2002, HOV lanes were built between exit 6 and exit 13.

New interchanges were built in 2007.

In May 2014, the bridge over the Nanticoke River was dedicated to soldiers who fought in both World War I and World War II.

The Pearl Harbor Memorial bridge was expanded to seven lanes, four eastbound and three westbound, from the fall 2017 to the spring of 2018. The expansion narrowed each of the lanes from 12 to 11 feet, and the shoulders from three feet to one foot. The renovation was completed after eight months of work and the improved layout was implemented in time for Memorial Day of 2018, helping to reduce congestion during peak eastbound travel times.

On June 27, 2023, the eastbound exit and entrance at exit 31 was permanently closed to improve safety at the intersection of Whitehall Road and Skidmore Drive.

On July 6, 2023, a pilot project was announced in which the eastbound entrances at exits 30 and 32 were closed during peak summer weekend travel periods from 10 a.m. Thursday to 6 p.m. Sunday between July 13, 2023, and September 5, 2023, in order to reduce traffic congestion along the parallel service road and encourage traffic to stay along US 50. Between September 16, 2023, and October 1, 2023, a pilot project took place in which the westbound entrances at MD 8, Duke Street, and Shopping Center Road on Kent Island were closed from 10 a.m. to 8 p.m. on Saturday and Sunday in order to keep through traffic approaching the Chesapeake Bay Bridge on US 50 and reduce traffic along MD 18. The westbound ramp closures on Kent Island will return in 2024 on weekends and Monday holidays from May 18 to September 2.

=== Future ===
In August 2010, the Maryland State Highway Administration announced plans to construct a new drawbridge over the Sinepuxent Bay to replace the current high rise structure. The new drawbridge was selected over a higher fixed span, which would have cost more and have displaced more properties. The bridge is not expected to be begin construction until at least 2035, with $300 million in funding for planning of the bridge. When the new bridge is complete, the existing structure is planned to be turned into a fishing pier with the central part of the bridge removed.

There are currently plans to upgrade US 50 in Queen Anne's County to a full limited access freeway, the freeway portion ending at an interchange with MD 404 atop the Queen Anne's/Talbot County border. This comes along with plans to fully dualize the latter highway in the state of Maryland.

In December 2004, plans were announced on a project to potentially replace the Chesapeake Bay Bridge with a new six lane span. The task force concluded that a bridge would be the best option for an additional crossing, and four geographic locations for such a bridge were explored: Anne Arundel County to Queen Anne's County (the existing location), Baltimore County to Kent County, Anne Arundel or Calvert County to Talbot County, and Calvert County to Dorchester County. In late 2006, the task force released a report on the study but did not make a final recommendation; members of the task force requested additional time to continue the study. In 2020, it was announced that 11 of 14 potential sites for a third span had been rejected by the Maryland Transportation Authority following a $5 million study into the impacts of an additional span. Significant environmental and economic impacts were identified, with a report stating that any additional crossing is "expected to be multiple billions of dollars."

== Major intersections ==
County	Location	mi	km	Exit	Destinations	Notes
Garrett		0.00	0.00		US 50 west (George Washington Highway) – Grafton	Western terminus of western segment of US 50 in Maryland; West Virginia state line
Garrett	Redhouse	2.08	3.35		US 219 (Garrett Highway) – Oakland, Deep Creek Lake, Thomas, WV	
Garrett	Gorman	9.10	14.65		MD 560 north (Gorman Road) – Loch Lynn Heights	Southern terminus of MD 560
Garrett	Gorman	9.17	14.76		US 50 east (George Washington Highway) – Romney	Eastern terminus of western segment of US 50 in Maryland; West Virginia state line at North Branch Potomac River
US 50 travels through West Virginia, Virginia, and Washington, D.C.
Prince George's	Cheverly	0.00	0.00		US 50 west (New York Avenue) – Washington	Western terminus of eastern segment of US 50 in Maryland; District of Columbia boundary
Prince George's	Cheverly	0.00	0.00	Western end of freeway section		
Prince George's	Cheverly	0.20	0.32		Baltimore–Washington Parkway (MD 295 north) – Baltimore	Eastbound exit and westbound entrance
Prince George's	Cheverly	0.50	0.80		MD 201 (Kenilworth Avenue) / MD 459 south to I-295 south – Bladensburg, Alexandria	MD 459 not signed
Prince George's	Cheverly	1.45	2.33		MD 459 north / Columbia Park Road – Cheverly	No westbound exit; MD 459 not signed
Prince George's	Cheverly	2.80	4.51	3	MD 202 (Landover Road) – Bladensburg, Upper Marlboro	Signed as exits 3A (north) and 3B (south) eastbound
Prince George's	Landover Hills	4.10	6.60	5	MD 410 (Veterans Parkway) / Ardwick Ardmore Road	
Prince George's	Landover Hills	4.52	7.27	6	Garden City Drive (MD 950) / Ardwick Ardmore Road (US 50PA) – New Carrollton Station	No eastbound exit
Prince George's	Lanham	5.04	8.11	7	I-95 / I-495 (Capital Beltway) – Baltimore, Silver Spring, Richmond	Western end of I-595 concurrency; I-95 / I-495 Exit 19; signed as exits 7A (south) and 7B (north); western terminus of unsigned I-595
Prince George's	Lanham	6.06	9.75	8	MD 704 (Martin Luther King Jr. Highway) – Glenarden	
Prince George's	Bowie	11.72	18.86	11	MD 197 (Collington Road) – Bowie	
Prince George's	Bowie	13.12	21.11	13	US 301 south / MD 3 north (Robert Crain Highway) / Belair Drive – Richmond, Crofton, Melford	Signed as exits 13A (US 301), 13B (MD 3) and 13C (Belair); west end of concurrency with US 301; southern terminus of MD 3
Anne Arundel		16.54	26.62	16	MD 424 (Davidsonville Road) – Davidsonville, Crofton	
Anne Arundel	Parole	21.32	34.31	21	I-97 north – Baltimore	Southern terminus of I-97
Anne Arundel	Parole	22.38	36.02	22	MD 665 east (Aris T. Allen Boulevard) / To Riva Road	Western terminus of MD 665
Anne Arundel	Parole	23.04	37.08	23	MD 450 (West Street) to MD 178 – Parole, Crownsville	
Anne Arundel	Parole	23.49	37.80	23A	MD 2 south (Solomons Island Road) / Jennifer Road – Parole, Prince Frederick	Western end of MD 2 concurrency; no exit eastbound
Anne Arundel	Parole	24.76	39.85	24	MD 70 south (Roscoe Rowe Boulevard) / Bestgate Road – Annapolis	Eastern end of I-595 concurrency; signed as exits 24A (MD 70) and 24B (Bestgate) westbound; eastern terminus of unsigned I-595
Anne Arundel	Severn River	25.48– 26.03	41.01– 41.89	Severn River Bridge / Pearl Harbor Memorial Bridge		
Anne Arundel	Arnold	26.67	42.92	27	MD 2 north / MD 450 south (Governor Ritchie Highway) – Severna Park, Naval Academy, Baltimore	Eastern end of MD 2 concurrency; signed as exits 27A (MD 450) and 27B (MD 2) westbound
Anne Arundel	Arnold	26.97	43.40		MD 648 north (Baltimore–Annapolis Boulevard)	Right-in/right-out interchange westbound; officially MD 648F
Anne Arundel	Arnold	27.62	44.45	28	Bay Dale Drive to Old Mill Bottom Road / Ferguson Road	
Anne Arundel	Cape St. Claire	29.15	46.91	29	MD 179 (St. Margarets Road/Cape St. Claire Road) / MD 908 / Busch's Frontage Road / East College Parkway	Signed as exits 29A (Busch's) and 29B (Cape St. Claire) eastbound; Busch's Frontage Road and East College Parkway are MD 908A and MD 908B, respectively.
Anne Arundel	Cape St. Claire	29.66	47.73	30	Whitehall Road (MD 908C)	Eastbound exit and entrance
Anne Arundel	Cape St. Claire	30.64	49.31	31	Whitehall Road (MD 908C)	Right-in/right-out interchange eastbound
Anne Arundel	Skidmore	31.44	50.60	32	Oceanic Drive (MD 908D) – Sandy Point State Park	Last eastbound exit before toll
Chesapeake Bay		32.10– 36.16	51.66– 58.19	Chesapeake Bay Bridge (eastbound toll; E-ZPass or pay-by-plate)		
Queen Anne's	Stevensville	37.22	59.90	37	MD 8 (Business Parkway) – Stevensville, Romancoke	
Queen Anne's	Stevensville	37.87	60.95	38A	Duke Street	Right-in/right-out interchange westbound
Queen Anne's	Stevensville	37.89	60.98	38A	Thompson Creek Road	Right-in/right-out interchange eastbound
Queen Anne's	Chester	38.86	62.54	38B	Services	Westbound exit and entrance; frontage road is US 50QC.
Queen Anne's	Chester	38.98	62.73	39A	Cox Neck Road	Right-in/right-out interchange eastbound
Queen Anne's	Chester	38.99	62.75	39A	Castle Marina Road (MD 18Hto2=to) / MD 18	Right-in/right-out interchange westbound
Queen Anne's	Chester	39.49	63.55	39B	Piney Creek Road (MD 18T)	Right-in/right-out interchange westbound; connector road is MD 552A (Chester Station Road).
Queen Anne's	Chester	39.51	63.59	39B	MD 552 south (Dominion Road)	Right-in/right-out interchange eastbound; northern terminus of MD 552
Queen Anne's	Chester	40.14	64.60	40A	South Piney Road	Right-in/right-out interchange eastbound
Queen Anne's	Chester	40.17	64.65	40A	Piney Creek Road	Right-in/right-out interchange westbound
Queen Anne's	Chester	40.52	65.21	40B	Dundee Avenue	Right-in/right-out interchange eastbound
Queen Anne's	Kent Narrows	40.76	65.60	41	MD 18 (Main Street) – Kent Narrows West	Westbound ramps are with Piney Narrows Road.
Queen Anne's	Kent Narrows	41.04– 41.62	66.05– 66.98	Kent Narrows Bridge		
Queen Anne's	Kent Narrows	41.92	67.46	42	MD 18 (Main Street) – Kent Narrows East	Westbound right-in/right-out interchange with MD 835G (Kent Narrows Road); eastbound right-in/right-out interchange with MD 835 (Seward Marina Road)
Queen Anne's	Grasonville	42.80	68.88	43A	Jackson Creek Road (MD 18U)	Westbound right-in/right-out interchange
Queen Anne's	Grasonville	42.82	68.91	43A	MD 18 (Main Street) – Grasonville	Eastbound right-in/right-out interchange with unnamed MD 18F
Queen Anne's	Grasonville	43.37	69.80	43B	Chester River Beach Road (MD 18V)	No westbound exit
Queen Anne's	Grasonville	43.77	70.44	44A	VFW Avenue (MD 18W)	Westbound right-in/right-out interchange
Queen Anne's	Grasonville	43.78	70.46	44A	Station Lane (MD 18)	Eastbound right-in/right-out interchange
Queen Anne's	Grasonville	44.13	71.02	44B	Winchester Creek Road (MD 835H)	Westbound right-in/right-out interchange
Queen Anne's	Grasonville	44.14	71.04	44B	Evans Avenue (MD 18Z)	Eastbound right-in/right-out interchange
Queen Anne's	Grasonville	44.47	71.57	45A	Hissey Road (MD 835I)	Westbound right-in/right-out interchange
Queen Anne's	Grasonville	44.48	71.58	45A	Hess Road (MD 18X)	Eastbound right-in/right-out interchange
Queen Anne's	Grasonville	44.90	72.26	45B	Nesbit Road (MD 835K)	
Queen Anne's	Queenstown	46.09	74.17	46	US 301 north (Blue Star Memorial Highway) – Wilmington	Eastbound exit and westbound entrance; eastern end US 301 concurrency
Queen Anne's	Queenstown	46.09	74.17	Eastern end of freeway section		
Queen Anne's	Queenstown	46.37	74.63		MD 18 (Main Street) – Queenstown, Grasonville	Right-in/right-out intersections with MD 18B eastbound and MD 18S westbound, plus a turn from westbound US 50 to MD 18B; no direct access between MD 18B and MD 18S
Queen Anne's	Queenstown	47.72	76.80		MD 456 north (Del Rhodes Avenue) – Queenstown	Southern terminus of MD 456
Queen Anne's	Wye Mills	50.70	81.59		MD 662 south (Wye Mills Road) – Wye Mills	Northern terminus of MD 662
Queen Anne's	Wye Mills	51.57	82.99		MD 213 (Centreville Road) to US 301 north – Chesapeake College, Wye Oak State Park, Centreville, Wilmington	
Queen Anne's–Talbot county line	Wye Mills	53.05	85.38		MD 404 (Queen Annes Highway) – Denton, Rehoboth Beach, Wye Oak State Park, Wye Mills	
Talbot		55.36	89.09		MD 662 north (Old Wye Mills Road)	Southern terminus of MD 662
Talbot		55.82	89.83		MD 662 south (Old Skipton Road)	Northern terminus of MD 662; officially MD 662B
Talbot		57.68	92.83		MD 662 (Old Skipton Road/Longwoods Road)	Old Skipton Road is MD 662B; Longwoods Road is MD 662C.
Talbot	Easton	61.57	99.09		MD 662	Connector is unnamed MD 662D
Talbot	Easton	61.77	99.41		MD 309 north (Black Dog Alley) / Airport Road west – Cordova, Queen Anne	Southern terminus of MD 309
Talbot	Easton	62.71	100.92		MD 322 south (Easton Parkway) – St. Michaels, Tilghman Island, Oxford	Northern terminus of MD 322
Talbot	Easton	64.20	103.32		MD 328 east (Matthewstown Road) / Goldsborough Street west – Denton	Western terminus of MD 328
Talbot	Easton	64.54	103.87		MD 331 south (Dover Road) / Dover Road west – Preston	Northern terminus of MD 331
Talbot	Easton	66.87	107.62		MD 322 north (Easton Parkway) to MD 33 – St. Michaels, Oxford	Southern terminus of MD 322; no access from southbound MD 322 to westbound US 50
Talbot		67.70	108.95		MD 565 south (Easton Trappe Road) – Trappe	Northern terminus of MD 565
Talbot	Trappe	72.97	117.43		Barber Road east / Main Street north to MD 565	
Choptank River		77.47– 79.11	124.68– 127.32	Frederick C. Malkus Memorial Bridge		
Dorchester	Cambridge	80.05	128.83		MD 343 west (Washington Street)	Eastern terminus of MD 343; no direct access from eastbound MD 343 to westbound US 50
Dorchester	Cambridge	80.79	130.02		MD 16 west (Church Creek Road) – Church Creek, Taylors Island, Hoopers Island	Western end of MD 16 concurrency
Dorchester	Cambridge	81.20	130.68		MD 750 east (Old Route 50)	Western terminus of MD 750
Dorchester	Cambridge	82.00	131.97		MD 750 west (Old Route 50)	Eastern terminus of MD 750
Dorchester		83.45	134.30		MD 16 east (Mount Holly Road) – East New Market, Secretary, Hurlock	Eastern end of MD 16 concurrency; no direct access from westbound MD 16 to eastbound US 50
Dorchester	Vienna	93.47	150.43		Old Ocean Gateway – Vienna	Eastbound exit and entrance
Dorchester	Vienna	94.58	152.21		MD 331 (Rhodesdale Vienna Road) – Vienna	Partial cloverleaf interchange; southern terminus of MD 331
Nanticoke River		95.14– 96.14	153.11– 154.72	Nanticoke River Memorial Bridge		
Wicomico	Mardela Springs	99.93	160.82		MD 313 north (Delmar Road) to MD 54 east – Sharptown, Delmar	Southern terminus of MD 313
Wicomico	Hebron	104.80	168.66		MD 347 south (Quantico Road) – Hebron, Quantico	Northern terminus of MD 347
Wicomico	Hebron	105.96	170.53		MD 670 west (Lillian Street) – Hebron, Quantico	Eastern terminus of MD 670; no direct access from eastbound MD 670 to westbound US 50
Wicomico		107.88	173.62	Western end of freeway section		
Wicomico		107.88	173.62		US 50 Bus. east (Ocean Gateway) – Salisbury	Eastbound exit and westbound entrance; western terminus of US 50 Bus.
Wicomico		108.59	174.76		Naylor Mill Road (US 50UA)	Diamond interchange
Wicomico	Salisbury	110.86	178.41		Northwood Drive	Eastbound exit and westbound entrance
Wicomico	Salisbury	111.38	179.25		US 13 north / US 13 Bus. south (Salisbury Boulevard) – Salisbury, Dover	Partial cloverleaf interchange with flyover; no access from northbound US 13 Bus. to westbound US 50; western end of US 13 concurrency; northern terminus of US 13 Bus.
Wicomico	Salisbury	114.46	184.21		US 13 south (Salisbury Bypass) – Norfolk US 50 Bus. west (Salisbury Parkway) – Salisbury	Partial cloverleaf interchange; eastern end of US 13 concurrency; eastern terminus of US 50 Bus.
Wicomico	Salisbury	114.46	184.21	Eastern end of freeway section		
Wicomico	Pittsville	120.83	194.46		MD 353 north (Sixty Foot Road) – Pittsville	Southern terminus of MD 353
Wicomico	Willards	124.61	200.54		MD 354 (Powellville Road) – Willards, Powellville	
Worcester	Whaleyville	126.94	204.29		MD 610 (Whaleyville Road) – Whaleyville, Selbyville	
Worcester		129.06	207.70		MD 90 east (Ocean City Expressway) – Ocean City and Points North	Eastbound exit and westbound entrance; western terminus of MD 90
Worcester	Berlin	131.06	210.92		MD 346 (Old Ocean City Boulevard)	
Worcester	Berlin	132.81	213.74		MD 818 (Main Street) – Berlin Town Center	
Worcester	Berlin	133.14	214.27		US 113 (Worcester Highway) – Snow Hill, Dover	Cloverleaf interchange
Worcester	Berlin	133.97	215.60		MD 346 west (Old Ocean City Boulevard) – Berlin	Eastern terminus of MD 346
Worcester	Berlin	134.48	216.42		MD 452 north (Friendship Road)	Southern terminus of MD 452
Worcester		135.74	218.45		MD 589 north (Racetrack Road) – Casino Ocean Downs, Ocean Pines	Southern terminus of MD 589
Worcester	West Ocean City	138.21	222.43		MD 707 east (Old Bridge Road)	Western terminus of MD 707; officially MD 707A
Worcester	West Ocean City	139.03	223.75		MD 611 south (Stephen Decatur Highway) – Ocean City Airport, Assateague Island Parks	Northern terminus of MD 611
Worcester	Sinepuxent Bay	139.89– 140.38	225.13– 225.92	Harry W. Kelley Memorial Bridge		
Worcester	Ocean City	140.43	226.00		MD 528 south (Philadelphia Avenue) – Inlet Area	Eastern terminus of westbound US 50
Worcester	Ocean City	140.50	226.11		MD 378 north (Baltimore Avenue) / North Division Street east – Points North	Eastern terminus of eastbound US 50
1.000 mi = 1.609 km; 1.000 km = 0.621 mi: Closed/former; Concurrency terminus; Electronic toll collection; Incomplete access

== Related routes ==
=== Salisbury business route ===
U.S. Route 50 Business
- Location: Salisbury, Maryland
- Length: 6.88 mi (11.07 km)
- Existed: 2002–present
- Tourist routes: Chesapeake Country Scenic Byway

U.S. Route 50 Business (US 50 Bus.) is a business route of US 50 which runs 6.88 miles (11.07 km) from US 50 on the northwest side of Salisbury to US 13 and US 50 on the east side of Salisbury in central Wicomico County. US 50 Bus. is a four- to six-lane divided highway within and on either side of the central business district of Salisbury, where the highway intersects MD 349, US 13 Bus., and MD 346. US 50 Bus. west of MD 349 is a mid-1950s upgrade of the original highway entering Salisbury from the northwest. The business route between MD 349 and MD 346 was a relocation of US 50 from Main Street built in the early 1960s. East of MD 346, US 50 Bus. is part of the relocation of US 50 between Salisbury and Berlin completed in the mid-1960s. US 50 Bus. was designated when the US 50 portion of the Salisbury Bypass was completed in 2002.

=== Auxiliary routes ===
- US 50PA is the designation for the 0.21 mi (0.34 km) section of one-way southbound Ardwick Ardmore Road from Garden City Drive south to Pennsy Drive in New Carrollton, Prince George's County, where Ardwick Ardmore Road continues southeast as a county road. The route provides access from Garden City Drive and the New Carrollton station to ramps leading to westbound and eastbound US 50.
- US 50QB is the designation for a 0.10 mi (0.16 km) ramp from westbound US 50 to MD 456 near Queenstown, Queen Anne's County.
- US 50QC is the designation for a 0.55 mi (0.89 km) unnamed one-way frontage road running parallel to westbound US 50/southbound US 301 from exit 38B of US 50/US 301 to an entrance to US 50/US 301 in Chester, Queen Anne's County, providing access to businesses.
- US 50UA is the designation for the 0.36 mi (0.58 km) section of two-lane undivided Naylor Mill Road between Milford Twilley Drive and West Road in Salisbury, Wicomico County, intersecting US 50 at a diamond interchange.
- US 50WA is the designation for the 0.02 mi (0.032 km) section of two-lane divided Riddle Lane from US 50 north to the end of state maintenance in Grays Corner, Worcester County, where Riddle Lane continues north to provide access to MD 707.
- US 50WB is the designation for a 0.05 mi (0.080 km) two-lane undivided connector from US 50 north to MD 707 in Grays Corner, Worcester County.
- US 50WC is the designation for a 0.02 mi (0.032 km) two-lane undivided connector from US 50 north to MD 707 in Grays Corner, Worcester County.

== See also ==
U.S. Route 50
Previous state: West Virginia	Maryland	Next state: West Virginia
Previous state: District of Columbia	Maryland	Next state: Terminus
