= Maryland Route 908 =

State highway in Maryland, United States

Maryland Route 908

Route information
- Maintained by MDSHA and MDTA
- Existed: 1954–present

Location
- Country: United States
- State: Maryland
- Counties: Anne Arundel

Highway system
- Maryland highway system; Interstate; US; State; Scenic Byways
← MD 904	→ MD 909

Maryland Route 908 (MD 908) is a collection of unsigned state highways in Anne Arundel County in the U.S. state of Maryland. These five highways are service roads that parallel and provide access to U.S. Route 50 (US 50) and US 301 along their western approach to the Chesapeake Bay Bridge; the highways also provide access to Sandy Point State Park. The first modern highway from Cape St. Claire to Skidmore was constructed in the late 1920s and replaced by the modern alignment of US 50 in the late 1940s. The frontage roads on either side of the U.S. Highway were constructed in the early 1950s. The mainline segments of MD 908 assumed their present form when US 50 and US 301 were upgraded to a freeway in the early 1990s.

== Route description ==
There are three mainline segments of MD 908 and two additional segments of the highway at Skidmore.

- MD 908A runs 0.55 miles (0.89 km) from US 50 and US 301 east along the eastbound side of the U.S. Highways to MD 179 near Cape St. Claire.
- MD 908B has a length of 2.09 miles (3.36 km) from MD 931R near Cape St. Claire east along the westbound side of US 50 and US 301 to MD 908D in Skidmore.
- MD 908C extends 2.52 miles (4.06 km) from MD 179 near Cape St. Claire east along the eastbound side of the U.S. Highways to the end of state maintenance just east of MD 908D in Skidmore.

=== Eastbound frontage ===
MD 908A begins at the state highway begins as the Exit 29A ramp from eastbound US 50 and US 301 (Blue Star Memorial Highway). The highway heads east as Buschs Frontage Road, which gains a westbound lane and closely parallels the eastbound direction of US 50-301. After passing an on-ramp to the freeway, the state highway veers around a loop ramp from MD 179's interchange with the U.S. Highways and reaches its eastern terminus at MD 179 (St. Margarets Road). The roadway continues on the east side of the intersection as MD 908C. That highway heads east as Whitehall Road, which passes around another loop of the interchange and briefly parallels the freeway before temporarily moving away for an interchange with the eastbound direction of the freeway. MD 908C returns to paralleling the freeway and reaches the county-maintained north–south segment of Whitehall Road. The north leg of the intersection is a right-in/right-out interchange with eastbound US 50 and US 301. MD 908C continues east as Skidmore Drive, which veers around the U.S. Highways' interchange with MD 908D (Oceanic Drive), intersecting Holly Beach Farm Road, which is MD 931Y. The state highway meets the southern end of MD 908D (Oceanic Drive), just east of which the highway reaches its eastern terminus. The roadway continues east as Old Ferry Slip Road.

=== Westbound frontage ===
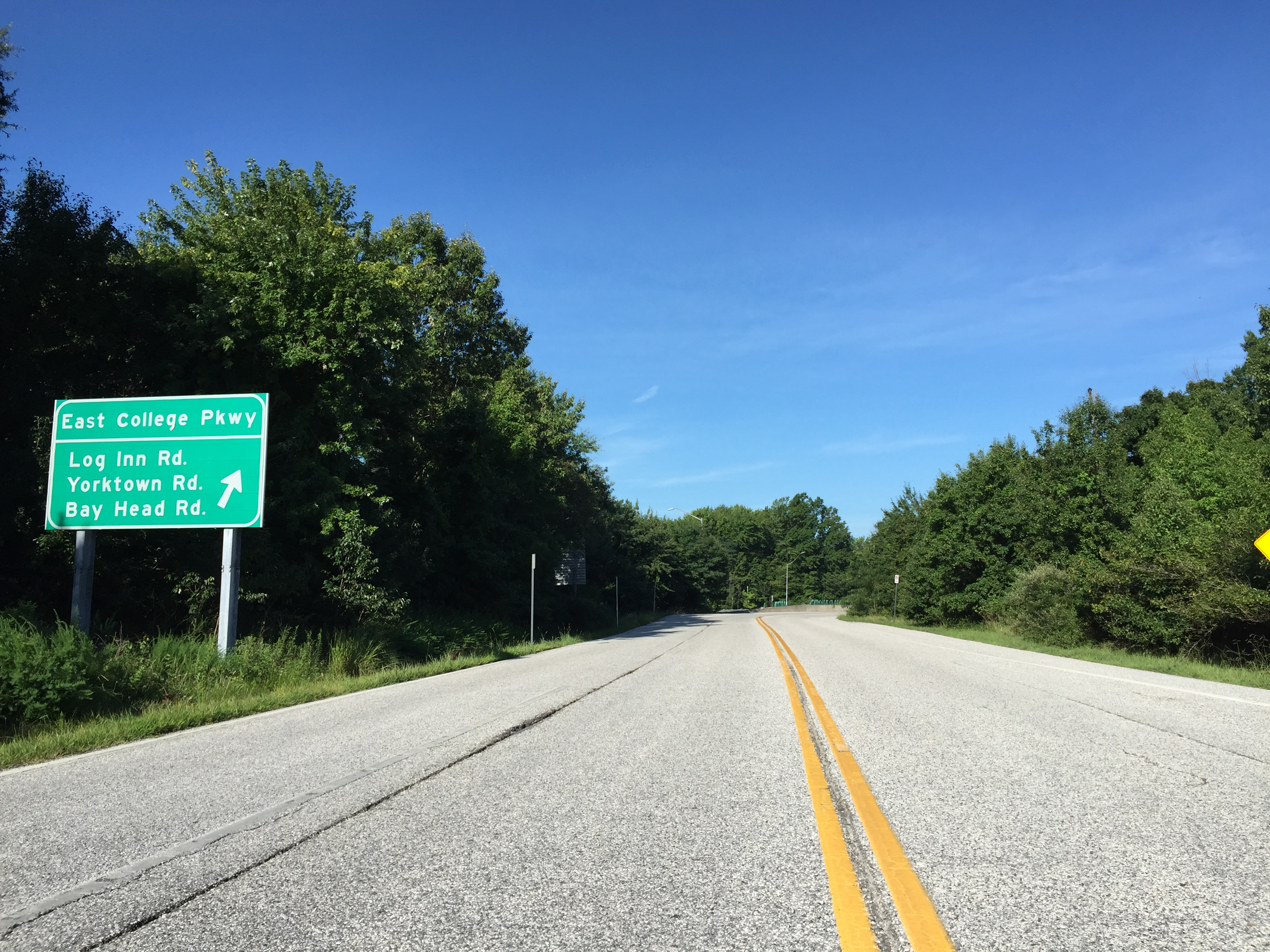
View east along MD 908B in Skidmore

MD 908B begins in Cape St. Claire where East College Parkway makes a 90-degree turn east to closely parallel the westbound lanes of US 50 and US 301; the north–south segment of East College Parkway is unsigned MD 931R. MD 908B closely parallels the freeway until the highway approaches MD 908D (Oceanic Drive). After passing a ramp to westbound US 50 and US 301, MD 908B reaches its eastern terminus at the northern end of MD 908D (Oceanic Drive). The roadway continues east as South Beach Road, the entrance to Sandy Point State Park.

=== Skidmore ===
- MD 908D is the designation for Oceanic Drive, a 0.41-mile (0.66 km) service road that connects MD 908C and MD 908B in Skidmore and crosses over and has a partial cloverleaf interchange with US 50 and US 301. This interchange is the closest interchange to the western end of the Chesapeake Bay Bridge and its toll plaza. The four-way intersection at MD 908D's northern terminus includes the county-maintained continuation of Oceanic Drive and the access road to Sandy Point State Park.
- MD 908E is the designation for Admin Service Road, a 0.24-mile (0.39 km) one-lane road that connects the ramp from MD 908D to westbound US 50 and US 301 to the Chesapeake Bay Bridge administration building. The highway is maintained by the Maryland Transportation Authority.

== History ==
The corridor today used by US 50, US 301, and MD 908 was originally constructed as an eastward extension of MD 179 from St. Margarets to Skidmore in 1928. Between 1942 and 1944, a ferry terminal was constructed at Sandy Point as the new western end of the Annapolis–Matapeake ferry. A 6-mile (9.7 km) highway was constructed from MD 2 east to the new terminal along the alignment of the modern US 50 freeway. This highway, which was designated a westward extension of MD 404 by 1946, replaced the portion of MD 179 east of what is now MD 908B's western terminus. MD 404 was expanded to a four-lane divided highway in 1948 and 1949. US 50 replaced MD 404 when the U.S. Highway was extended east from Annapolis to Ocean City in 1949 in anticipation of the Chesapeake Bay Bridge, which opened in 1952.

Between 1952 and 1954, 3.3 miles (5.3 km) of service roads were constructed parallel to US 50. These service roads included MD 908A from its western terminus to where the highway veers away from US 50 and US 301 at the west end of the MD 179 interchange; MD 908C from where that highway veers away from the U.S. Highways at the east end of the MD 179 interchange to Holly Beach Farm Road; MD 908B between Log Inn Road and Bay Head Road; and MD 908B from the right-angle turn at MD 931R east to Stacey Lane. It is not clear when these frontage roads received the MD 908 designation. MD 908D was constructed when the U.S. Highways' interchange with Oceanic Drive was built in 1974. The gap in MD 908B was filled by 1978. US 50 and US 301 were reconstructed as a freeway from MD 2 to the Chesapeake Bay Bridge in 1991, including a new interchange with MD 179. The four segments of MD 908 assumed their present courses as part of that project. MD 908E was assigned near the Chesapeake Bay Bridge toll plaza in 2009.

== Junction lists ==
All sections of MD 908 are entirely within Anne Arundel County.

=== MD 908A and MD 908C ===
Location	mi	km	Destinations	Notes
Cape St. Claire	0.00	0.00	Road begins	Western terminus of MD 908A; single ramp from eastbound US 50 / US 301
Cape St. Claire	0.39	0.63	US 50 / US 301 east – Bay Bridge	Single ramp
Cape St. Claire	0.55 0.00	0.89 0.00	MD 179 (St. Margarets Road) to US 50 / US 301 west – Washington	Eastern terminus of MD 908A; western terminus of MD 908C
Cape St. Claire	0.67	1.08	US 50 / US 301 east – Bay Bridge	Partial interchange with eastbound US 50 / US 301
Skidmore	2.41	3.88	Holly Beach Farm Road	Unsigned MD 931Y
Skidmore	2.50	4.02	Oceanic Drive north – Sandy Point State Park	Unsigned MD 908D
Skidmore	2.52	4.06	Old Ferry Slip Road east	Eastern terminus of MD 908C
1.000 mi = 1.609 km; 1.000 km = 0.621 mi: Incomplete access

=== MD 908B ===
Location	mi	km	Destinations	Notes
Cape St. Claire	0.00	0.00	East College Parkway north	Western terminus of MD 908B; East College Parkway is unsigned MD 931R
Skidmore	1.92	3.09	US 50 / US 301 west – Washington	Single ramp
Skidmore	2.09	3.36	Oceanic Drive / South Beach Road east – Sandy Point State Park	Eastern terminus of MD 908B; southbound Oceanic Drive is unsigned MD 908D
1.000 mi = 1.609 km; 1.000 km = 0.621 mi: Incomplete access
