= Kent Narrows =

Coordinates: 38°58′19″N 76°14′50″W

The Kent Narrows, also known as Kent Island Narrows and to local residents simply as the Narrows, is a waterway that connects the Chester River with the Eastern Bay and also separates Kent Island from the Delmarva Peninsula. It runs through the community of Kent Narrows, Maryland. The Kent Narrows was originally shallow and surrounded by marsh. A causeway was built across it in 1826, but was removed in 1876 when the channel was dredged. Today the Kent Narrows continues to be dredged regularly. The area has traditionally been a location for seafood packing and restaurants.

== Bridges ==
Several bridges, both part of roads and the Queen Anne's Railroad, have crossed the Kent Narrows in the past. Currently, two road bridges cross the Kent Narrows.

- The R. Clayton Mitchell Jr. Bridge, formerly known as the Kent Narrows Bridge, is part of US 50/US 301 and was built during the early 1990s as part of upgrades to US 50/US 301 on the Eastern Shore of Maryland.
- The Waterman's Memorial Bridge, a drawbridge formerly known as the Old Kent Narrows Bridge, is part of Maryland Route 18 as well as the American Discovery Trail and serves local traffic, both automobiles and pedestrians. It once carried US 50 as the main bridge across the Kent Narrows until the newer bridge was built.

== Gallery ==
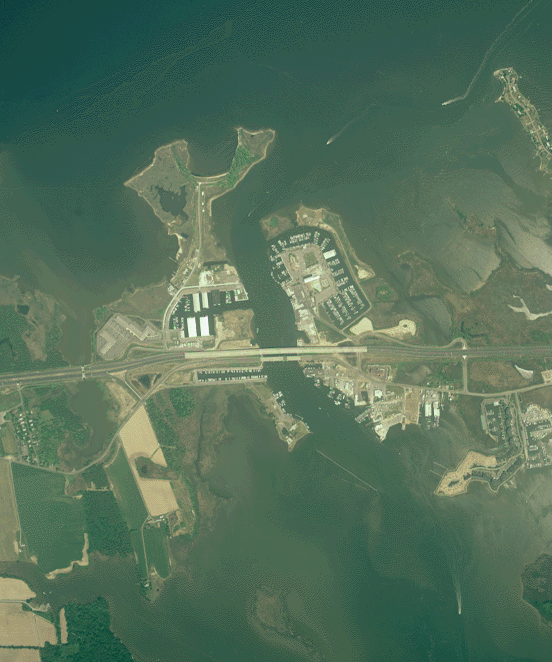
Aerial view of the Kent Narrows

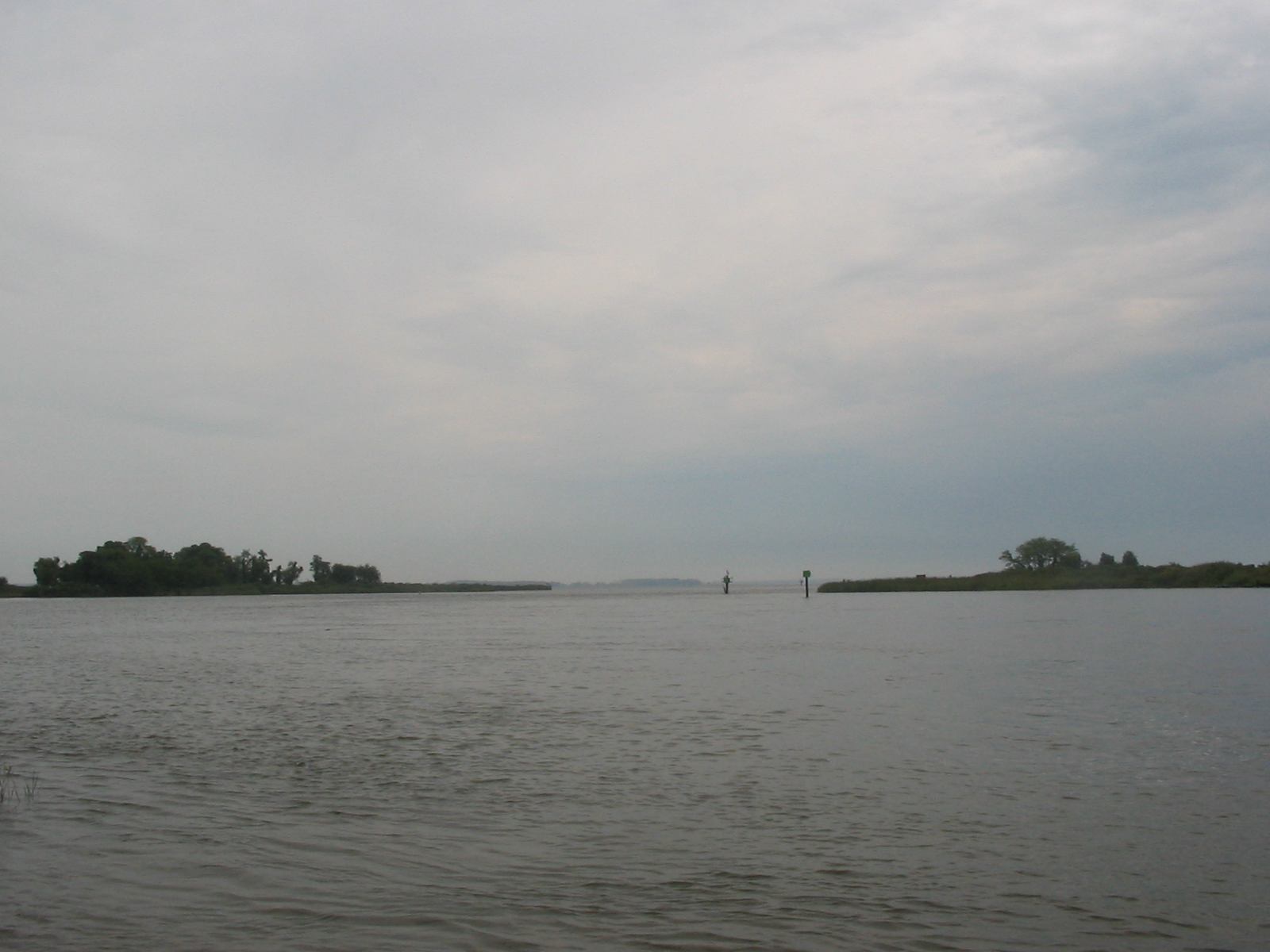
Kent Narrows as seen from Kent Island

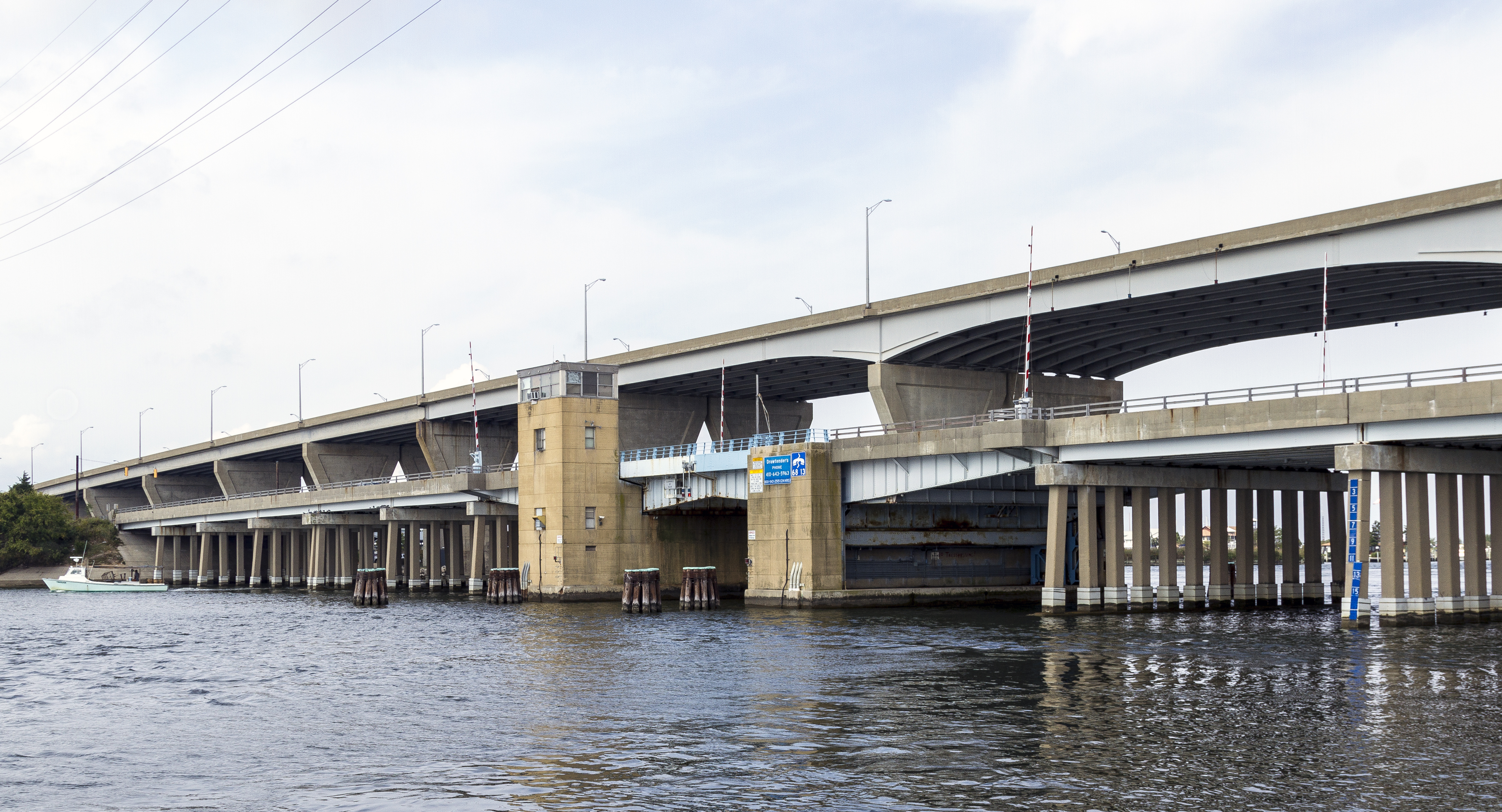
The R. Clayton Mitchell Jr. Bridge (rear) and the Waterman's Memorial Bridge (front) at Kent Narrows
