= Frederick C. Malkus Bridge =

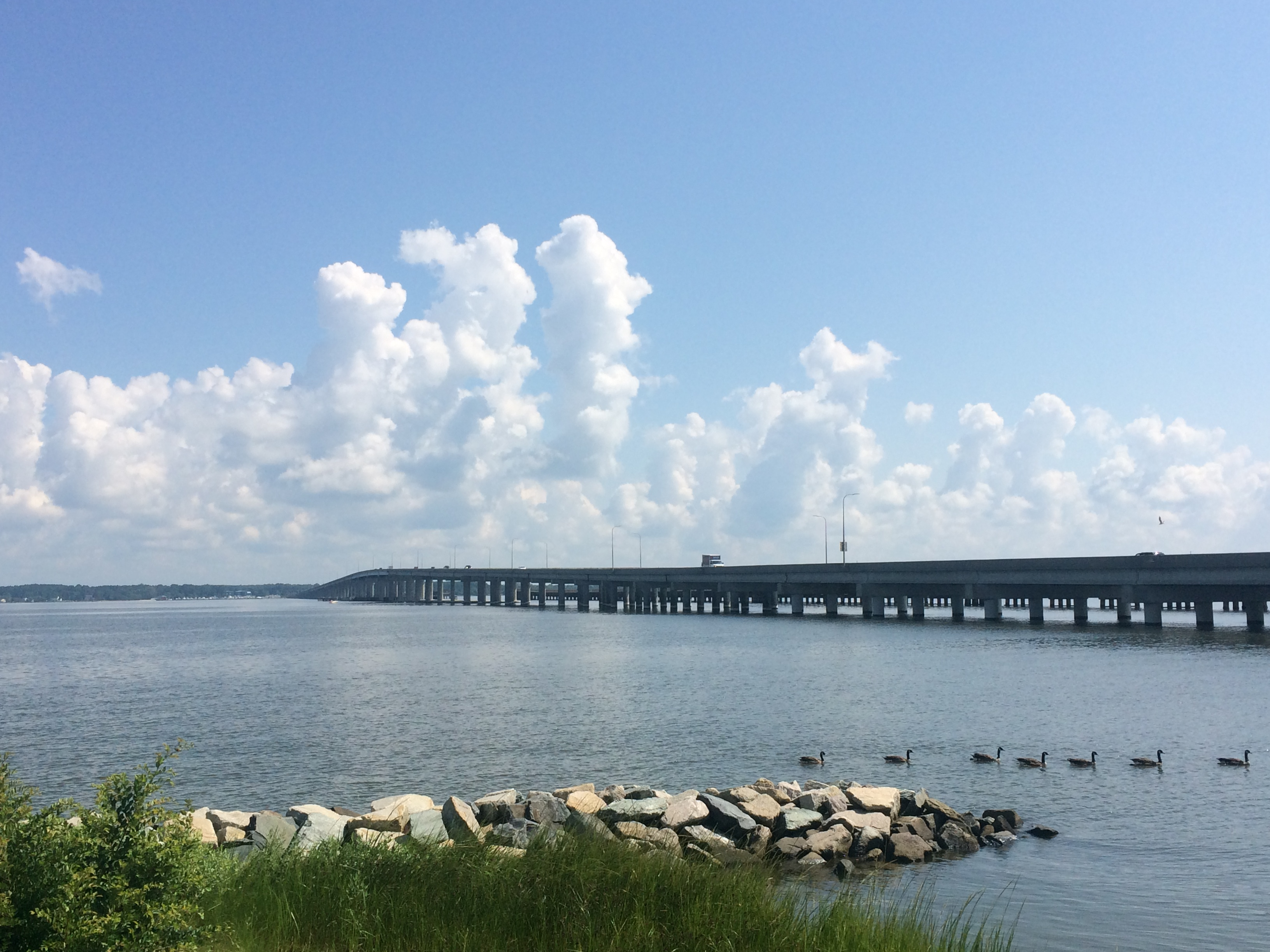
- Fredrick C. Malkus Bridge in August 2020
- Coordinates: 38°34′50″N 76°03′20″W
- Carries: Four lanes of US 50
- Crosses: Choptank River
- Locale: Cambridge, Maryland
- Maintained by: Maryland State Highway Administration

Characteristics
- No. of lanes: 4

Location
- Interactive map of Frederick C. Malkus Bridge

The Frederick C. Malkus Bridge, also known as the Choptank River Bridge, is a four-lane none-span beam bridge across the Choptank River in Maryland. Built in 1987 to replace the aging Emerson C. Harrington Bridge, the new bridge was named after Maryland state senator Frederick Malkus. U.S. Route 50 (US 50) crosses the river over the bridge between the towns of Cambridge and Trappe. The bridge is made of pre-stressed and pre-cast concrete.
