= Maryland Route 665 =

Highway in Maryland

Maryland Route 665
- Aris T. Allen Boulevard
- Maryland Route 665 highlighted in red

Route information
- Maintained by MDSHA
- Length: 2.68 mi (4.31 km)
- Existed: 1991–present

Major junctions
- West end: US 50 / US 301 in Parole
- MD 2 in Parole
- East end: Bywater Road in Annapolis

Location
- Country: United States
- State: Maryland
- Counties: Anne Arundel

Highway system
- Maryland highway system; Interstate; US; State; Scenic Byways
← MD 662	→ MD 667

Maryland Route 665 (MD 665) is a state highway in the U.S. state of Maryland. Known as Aris T. Allen Boulevard, the state highway runs 2.68 miles (4.31 km) from U.S. Route 50 (US 50)/US 301 in Parole east to Bywater Road and Forest Drive in Annapolis. MD 665 is a four-lane divided highway that connects US 50/US 301 and Interstate 97 (I-97) with MD 2 and the southern part of Annapolis and adjacent unincorporated communities on the Annapolis Neck in central Anne Arundel County. MD 665 was assigned to Forest Drive from MD 2 east to Bay Ridge Avenue circa 1950. The highway was relocated at its intersections with MD 387 and Bay Ridge Road in the 1960s. The Forest Drive iteration of MD 665 was removed from the state highway system in the late 1980s immediately before construction began on modern MD 665, which opened in 1992.

== Route description ==
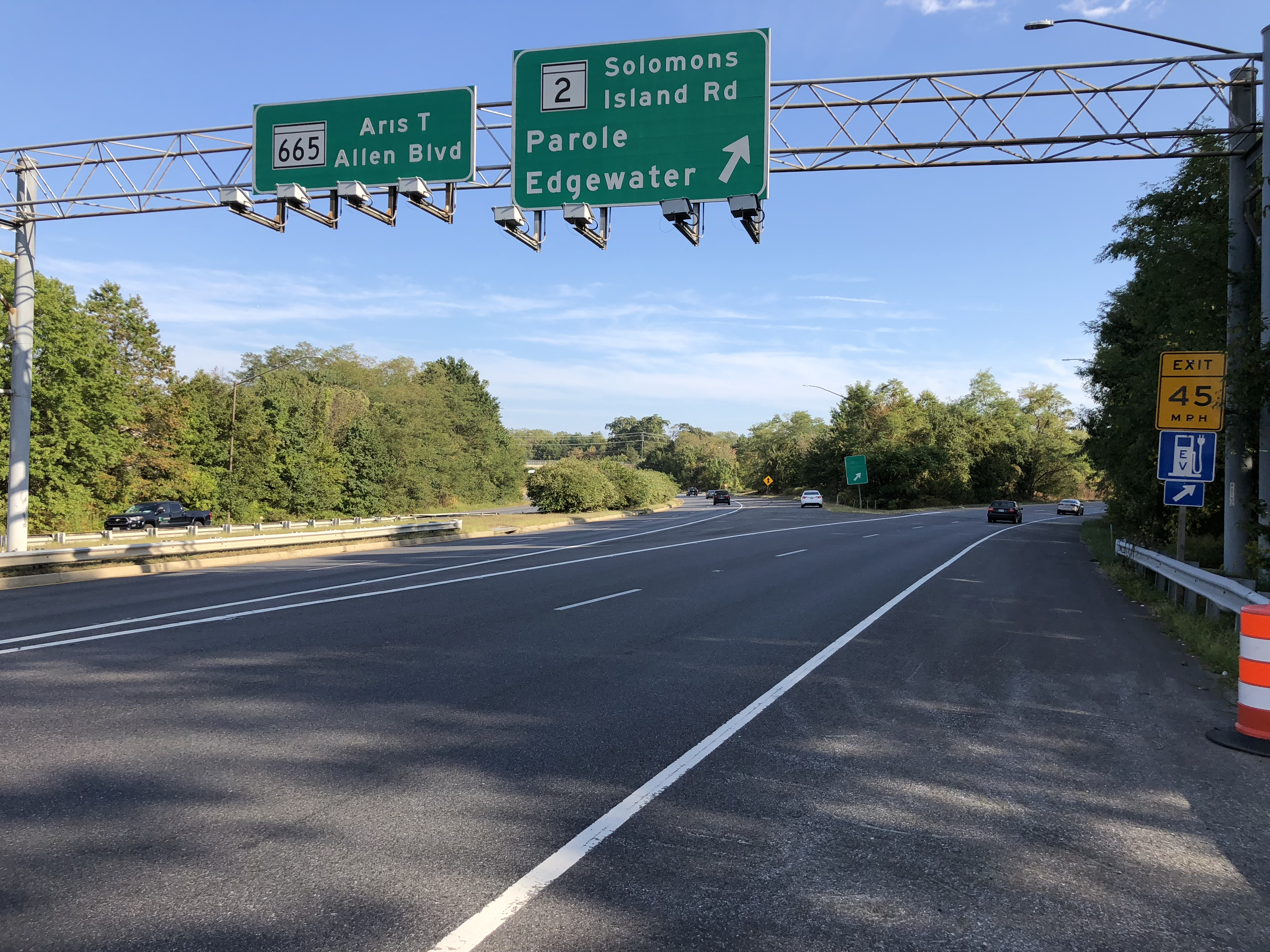
MD 665 eastbound at MD 2 in Parole

MD 665 begins at a directional interchange with US 50/US 301 and unsigned I-595 (John Hanson Highway) in Parole. The ramps from MD 665 to westbound US 50/US 301 and from eastbound US 50/US 301 to MD 665 tie into the ramps for I-97. The ramp from westbound US 50/US 301 to MD 665 forms a sweeping hairpin. MD 665 heads southeast as a four-lane freeway through a single-point urban interchange with Riva Road. The highway turns east and meets MD 2 (Solomons Island Road) at a partial cloverleaf interchange. There is also an exit ramp from westbound MD 665 to Annapolis Harbour Center Drive, which accesses the eponymous shopping center in the northwest quadrant of the interchange. Beyond MD 2, the state highway crosses Church Creek, enters the city of Annapolis, and becomes a four-lane divided highway with partial access control. After an intersection with Chinquapin Round Road, which is unsigned MD 665C, MD 665 reaches its eastern terminus at Bywater Road. The roadway continues southeast as Forest Drive, a four-lane road with a center turn lane. Forest Drive intersects MD 387 (Spa Road) and Bay Ridge Avenue on its course along the southern fringe of the city of Annapolis.

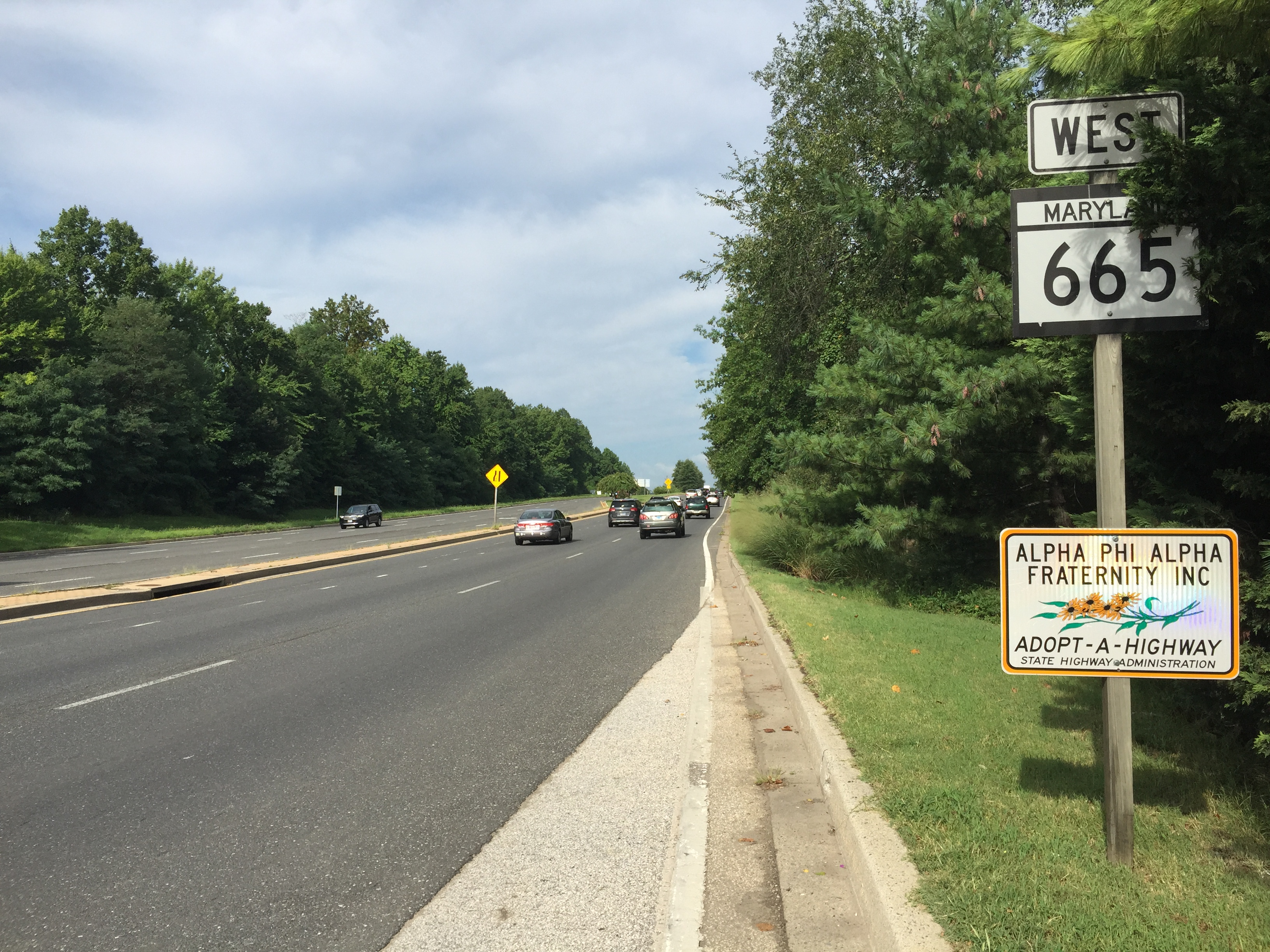
View west near the east end of MD 665 at Bywater Road in Annapolis

MD 665 is a part of the National Highway System as a principal arterial for its entire length.

== History ==
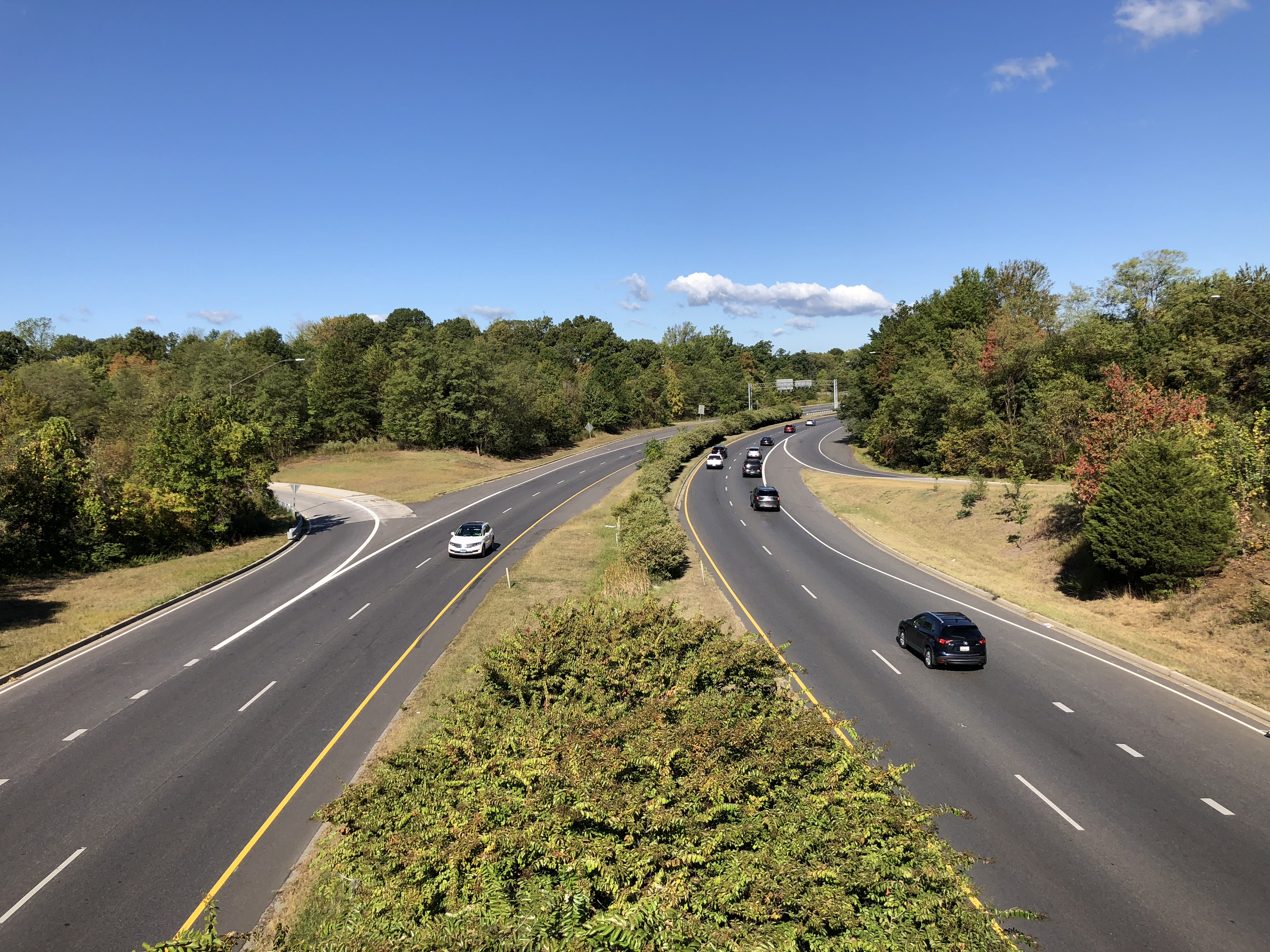
MD 665 westbound viewed from MD 2 in Parole

MD 665 was originally assigned to Forest Drive. The road existed as a county highway between MD 387 and Bay Ridge Avenue, which was then designated MD 181, by 1939. This highway was extended west to MD 2 (now MD 393) by 1946. MD 665 was assigned to the highway between MD 2 and MD 181 in 1950. MD 665 was routed along Chinquapin Round Road west of its rakish intersection with MD 387 and Neck Road east of MD 387. The whole highway was named Forest Drive in 1955, the same year the state highway was extended west to the present alignment of MD 2. The eastern end of MD 665 was relocated in 1964 to the current eastern end of Forest Drive at Bay Ridge Avenue and Hillsmere Drive. The old alignment along Forest Hills Avenue remained in the state highway system until 1972. MD 665 was relocated at its intersection with MD 387 to make the intersection less oblique in 1968. An old piece of Forest Drive in the southeast quadrant of the intersection is MD 788A (Old Forest Drive).

The original MD 665 was transferred from state maintenance to the city of Annapolis between 1987 and 1989. By 1989, modern MD 665, which was intended to mitigate congestion on the western part of Forest Drive, was under construction from US 50/US 301 southeast to MD 2. MD 665 opened from US 50/US 301 to MD 2 in 1991. The highway opened east to Forest Drive in April 1992. In October 1992, state officials named MD 665 for Aris T. Allen, a doctor and former member of the Maryland General Assembly who had died in 1991. When MD 665 was being planned in the early 1980s, Allen was instrumental in rerouting the highway to bypass an African-American neighborhood instead of slicing through and displacing its residents.

== Junction list ==
The entire route is in Anne Arundel County.

Location	mi	km	Destinations	Notes
Parole	0.00	0.00	US 50 / US 301 (John Hanson Highway) / I-97 – Washington, Baltimore, Bay Bridge	Western terminus; US 50 Exit 22; US 50 and US 301 run concurrently with unsigned I-595
Parole	0.93	1.50	Riva Road	Single-point urban interchange
Parole	1.20	1.93	Annapolis Harbour Center Drive	Westbound exit only
Parole	1.56	2.51	MD 2 (Solomons Island Road) – Parole, Edgewater	Partial cloverleaf interchange
Annapolis	1.95	3.14	east end of freeway section	
Annapolis	2.55	4.10	Chinquapin Round Road north	Unsigned MD 665C
Annapolis	2.68	4.31	Forest Drive east / Bywater Road south	Eastern terminus
1.000 mi = 1.609 km; 1.000 km = 0.621 mi: Incomplete access

== Auxiliary routes ==
There are five existing auxiliary routes of MD 665 and one former auxiliary route.

- MD 665A is the designation for Vineyard Road, a 0.05-mile (0.080 km) service road that connects eastbound MD 665 with several properties in a forested area east of Church Creek.
- MD 665B is the designation for Godspeed Way, a 0.07-mile (0.11 km) service road that connects westbound MD 665 with a farm.
- MD 665C is the designation for the 0.14-mile (0.23 km) state-maintained section of Chinquapin Round Road north from MD 665. The highway intersects Fairfax Road and becomes municipally maintained just south of Lincoln Drive within an industrial park.
- MD 665D was the designation for the 0.02-mile (0.032 km) state-maintained portion of Fairfax Road west from MD 665C. Fairfax Road provides access to the disjoint segment of Forest Drive north of MD 665. MD 665D was transferred from state to municipal maintenance in 2002.
- MD 665E is the designation for Grand Oak Drive, a 0.09-mile (0.14 km) L-shaped service road. The highway heads north from Wilelinor Drive, then turns west at MD 665F. The highway ends as the east leg of the intersection between MD 2 and the exit ramp from eastbound MD 665.
- MD 665F is the designation for Pythian Drive, a 0.19-mile (0.31 km) L-shaped service road that connects MD 665E with an Elks Lodge and the Sword and Shield Lounge of the Knights of Pythias.
