= Frederick Malkus =

American politician

Frederick C. Malkus Jr.

Member of the Maryland Senate from the 37th district
- In office 1983–1994
- Preceded by: Harry J. McGuirk
- Succeeded by: Richard F. Colburn

Member of the Maryland Senate from the 35th district
- In office 1975–1982
- Succeeded by: William H. Amoss

Member of the Maryland Senate from the 16th district
- In office 1967–1974
- Succeeded by: Newton I. Steers Jr.

Member of the Maryland Senate from the ? district
- In office 1952–1966

Member of the Maryland House of Delegates from the ? district
- In office 1947–1951

Personal details
- Born: July 1, 1913 Baltimore, Maryland
- Died: November 9, 1999 (aged 86)
- Party: Democratic
- Spouse: Margaret "Maggie" Moorer

Frederick C. Malkus Jr. (July 1, 1913 – November 9, 1999) was a Democratic state legislator from Maryland. He served in the Maryland House of Delegates from 1947 to 1951 and then in the Maryland State Senate until 1994. When he retired, he had served for 48 years, making him the longest serving legislator in the US. He never lost a re-election bid, though he did lose a 1973 congressional race to Republican Robert E. Bauman. In 1987, a new four-lane U.S. 50 bridge over the Choptank River, the Frederick C. Malkus Bridge, was named in his honor, the first bridge to be named for a living Marylander.
