= Bill Burton Fishing Pier State Park =

State park in Dorchester and Talbot counties, Maryland

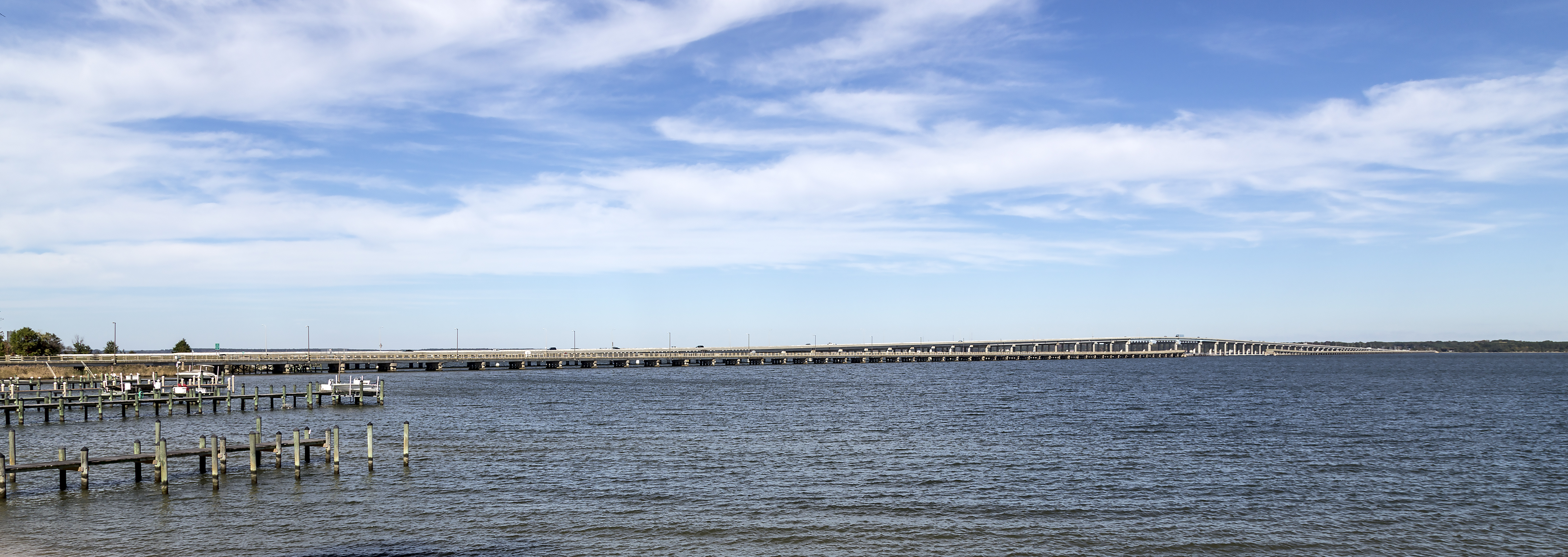
- Bill Burton Fishing Pier (foreground) and Choptank River Bridge

- Location within Maryland
- Interactive map of Bill Burton Fishing Pier; State Park
- Location: Dorchester County and Talbot County, Maryland, United States
- Nearest city: Cambridge, Maryland
- Coordinates: 38°35′26″N 76°02′40″W
- Area: 24 acres (9.7 ha)
- Established: 1987
- Administrator: Maryland Department of Natural Resources
- Status: Pier closed until further notice
- Designation: Maryland state park
- Website: Official website

Bill Burton Fishing Pier State Park (formerly the Choptank River Fishing Pier) is a Maryland state park on the Choptank River in Trappe, Maryland. The park preserves portions of the former Choptank River Bridge as a pier, and includes 25 acres (10 ha) of land upriver from the pier in Talbot County.

The fishing pier was created after the Emerson C. Harrington Bridge, which had been dedicated in 1935 by President Franklin Roosevelt, was replaced with the Frederick C. Malkus Bridge in 1987. In 2011, the pier was renamed to honor Bill Burton, a long-time outdoors writer and Chesapeake Bay fishing advocate, who played a significant role in preserving the old bridge as a fishing pier when the new bridge was constructed. The discovery of structural weakness below the waterline in 2022 resulted in the piers in both Dorchester and Talbot counties being closed until further notice.
