= Skidmore, Maryland =

Unincorporated community in Maryland, United States

- Unincorporated community
- Location within the state of Maryland Skidmore, Maryland (the United States)
- Coordinates: 39°01′16″N 76°24′55″W
- Country: United States
- State: Maryland
- County: Anne Arundel
- Time zone: UTC-5 (Eastern (EST))
  - Summer (DST): UTC-4 (EDT)

Skidmore is an unincorporated community in Anne Arundel County, Maryland, United States. The community is the western terminus of the Chesapeake Bay Bridge as well as the location of Sandy Point State Park. Sandy Point Shoal Light was listed on the National Register of Historic Places in 2002.
