= Maryland Route 450 =

Highway in Maryland

Maryland Route 450
- Maryland Route 450 highlighted in red

Route information
- Maintained by MDSHA and City of Annapolis
- Length: 30.19 mi (48.59 km)
- Existed: 1954–present
- Tourist routes: Roots and Tides Scenic Byway

Major junctions
- West end: US 1 Alt. in Bladensburg
- MD 201 in Bladensburg; Baltimore–Washington Parkway in Bladensburg; MD 410 in Landover Hills; I-95 / I-495 in New Carrollton; MD 704 in Lanham; MD 197 in Bowie; MD 3 in Crofton; MD 178 in Parole; US 50 / US 301 in Parole; MD 2 in Annapolis
- North end: US 50 / US 301 / MD 2 near Arnold

Location
- Country: United States
- State: Maryland
- Counties: Prince George's, Anne Arundel

Highway system
- Maryland highway system; Interstate; US; State; Scenic Byways
← MD 449	→ MD 452

Maryland Route 450 (MD 450) is a state highway in the U.S. state of Maryland. The state highway runs 30.19 miles (48.59 km) from U.S. Route 1 Alternate (US 1 Alternate) in Bladensburg east to US 50/US 301 and MD 2 near Arnold. MD 450 forms a local complement to US 50 from near Washington, D.C. through Annapolis. In Prince George's County, the highway is a four- to six-lane divided highway that serves Bladensburg, Landover Hills, New Carrollton, Lanham, and Bowie. In Anne Arundel County, MD 450 connects Crofton with Parole and Annapolis with the portion of the county east of the Severn River. The highway serves as one of the main streets of Annapolis, including the state capital's historic core, and is the primary vehicular access to the U.S. Naval Academy.

MD 450 is the old alignment of US 50 from Bladensburg to Parole and of MD 2 from Parole to the Severn River. The MD 2 portion of the highway was constructed in the early to mid-1910s except for the first modern bridge across the Severn River, which was completed in the mid-1920s. The US 50 section of the highway was started from either end in the late 1910s and completed in the mid-1920s, shortly before the US 50 and MD 2 designations were assigned to the respective highways. As they were part of the main highways between Washington and Annapolis and from Annapolis to Baltimore, all segments of what is now MD 450 were improved in the 1920s and 1930s. The highway from the Severn River to Arnold was constructed as a relocated MD 2 in the late 1930s. MD 450 was first assigned from Crofton to Arnold in 1954 after US 50 was moved to its present freeway from Bowie to Arnold. The state highway was extended west to Bladensburg in 1962 when the US 50 freeway was completed from Bowie to Washington. MD 450 was expanded to a divided highway from Bladensburg to Lanham in the mid-1960s and from Lanham to Bowie in the early to mid-2000s.

== Route description ==
MD 450 is a part of the National Highway System as a principal arterial from MD 201 to MD 202 in Bladensburg, from MD 704 in Lanham to MD 3 in Bowie, and from US 50/US 301 in Parole to those same highways and MD 2 at the route's eastern terminus in Arnold.

=== Bladensburg to Bowie ===
MD 450 begins at a directional intersection with US 1 Alternate in the town of Bladensburg just southeast of the confluence of the Northwest and Northeast Branches of the Anacostia River to form the river proper. US 1 Alternate heads southwest as Bladensburg Road into Colmar Manor and north as Baltimore Avenue toward Hyattsville. Adjacent to the center intersection of the junction is the Peace Cross, a memorial to World War I soldiers. MD 450 heads east as Annapolis Road, a four-lane road with a center left-turn lane that passes under the Alexandria Extension of CSX's Capital Subdivision railroad line. East of the railroad underpass, the highway has a partial cloverleaf interchange with MD 201 (Kenilworth Avenue). 48th Street, which connects MD 450 with northbound MD 201 in both directions, is unsigned MD 769C. Within and surrounding the interchange are the historic William Hilleary House, Market Master's House, and the estate Bostwick.

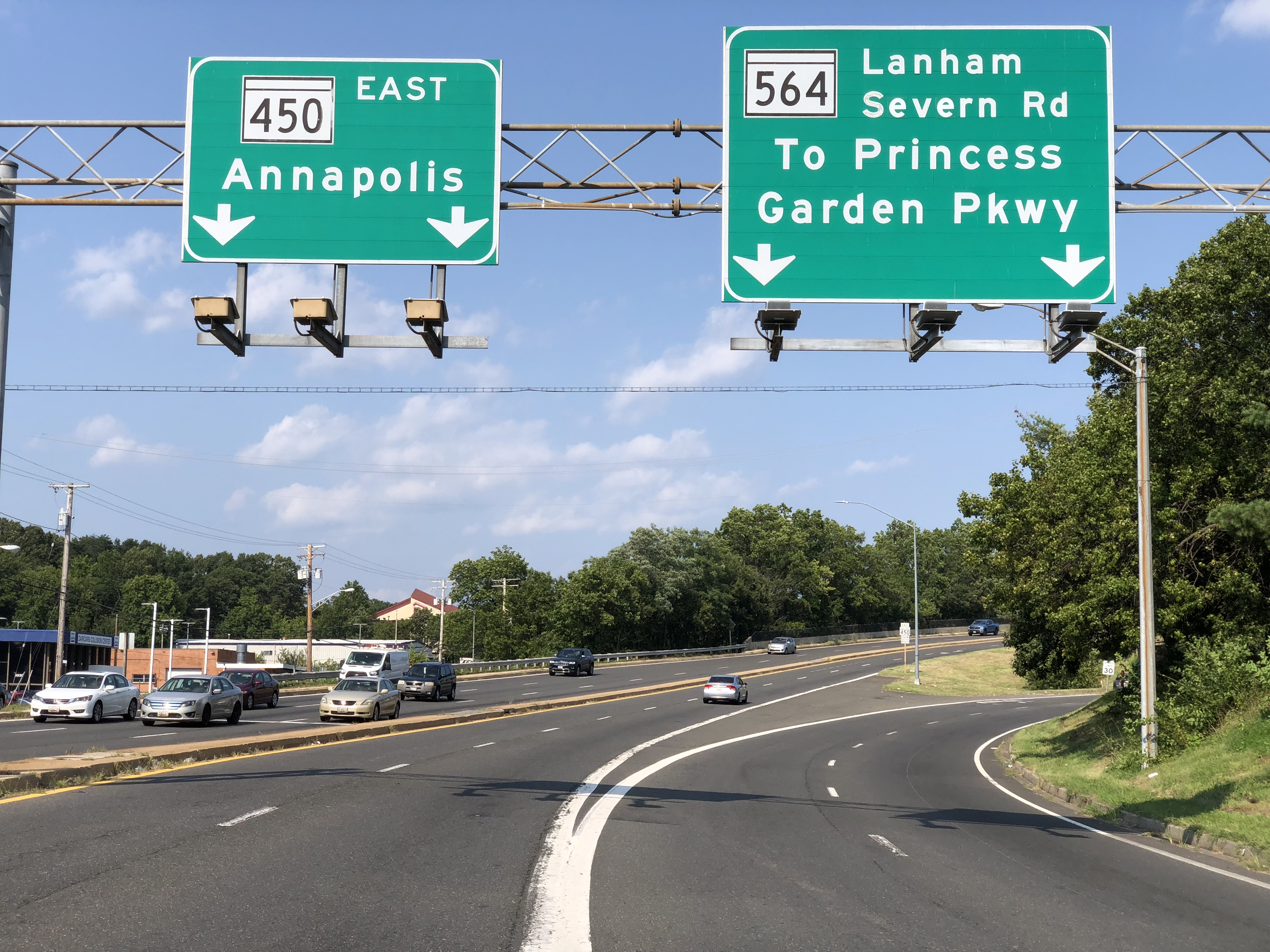
MD 450 eastbound at MD 564 in Lanham

East of 48th Street, MD 450 intersects the southern end of Edmonston Road, which is unsigned MD 769B. The highway meets the northern end of MD 202 (Landover Road) at an acute intersection; there is no direct access from westbound MD 450 to southbound MD 202. MD 450 continues as a six-lane divided highway and leaves the town of Bladensburg at its partial cloverleaf interchange with the Baltimore–Washington Parkway. The highway passes between the town of Landover Hills and the unincorporated area of Woodlawn and intersects MD 410 (Veterans Parkway). MD 450 briefly passes through the city of New Carrollton, intersecting 85th Avenue (unsigned MD 433), before its partial cloverleaf interchange with Interstate 95 (I-95)/I-495 (Capital Beltway). East of the Beltway in the center of Lanham, westbound MD 450 has a signalized right-in/right-out intersection with Princess Garden Parkway and the route has a partial interchange with the west end of MD 564 (Lanham Severn Road). Eastbound MD 450 has access to Princess Garden Parkway by turning around at MD 564's intersection with Cipriano Road, but there is no direct access from MD 564 to eastbound MD 450, from westbound MD 450 to MD 564, or from Princess Garden Parkway to either eastbound MD 450 or MD 564. MD 450 reduces to four lanes on its bridge across the ramp from eastbound MD 450 to MD 564 and Amtrak's Northeast Corridor railroad line.

MD 450 meets the northern end of Whitfield Chapel Road just east of the railroad bridge. The highway passes along the southern edge of the unincorporated area of Seabrook, then meets the eastern end of MD 704 (Martin Luther King Jr. Highway). MD 450 continues as a six-lane divided highway and intersects MD 953 (Glenn Dale Road). East of MD 193, which heads north as Glenn Dale Boulevard and south as Enterprise Road, MD 450 reduces to four lanes. Just after the route enters the city of Bowie, Old Annapolis Road (MD 450B, signed as MD 450 Old) splits to the east as MD 450 veers northeast to cross over CSX's Popes Creek Subdivision railroad line and intersect MD 197 (Laurel Bowie Road). The highway passes south of Bowie High School and becomes a four-lane undivided highway at Stonybrook Drive. It drops to two lanes as it leaves the city of Bowie east of Race Track Road and west of historic Sacred Heart Church. MD 450 then expands to a four-lane divided highway just west of its intersection with MD 3 (Robert Crain Highway). MD 450 turns to run concurrently with MD 3. The two state highways follow a six-lane divided highway over the Patuxent River at Priest Bridge, thereby crossing the Prince George's–Anne Arundel county line.

=== Crofton to Arnold ===
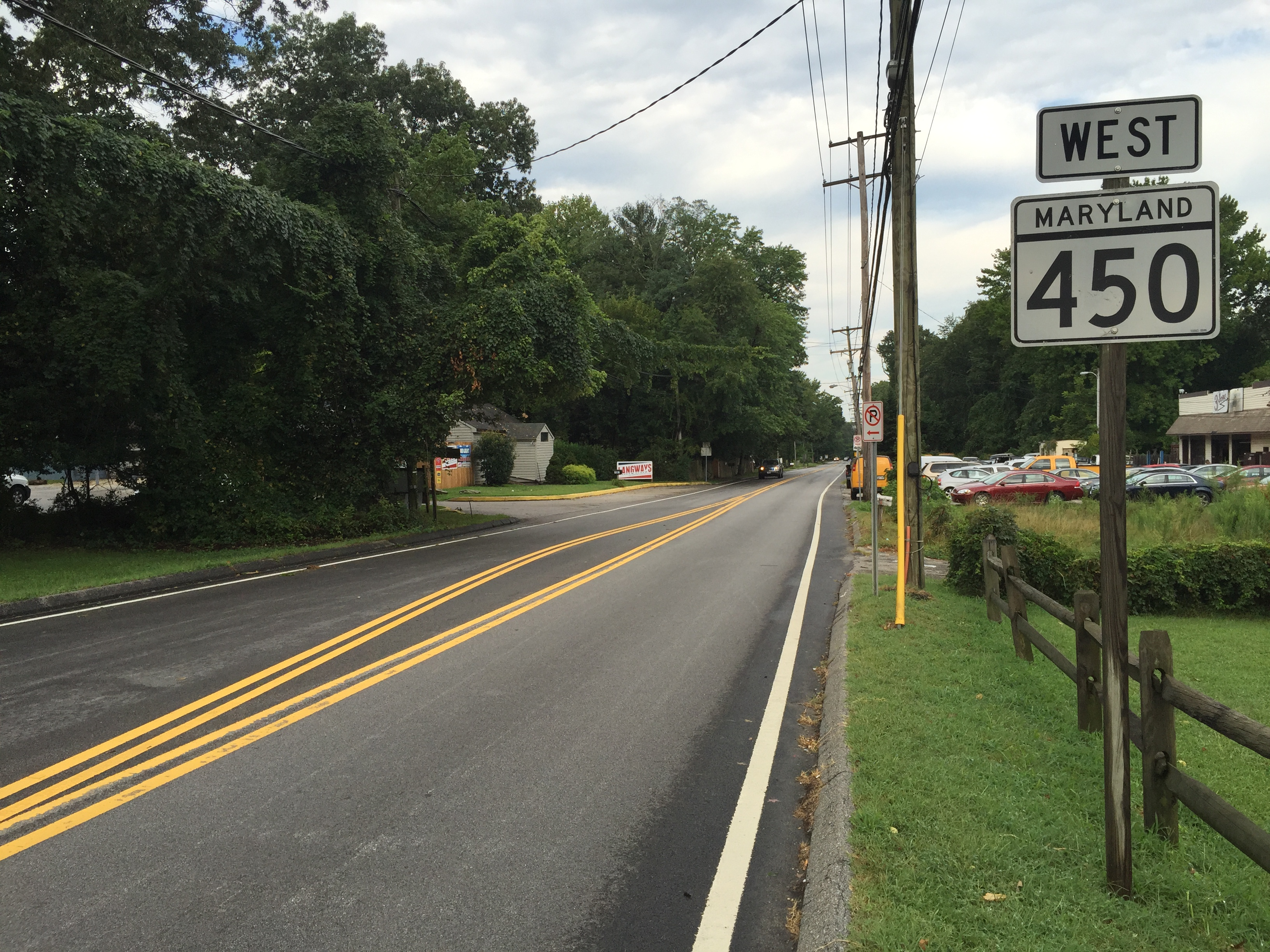
View west along MD 450 at MD 424 in western Anne Arundel County

MD 450 splits from MD 3 onto Defense Highway, which starts as a four-lane divided highway but gradually reduces to two lanes as the route passes along the southern edge of Crofton. At the southeast end of the unincorporated community, the highway intersects MD 424 (Davidsonville Road). MD 450 continues along a curvy path through a forested area in which it crosses the North River and the South River and intersects Crownsville Road, which leads north to the Maryland Renaissance Festival. MD 450 passes under I-97 with no access and enters Parole, where the highway expands to four lanes with a center turn lane. The highway turns southeast onto West Street at its intersection with MD 178 (Generals Highway); the east leg of the intersection is an entrance to the Westfield Annapolis shopping mall. MD 450 has an oblique four-ramp partial cloverleaf with US 50/US 301 (John Hanson Highway), which run concurrently with unsigned I-595. The streets that form the fourth legs of the intersections with the westbound and eastbound ramps with the freeway are Jennifer Road and Riva Road, respectively.

MD 450 temporarily expands to a divided highway from west of MD 2 (Solomons Island Road) to east of MD 393 (Old Solomons Island Road); between those two highways, MD 450 enters the city of Annapolis. The highway reduces to two lanes east of Chinquapin Round Road and meets the southern end of MD 435 (Taylor Avenue) and the northern end of MD 387 (Spa Road) at the Westgate Circle roundabout next to Annapolis National Cemetery. MD 450 continues into the Colonial Annapolis Historic District as a municipally maintained street. The road surface changes to brick for the one block before the highway enters Church Circle, a traffic circle that circumscribes St. Anne's Church. The streets that emanate from the circle include Franklin Street, which leads to the Banneker-Douglass Museum; South Street, which passes the Old City Hall and Engine House; Duke of Gloucester Street and Main Street, a non-parallel pair of one-way streets that head toward and from the city's docks; School Street, which leads to State Circle, which is unsigned MD 797 and circumscribes the Maryland State House; Northwest Street, which enters the circle from the namesake direction; and College Avenue, onto which MD 450 continues.

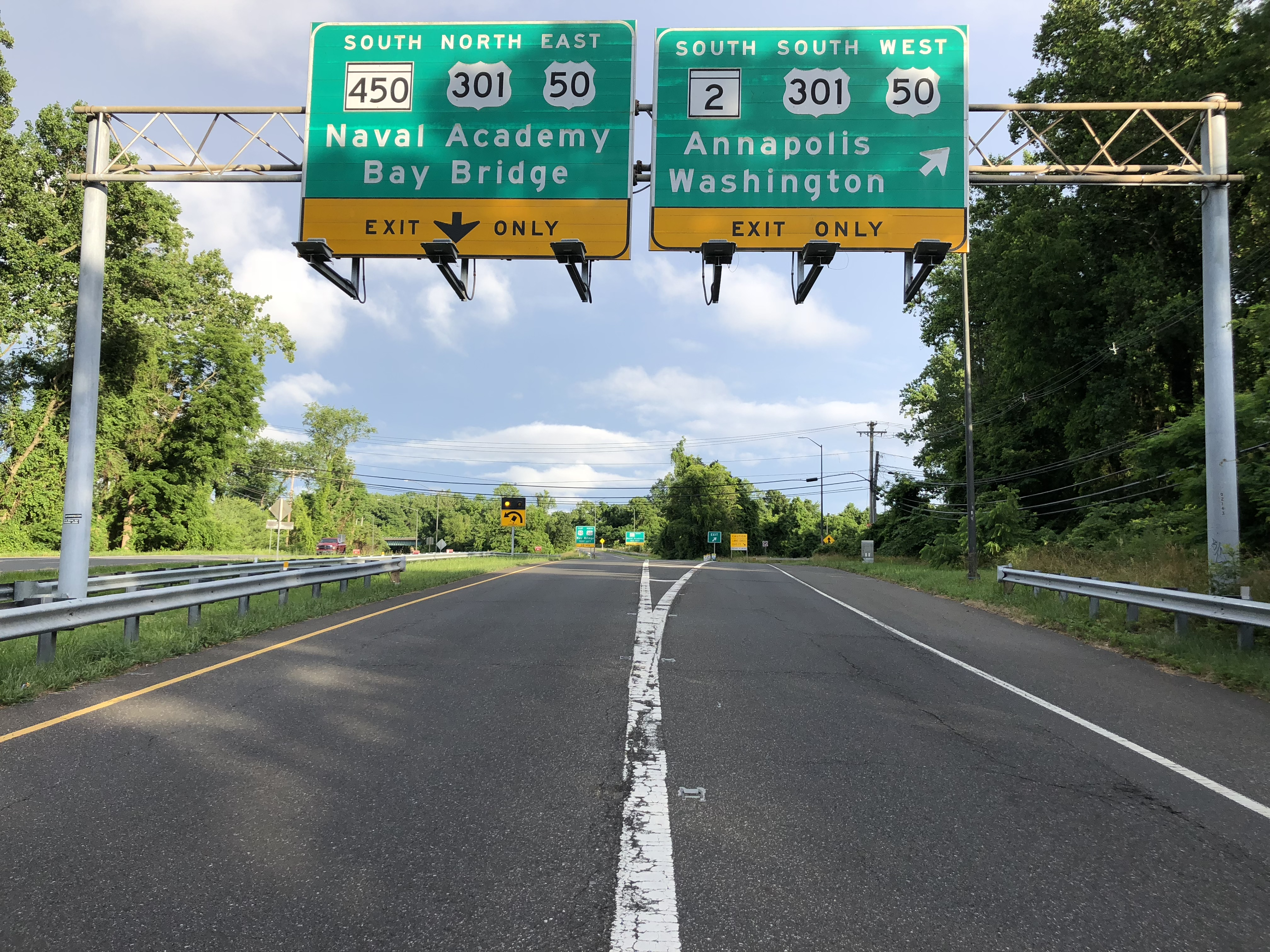
View westbound at the eastern end of MD 450 at US 50/US 301/MD 2 in Arnold

MD 450 passes Government House, the residence of the Governor of Maryland, and meets the southern end of MD 70 (Bladen Street) directly northwest of the State House. The highway passes along the edge of St. John's College to King George Street, onto which the route turns northwest. MD 450 follows King George Street along the edge of the U.S. Naval Academy reservation to College Creek, where the highway becomes state maintained again and leaves the city of Annapolis. The highway continues through the census-designated place of Naval Academy, which includes the grounds of the military academy, to the northern end of MD 435 (Annapolis Street), where MD 450 turns northeast onto Baltimore–Annapolis Boulevard and, after a few more blocks through the reservation, the highway crosses the Severn River on the high-level Naval Academy Bridge. At the north end of the bridge, the highway meets the southern end of MD 648 (Baltimore–Annapolis Boulevard), which leads to an access road to Jonas Green Park on the north side of the bridge. MD 450 continues along Governor Ritchie Highway, a four-lane divided highway that contains the Maryland World War II Memorial in the median just north of MD 648. The highway curves to the northwest and MD 450 reaches its eastern terminus at a three-level interchange with US 50/US 301/MD 2 (Blue Star Memorial Highway) just east of the Severn River Bridge in Arnold. After a diversion through the interchange, Governor Ritchie Highway continues north toward Baltimore carrying MD 2.

== History ==
=== Original construction ===
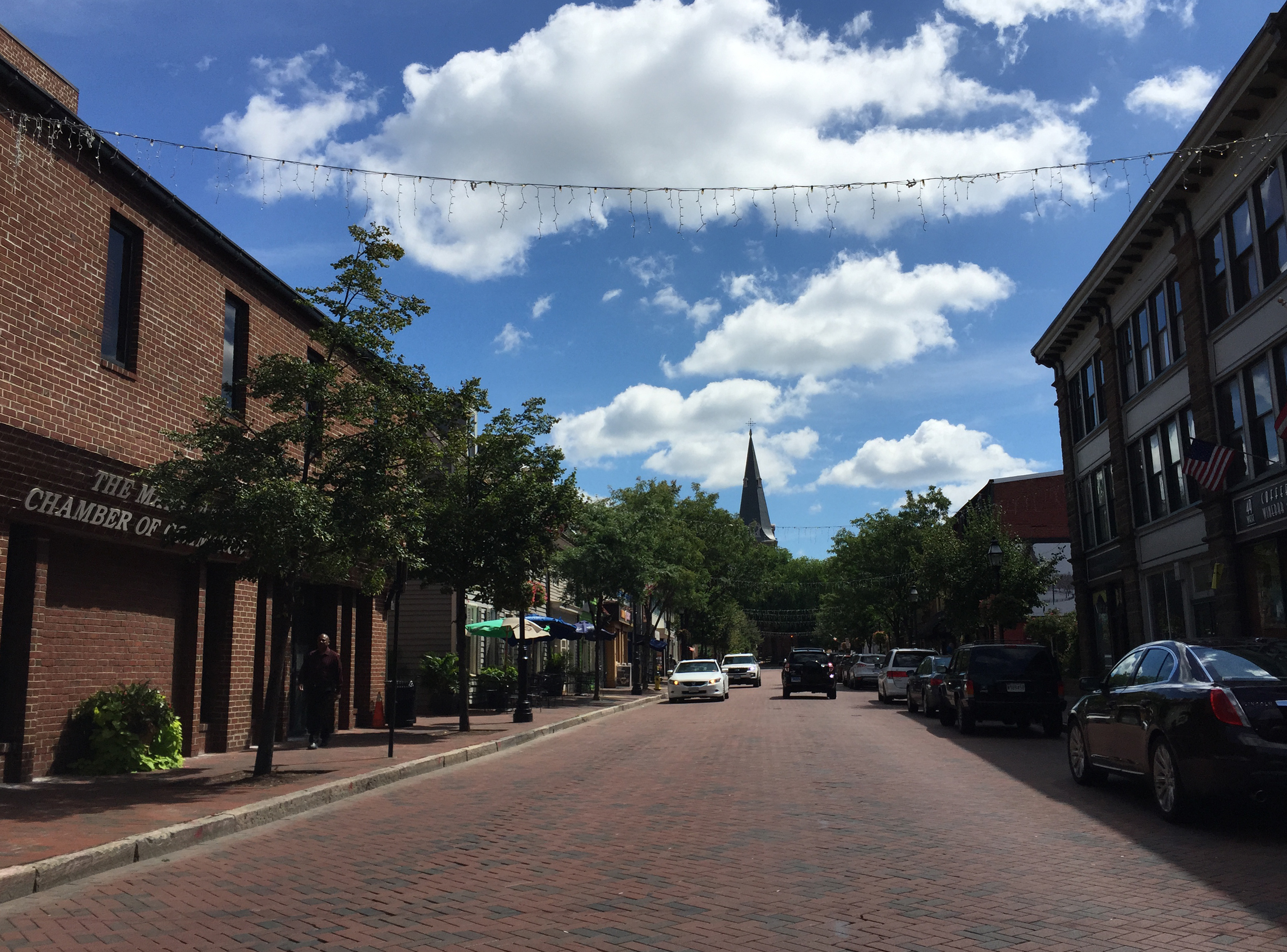
MD 450 eastbound along West Street in Annapolis, which is surfaced with bricks

MD 450 from Bladensburg to the Severn River was proposed as one of the original state roads laid out by the Maryland State Roads Commission (MDSRC) in 1909. The first portion of the highway was built as a 16-foot-wide (4.9 m) concrete road from Solomons Island Road (now MD 393) east to the city limits of Annapolis at Spa Road in 1914. The portion of the highway from Wagner Street at the city limits of Annapolis to the Severn River was proposed as the southernmost section of the Baltimore–Annapolis Boulevard (now MD 648), which was completed from the north side of the Severn River to Glen Burnie between 1910 and 1912. After litigation between the roads commission and Anne Arundel County, the result of which required the state to replace the bridge across College Creek, MDSRC constructed a new bridge across the creek in 1914 and 1915. The highway through the Naval Academy reservation from College Creek to the south side of the Severn River was built as a 16-foot-wide (4.9 m) macadam road in 1916. The final gap in the Baltimore–Annapolis Boulevard was filled when the first modern Severn River Bridge was completed in 1924. This 1,850-foot-long (560 m) concrete bridge, which had a roadway width of 22 feet (6.7 m) and a steel bascule draw with a horizontal clearance of 75 feet (23 m), replaced a narrow one-lane bridge.

None of the highway from Bladensburg to Parole was completed by 1915. Construction of this highway started after a 1918 appropriation from the Maryland General Assembly specifically to construct the National Defense Highway, so named because it would connect the national capital with the Naval Academy. The first section built was from the Baltimore–Washington Boulevard east to approximately the location of the Baltimore–Washington Parkway in 1919. The second section of the Defense Highway, from there to near what is now MD 410 in Landover Hills, was started that same year and completed by 1921. Near Annapolis, another portion of the highway was built near the Annapolis Waterworks in 1920 and 1921. The western portion was extended east through Lanham to the Washington, Baltimore and Annapolis Electric Railway (WB&A) at Buena Vista near what is now MD 704 by 1923. The portion of Robert Crain Highway with which the Defense Highway crosses the Patuxent River was paved by 1923; a new reinforced concrete girder bridge was completed at the site in 1925. Other major structures along the route included a steel and concrete girder bridge across the Popes Creek Subdivision near Bowie in 1926 and reinforced concrete girder bridges across the North River and the South River completed in 1925. The fully concrete Defense Highway was finished in December 1926.

=== Improvements ===
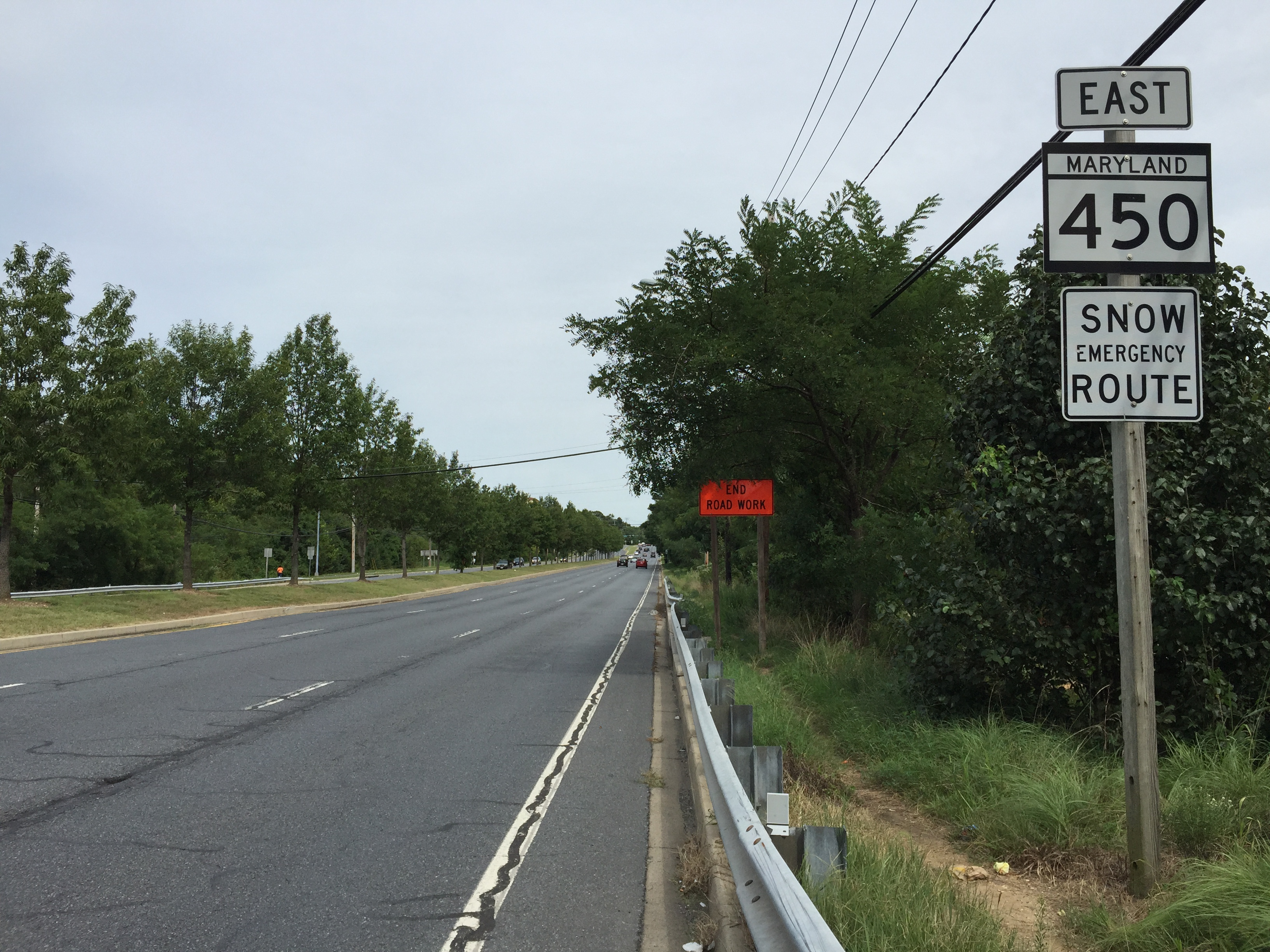
MD 450 eastbound at MD 704 in Mitchellville

When the U.S. Highway System was established in 1926, US 50 was placed on all of Defense Highway and West Street into Annapolis. The U.S. Highway continued from Church Circle along East Street and King George Street to its national eastern terminus at the Annapolis terminal of the Annapolis–Claiborne ferry across the Chesapeake Bay. When MDSRC first assigned state route numbers in 1927, MD 2 followed the present course of MD 450 from Solomons Island Road (now MD 393) to the north end of the Severn River Bridge, where the state highway continued along the Baltimore–Annapolis Boulevard. Improvements to the highways began immediately after they were numbered. The portion of MD 2 through the Naval Academy reservation was widened to 22 feet (6.7 m) with a pair of 3-foot-wide (0.91 m) concrete shoulders in 1927. The entire length of Defense Highway was widened from 15 to 16 feet (4.6 to 4.9 m) to 20 feet (6.1 m) in 1930. US 50's bridges across the Pennsylvania Railroad (now Amtrak's Northeast Corridor) at Lanham and the WB&A at Buena Vista were started in 1930. By 1934, the MDSRC recommended MD 2 from Annapolis to Arnold be widened to 40 feet (12 m). US 50 was proposed to be widened from 20 to 40 feet (6.1 to 12.2 m) from US 1 (now US 1 Alternate) at the Peace Cross in Bladensburg east to MD 564 in Lanham and from MD 387 in Annapolis west to MD 178 in Parole, and to 30 feet (9.1 m) from Lanham to Parole.

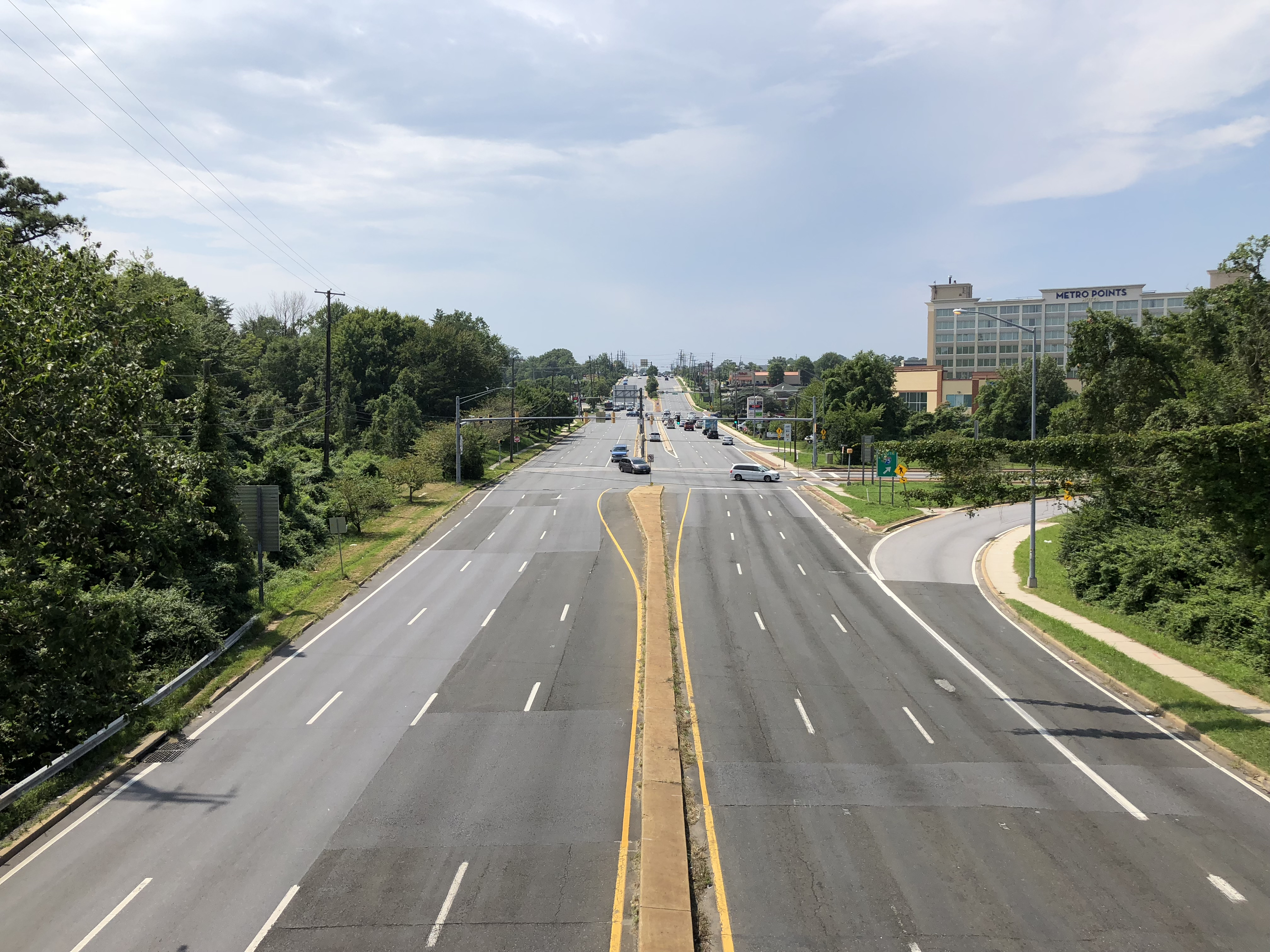
MD 450 westbound entering New Carrollton at I-95/I-495

The first efforts for the mass widening of these highways came in 1938. That year, US 50 was widened to 40 feet (12 m) immediately to the east of the Peace Cross intersection in Bladensburg. In addition, the present alignment of MD 450 from the Severn River north to Arnold was completed as the southernmost portion of Governor Ritchie Highway. This segment of the new highway was initially completed as a 20-foot-wide (6.1 m) two-lane highway, the present southbound lanes. The northbound lanes of the new MD 2 were completed from Annapolis to Arnold in 1940. The Peace Cross intersection was channelized and US 50 was expanded to a width of 27 feet (8.2 m) from Bladensburg to Lanham between 1940 and 1942. By 1940, MDSRC recommended the Defense Highway be completed rebuilt, preferably on a new location. The roads commission suggested widening of the Severn River Bridge by 1942. However, by 1944, a new bridge was proposed upstream of the existing bridge because the U.S. Navy desired a relocation. US 50 was extended east along modern MD 450 through Annapolis and across the Severn River to what had been MD 404 as part of its extension to Ocean City in 1949.

=== Replacement and recent improvements ===
Construction on the Annapolis–Washington Expressway (now John Hanson Highway) began in 1949 between US 301 in Bowie and what is now MD 450 in Parole. The new freeway opened to traffic in 1952. Construction on the new bridge over the Severn River began in 1950 and was completed in 1952, the same year work began on the Annapolis Bypass between Parole and Arnold. The Annapolis Bypass opened from MD 450 in Parole to the three-level Ritchie–Revell interchange between US 50, MD 2, and MD 450 in June 1954. That same year, US 50 was moved to the new freeway from Bowie to Arnold and MD 450 was assigned to the old highway from US 301 (now MD 3) in Crofton to its present eastern terminus in Arnold. MD 450 was expanded to a divided highway from west of MD 2 to east of MD 393 in 1956. In addition, the portion of MD 450 that is concurrent with MD 3 was expanded to a divided highway, including a new bridge across the Patuxent River, between 1956 and 1958. The only major changes to MD 450 in Anne Arundel County since the 1950s have been bridge replacements. The highway's bridge across College Creek was replaced in 1987. The Severn River Bridge was replaced with the Naval Academy Bridge in 1995.

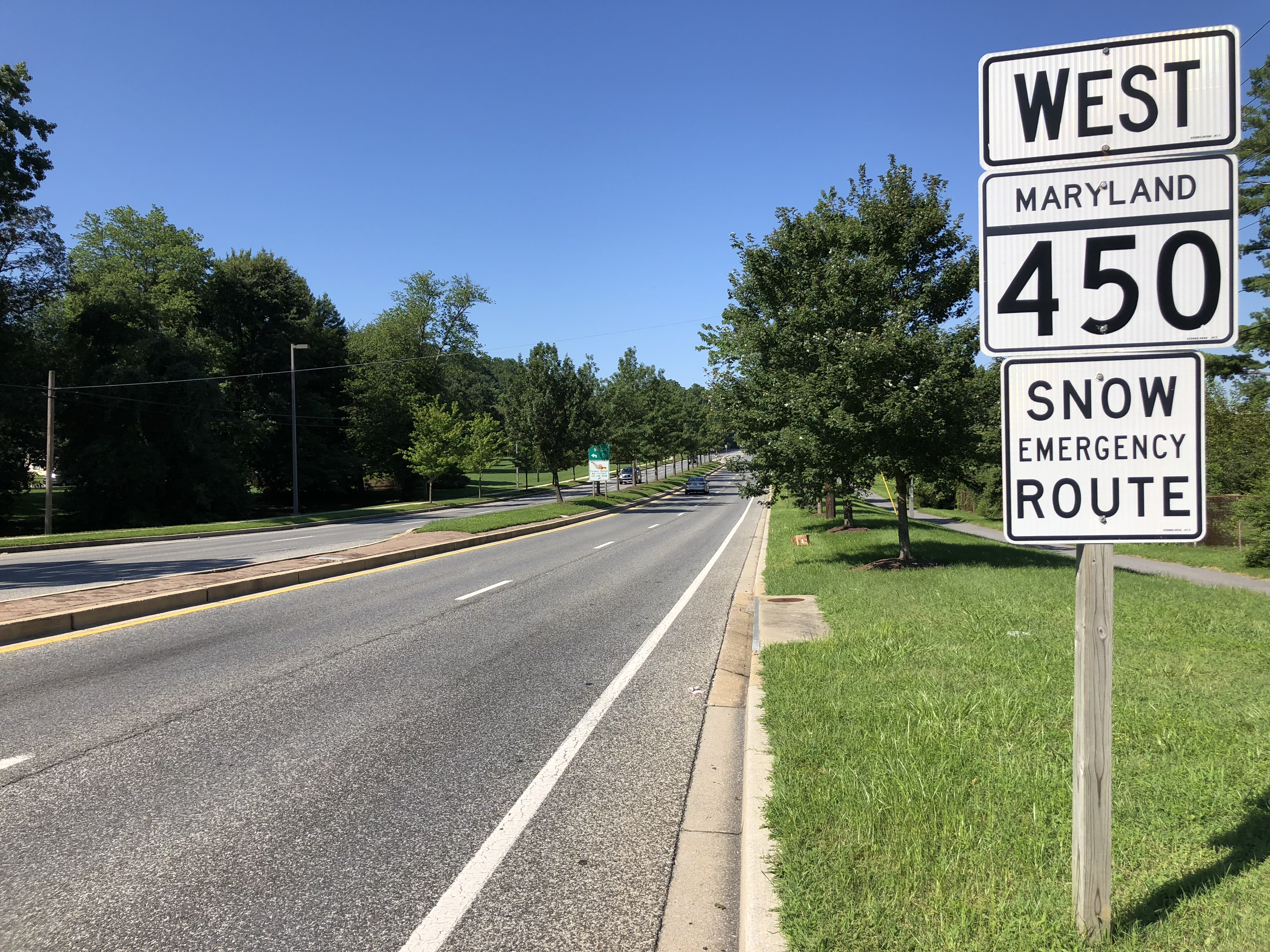
MD 450 westbound in Bowie

In Prince George's County, the extension of John Hanson Highway west toward Washington began in 1953. The freeway was completed west to MD 704 in 1957. US 50 remained signed along Defense Highway in Prince George's County; instead, the new freeway and MD 704 southwest into Washington were designated Temporary US 50 by 1958. US 50 was assigned to John Hanson Highway west of US 301 when the freeway was completed into Washington in 1962. That same year, MD 450 was extended west along US 50's old route to its present western terminus at US 1 Alternate in Bladensburg. MD 450's interchange with MD 201 was constructed in 1954 and 1955. Starting in 1956, the Peace Cross intersection was raised to a higher elevation above the Anacostia River and reconstructed to reduce the risk of flooding. The first divided highway segments in the county were immediately to the east of the MD 202 split and from the Baltimore–Washington Parkway east to Landover Hills, which were expanded in 1963. The gap between the divided highway sections was filled in 1965. MD 450 was expanded to a divided highway from just west of the Capital Beltway to MD 564 in Lanham in 1966 and between Landover Hills and the Beltway in 1967.

MD 450 was renamed Annapolis Road in Prince George's County in 1970. In 1985, the road was expanded to a divided highway on either side of its modern intersection with MD 193, which had been relocated onto Glenn Dale Boulevard that year. MD 450 was expanded to a divided highway from MD 564 to Whitfield Chapel Road east of the Amtrak Northeast Corridor in 1993; its interchange with MD 564 was built the same year. The first step in expanding the highway from Lanham to Bowie occurred in 2000 when the MD 704 intersection was relocated and the highway was widened from Forbes Boulevard to just east of the new MD 704 intersection. The following year, the divided highway was extended east from MD 704 to the existing divided highway at the MD 193 intersection. In 2005, the expansion of MD 450 from Lanham to Bowie was completed when the segments from Whitfield Chapel Road to Forbes Boulevard and from MD 193 to east of Stonybrook Drive in Bowie was completed. The only major relocation in the highway was from west of the Popes Creek Subdivision to east of MD 197. The old road from the western split to MD 197 was redesignated MD 450B.

== Junction list ==
MD 450 is signed east–west from US 1 Alt in Bladensburg to MD 435 in Naval Academy and north–south from MD 435 to US 50/US 301/MD 2 in Arnold.

County	Location	mi	km	Destinations	Notes
Prince George's	Bladensburg	0.00	0.00	US 1 Alt. (Bladensburg Road/Baltimore Avenue) – Hyattsville, Washington	Western terminus
Prince George's	Bladensburg	0.27	0.43	MD 201 (Kenilworth Avenue) – Cheverly, Riverdale Park, Washington, Beltsville	Partial cloverleaf interchange; access to and from northbound MD 201 is via unsigned MD 769C (48th Street)
Prince George's	Bladensburg	0.42	0.68	Edmonston Road north – Edmonston	Southern terminus of Edmonston Road; unsigned MD 769B
Prince George's	Bladensburg	0.93	1.50	MD 202 east (Landover Road) – Landover, Largo	No direct access from westbound MD 450 to eastbound MD 202
Prince George's	Bladensburg	1.52	2.45	Baltimore–Washington Parkway (MD 295) – Baltimore, BWI Marshall Airport, Washington	Interchange
Prince George's	Landover Hills	3.44	5.54	MD 410 (Veterans Parkway) to US 50 – Riverdale Park, New Carrollton, Glenarden, Hyattsville	
Prince George's	New Carrollton	4.44	7.15	85th Avenue (MD 433 south)	Northern terminus of unsigned MD 433
Prince George's	Lanham	4.65	7.48	I-95 / I-495 (Capital Beltway) – College Park, Baltimore, Andrews AFB, Richmond	I-95/I-495 exit 20
Prince George's	Lanham	4.95	7.97	MD 564 east (Lanham–Severn Road) / Princess Garden Parkway / Cipriano Road – Glenn Dale, Bowie	Eastbound exit, westbound entrance; western terminus of MD 564
Prince George's	Lanham	7.32	11.78	MD 704 west (Martin Luther King Jr. Highway) – Glenarden, Seat Pleasant	Eastern terminus of MD 704
Prince George's	Glenn Dale	7.87	12.67	MD 953 (Glenn Dale Road)	
Prince George's	Glenn Dale	8.79	14.15	MD 193 (Glenn Dale Boulevard/Enterprise Road) – Greenbelt, Upper Marlboro, Woodmore	
Prince George's	Bowie	11.38	18.31	MD 197 (Laurel–Bowie Road) to US 50 / US 301 – Laurel, Upper Marlboro	
Prince George's	Bowie	14.10	22.69	MD 3 south (Robert Crain Highway) – Upper Marlboro	Western end of MD 3 concurrency
Anne Arundel	Crofton	14.58	23.46	MD 3 north (Robert Crain Highway) – Crofton	Eastern end of MD 3 concurrency
Anne Arundel	Crofton	16.34	26.30	MD 424 (Davidsonville Road) – Davidsonville, Odenton	
Anne Arundel	Parole	23.63	38.03	MD 178 north (Generals Highway) – Crownsville	Southern terminus of MD 178
Anne Arundel	Parole	23.80	38.30	US 50 west / US 301 south (I-595, John Hanson Highway) to I-97 north / Jennifer Road east – Baltimore, Washington, Richmond	US 50 exit 23
Anne Arundel	Parole	24.09	38.77	US 50 east / US 301 north (John Hanson Highway) / Riva Road south – Bay Bridge	
Anne Arundel	Annapolis	24.33	39.16	MD 2 (Solomons Island Road) to US 50 / US 301 – Parole	
Anne Arundel	Annapolis	24.50	39.43	MD 393 south (Old Solomons Island Road)	Northern terminus of MD 393
Anne Arundel	Annapolis	26.10	42.00	MD 435 north (Taylor Avenue) / MD 387 south (Spa Road)	Westgate Circle roundabout; southern terminus of MD 435; northern terminus of MD 387
Anne Arundel	Annapolis	26.92	43.32	MD 70 west (Bladen Street) to US 50	Eastern terminus of MD 70
Anne Arundel	Naval Academy	27.78	44.71	MD 435 south (Annapolis Street) to US 50 – Baltimore, Washington	Northern terminus of MD 435
Anne Arundel	Severn River	28.18– 28.73	45.35– 46.24	Naval Academy Bridge	
Anne Arundel		28.76	46.28	MD 648 north (Baltimore–Annapolis Boulevard)	Southern terminus of MD 648; officially MD 648A
Anne Arundel	Arnold	30.19	48.59	US 50 / US 301 (John Hanson Highway/Blue Star Memorial Highway) / MD 2 (Governor Ritchie Highway) – Baltimore, Washington, Bay Bridge	US 50 exit 27; eastern terminus
1.000 mi = 1.609 km; 1.000 km = 0.621 mi: Concurrency terminus; Incomplete access

== Auxiliary routes ==
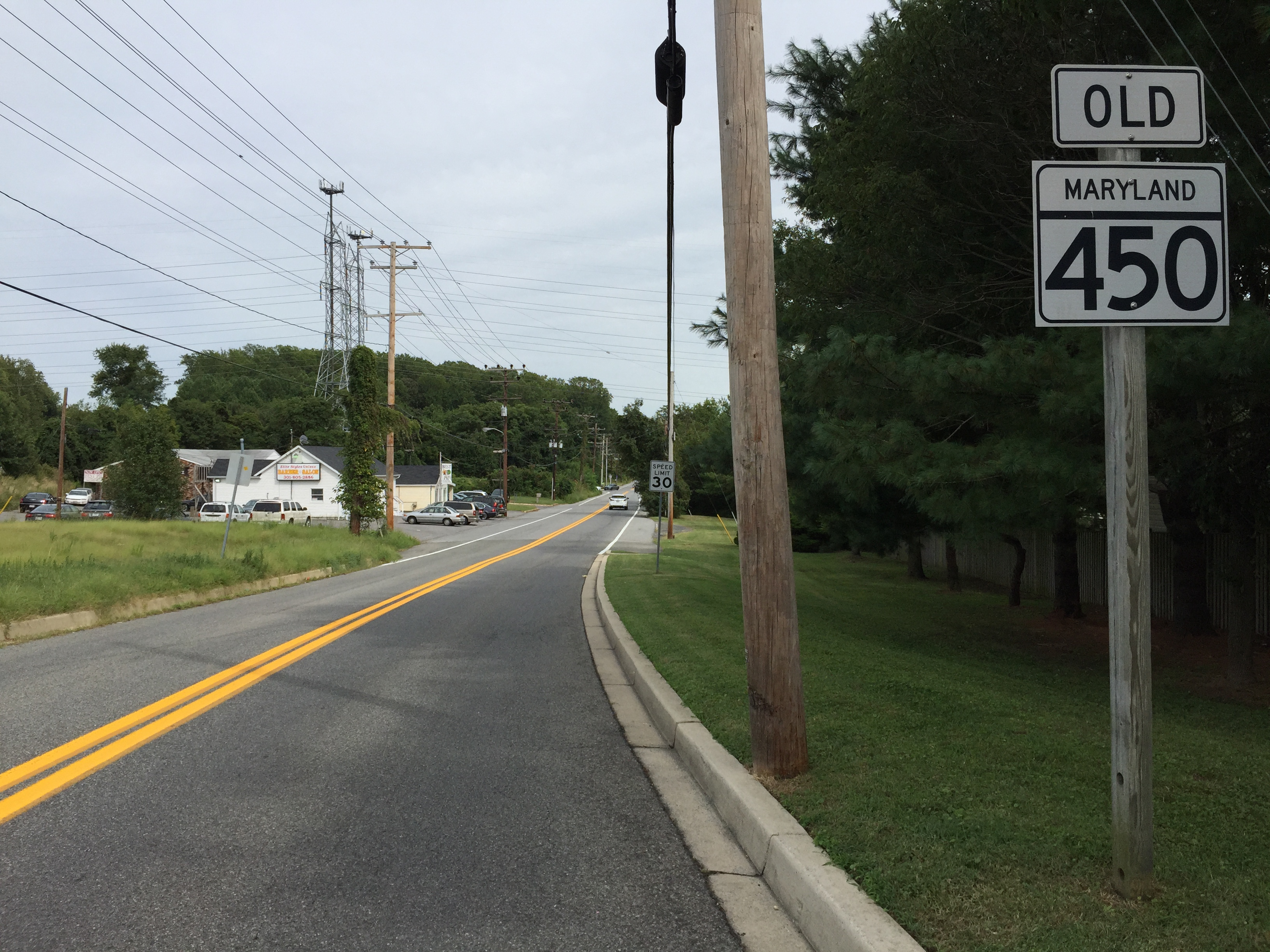
Old MD 450 (officially MD 450B) in Bowie

MD 450 has six auxiliary routes. MD 450A is in Lanham; the remainder are in Bowie.

- MD 450A is the designation for an unnamed 0.20-mile (0.32 km) segment of the old alignment of MD 450 that parallels the westbound direction of the highway at its intersection with MD 704 in Lanham. MD 450A was assigned in 2000 when MD 450 was relocated at the MD 704 junction in Lanham.
- MD 450B, signed as MD 450 Old, is the designation for two-lane undivided Old Annapolis Road, which runs 0.94 miles (1.51 km) from MD 450 east to MD 197. The highway starts at a right-in/right-out intersection with eastbound MD 450. MD 450B starts heading south, then turns east at its intersection with MD 450C. The highway meets the southern end of MD 450E, which provides full access to MD 450, then veers away from MD 450. MD 450B curves northeast as it crosses over the Popes Creek Subdivision rail line and reaches its eastern end at MD 197. MD 450B was assigned in 2005 when MD 450's new alignment was completed on either side of MD 197.
- MD 450C is the designation for the unnamed 0.03-mile (0.048 km) spur from MD 450B's right-angle turn west to a Lidl store. MD 450C was built and assigned in 2005.
- MD 450D is the designation for the 0.04-mile (0.064 km) segment of Gothic Lane north from westbound MD 450 to the end of state maintenance. MD 450D was constructed and designated in 2007.
- MD 450E is the designation for Grenville Lane, which runs 0.13 miles (0.21 km) from MD 450B north through an intersection with MD 450 to Gulliver Trail. MD 450E was built and assigned in 2005.
- MD 450F is the designation for the 0.07-mile (0.11 km) section of Church Road south from its intersection with MD 450 and Highbridge Road. MD 450F was built and assigned in 2005.
