= Maryland Route 436 =

State highway in Maryland, United States

Maryland Route 436
- Ridgely Avenue
- Maryland Route 436 highlighted in red

Route information
- Maintained by MDSHA
- Length: 1.14 mi (1.83 km)
- Existed: 1930–present

Major junctions
- South end: MD 435 in Annapolis
- North end: Ridgely Avenue in Parole

Location
- Country: United States
- State: Maryland
- Counties: Anne Arundel

Highway system
- Maryland highway system; Interstate; US; State; Scenic Byways
← MD 435	→ MD 439

Maryland Route 436 (MD 436) is a state highway in the U.S. state of Maryland. Known as Ridgely Avenue, the highway runs 1.14 miles (1.83 km) from MD 435 in Annapolis north to the end of state maintenance in Parole in Anne Arundel County. MD 436 was constructed along part of MD 435 in the late 1920s. MD 436 was moved to its present course in two steps in the mid-1950s and mid-1970s.

== Route description ==
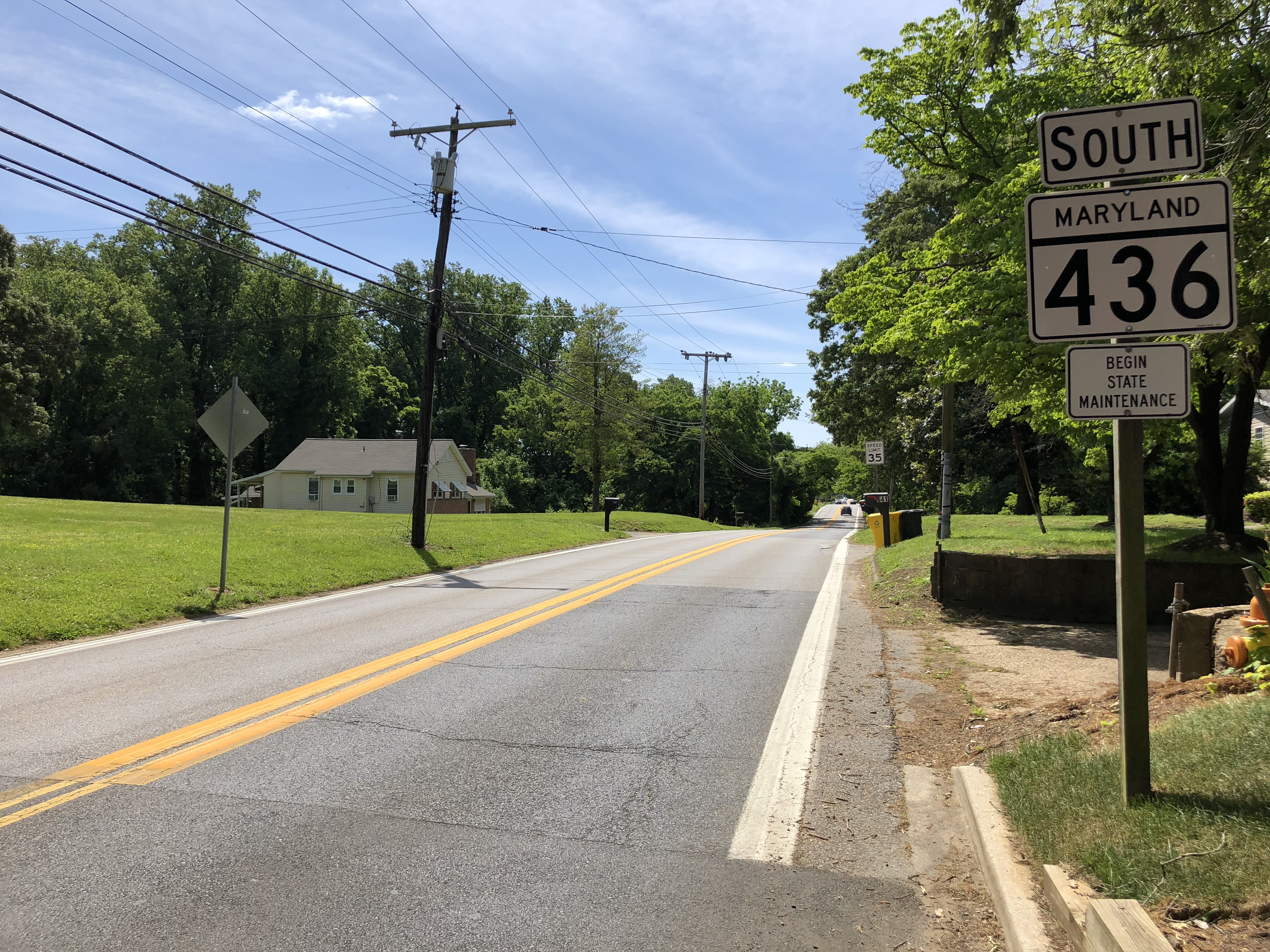
View south at the north end of MD 436 south of Bestgate Road in Parole

MD 436 begins at an intersection with MD 435 (Taylor Avenue) near the campus of the U.S. Naval Academy in Annapolis. The highway heads northwest as a two-lane undivided street through the West Annapolis neighborhood. MD 436 crosses Weems Creek on a drawbridge and leaves the city of Annapolis. The highway crosses over U.S. Route 50 (US 50)/US 301 immediately to the east of the freeway's interchange with MD 70. The bridge over the freeway is between intersections with Riverside Avenue and Acorn Drive, which are unsigned MD 783 and MD 784, respectively. MD 436 reaches its northern terminus just south of Ridgely Avenue's intersection with Bestgate Road and Wilson Road in Parole.

== History ==
Maryland Route 437
- Location: Annapolis
- Existed: 1930–1975

What is now Ridgely Avenue was laid out by West Annapolis developer George T. Melvin in 1889, and a wooden swing bridge across Weems Creek was constructed shortly thereafter.

The Maryland State Roads Commission paved several streets with concrete in West Annapolis in 1929 and 1930; those streets became part of four state highways. MD 436 was constructed along Annapolis Street from Taylor Avenue to MD 2 (now MD 450). MD 436 followed a piece of what is now MD 435; MD 435 originally followed Taylor Avenue north to Annapolis Street, followed Annapolis Street to Severn Avenue (now Melvin Avenue), then followed Severn Avenue to Wardour Drive. The two other state highways in West Annapolis were MD 437, which followed what is now MD 436 along Revell Street (now Ridgely Avenue) from Taylor Avenue to Severn Avenue, and MD 438, which followed Severn Avenue west one block from Annapolis Street then north along what is now MD 436. The wooden bridge across Weems Creek was also replaced with a more modern concrete structure at that time.

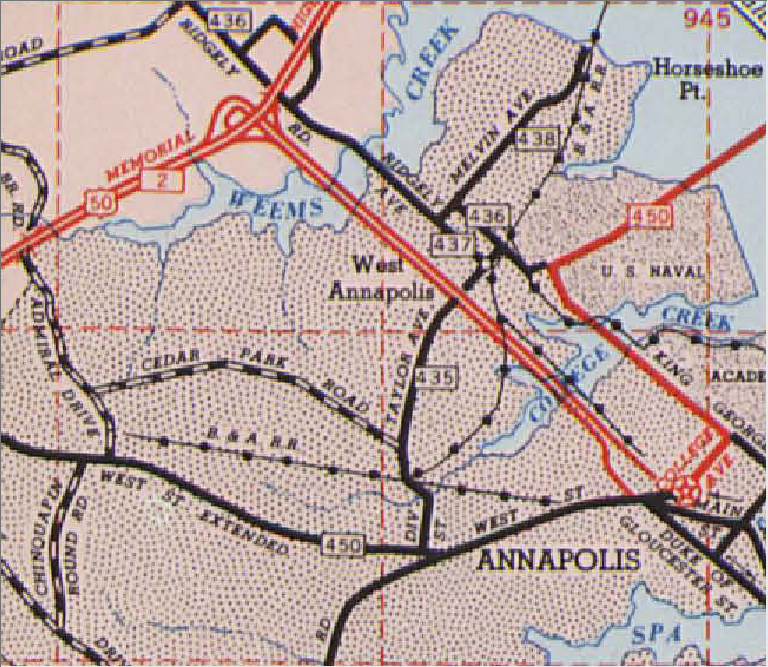
West Annapolis on the 1956 Maryland State highway map.

MD 436 was placed on much of its modern routing in 1954, the same year MD 435 assumed its modern course between intersections with MD 450. MD 436 replaced MD 435 on Annapolis Street from Taylor Avenue to Melvin Avenue and superseded MD 438 west one block along Melvin Avenue and north along Ridgely Avenue to its present terminus. The Melvin Avenue part of MD 435 became MD 438. MD 437 remained along Ridgely Avenue between Taylor Avenue and Melvin Avenue. MD 436 replaced MD 437 on the portion of Ridgely Avenue between MD 435 and Melvin Avenue and MD 437 and MD 438 were removed from the state highway system in 1975.

MD 436's original bridge across US 50 was constructed when the Annapolis Bypass was built between 1952 and 1954. MD 436 had access with the freeway via a pair of right-in/right-out ramps at the end of MD 783 and MD 784 on the eastbound and westbound sides of the freeway, respectively. The right-in/right-out interchanges were removed when US 50 was reconstructed at its MD 70 interchange in 1991; MD 436's modern bridge across US 50 was constructed the same year. The state highway's current swing bridge across Weems Creek was completed in 1997, replacing the structure built in 1929.

== Junction list ==
The entire route is in Anne Arundel County.

Location	mi	km	Destinations	Notes
Annapolis	0.00	0.00	MD 435 (Taylor Avenue)	Southern terminus
Parole	1.14	1.83	Ridgely Avenue north to Bestgate Road west / Wilson Road east	Northern terminus; end of state maintenance
1.000 mi = 1.609 km; 1.000 km = 0.621 mi
