= Maryland Route 435 =

State highway in Maryland, United States

Maryland Route 435
- Maryland Route 435 highlighted in red

Route information
- Maintained by MDSHA and City of Annapolis
- Length: 1.16 mi (1.87 km)
- Existed: 1930–present

Major junctions
- South end: MD 387 / MD 450 in Annapolis
- MD 70 in Annapolis; MD 436 in Annapolis
- North end: MD 450 in Annapolis

Location
- Country: United States
- State: Maryland
- Counties: Anne Arundel

Highway system
- Maryland highway system; Interstate; US; State; Scenic Byways
← MD 433	→ MD 436

Maryland Route 435 (MD 435) is a state highway in the U.S. state of Maryland. The highway runs 1.16 miles (1.87 km) from MD 387 and MD 450 north to MD 450 within Annapolis in Anne Arundel County. MD 435 connects MD 450 with the West Annapolis neighborhood and Navy–Marine Corps Memorial Stadium. The state highway was constructed along most of its current course in the late 1920s. MD 435 and MD 436 switched parts of their routes, with MD 435 attaining its presenting course, in the mid-1950s.

== Route description ==
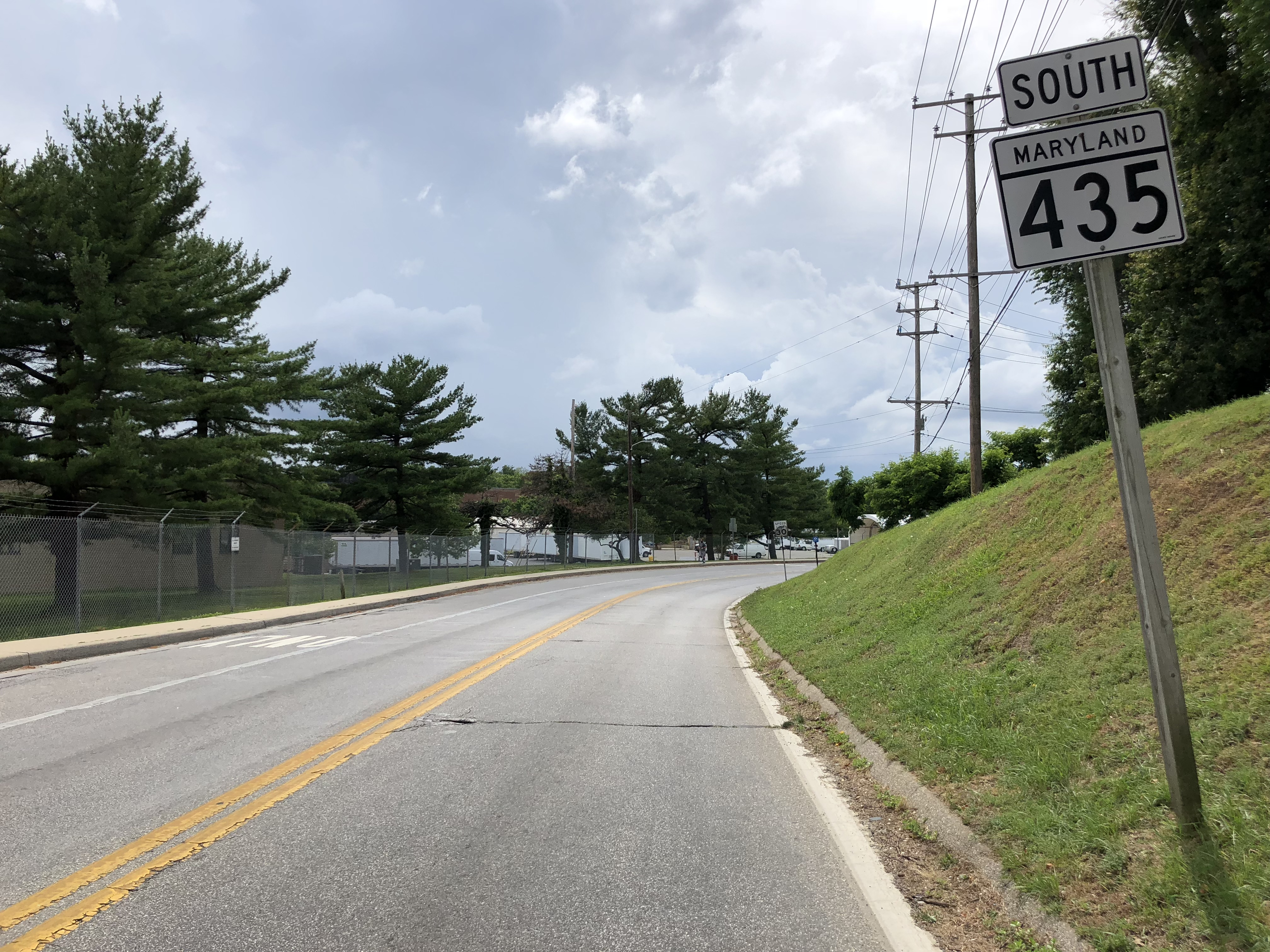
View south at the north end of MD 435 at MD 450 in Annapolis

MD 435 begins at Westgate Circle, a roundabout whose other legs are MD 450 (West Street) and MD 387 (Spa Road). The highway heads north along Taylor Avenue, a two-lane undivided municipally maintained road along the east side of Annapolis National Cemetery. MD 435 passes through an S-curve as it passes the Annapolis Police Department and an old railroad grade. The highway becomes state maintained just south of Rosedale Street. MD 435 curves to the east as it passes along the east side of Navy–Marine Corps Memorial Stadium, the home stadium of the Navy Midshipmen football team. The highway intersects MD 70 (Roscoe Rowe Boulevard) and meets the southern end of MD 436 (Ridgely Avenue) in the West Annapolis neighborhood. MD 435 turns south from Taylor Avenue onto Annapolis Street and enters the campus of the U.S. Naval Academy. The highway curves east again and reaches its eastern terminus at MD 450, which heads east across the Severn River on Baltimore–Annapolis Boulevard and south toward downtown Annapolis on King George Street.

== History ==
The Maryland State Roads Commission paved several streets with concrete in West Annapolis in 1929 and 1930; those streets became part of four state highways. MD 435 was constructed as an 18-foot-wide (5.5 m) road beginning at the Annapolis, Washington and Baltimore Railroad. The state highway followed Taylor Avenue north to Annapolis Street, continued north on Annapolis Street to Severn Avenue (now Melvin Avenue), then followed Severn Avenue to Wardour Drive. The portion of modern MD 435 from Taylor Avenue to MD 2 (now MD 450) was MD 436. The two other state highways in West Annapolis were MD 437, which followed Revell Street (now Ridgely Avenue) from Taylor Avenue to Severn Avenue, and MD 438, which followed Severn Avenue west one block from Annapolis Street then north along what is now MD 436.

MD 435 was extended south along Division Street to West Street, which then carried US 50 and MD 2, by 1946. MD 435 assumed its modern routing between intersections with MD 450 in 1954. The Annapolis Street part of MD 435 became the southernmost part of MD 436. The Melvin Avenue part of MD 435 became MD 438. MD 437 remained along Ridgely Avenue between Taylor Avenue and Melvin Avenue. MD 436 assumed its modern routing and MD 437 and MD 438 were removed from the state highway system in 1975. The portion of MD 435 south of Rosedale Street was transferred from state to municipal maintenance in 1978. The Westgate Circle roundabout was installed in 1999.

== Junction list ==
The entire route is in Annapolis, Anne Arundel County.

mi	km	Destinations	Notes
0.00	0.00	MD 387 south (Spa Road) / MD 450 (West Street) – Parole	Westgate Circle roundabout; southern terminus; northern terminus of MD 387
0.81	1.30	MD 70 (Roscoe Rowe Boulevard) to US 50 – Baltimore, Washington	
0.92	1.48	MD 436 north (Ridgely Avenue)	Southern terminus of MD 436
1.16	1.87	MD 450 (Baltimore–Annapolis Boulevard/King George Street) – Baltimore	Northern terminus
1.000 mi = 1.609 km; 1.000 km = 0.621 mi
