= Maryland Route 197 =

State highway in Maryland, United States

Maryland Route 197
- Maryland Route 197 highlighted in red

Route information
- Maintained by MDSHA
- Length: 14.64 mi (23.56 km)
- Existed: 1927–present

Major junctions
- South end: US 301 in Bowie
- US 50 in Bowie; MD 450 in Bowie; Baltimore–Washington Parkway in South Laurel
- North end: MD 198 in Laurel

Location
- Country: United States
- State: Maryland
- Counties: Prince George's

Highway system
- Maryland highway system; Interstate; US; State; Scenic Byways
← MD 195	→ MD 198

Maryland Route 197 (MD 197) is a state highway in the U.S. state of Maryland. Known for most of its length as Laurel Bowie Road, the state highway runs 14.64 miles (23.56 km) from U.S. Route 301 (US 301) in Bowie north to MD 198 in Laurel. MD 197 serves as the main connection between Bowie and Laurel in northern Prince George's County. The highway also provides access to Patuxent Wildlife Research Center and Bowie State University. MD 197 also connects US 50 in Bowie and the Baltimore–Washington Parkway in South Laurel with the Bowie State MARC station.

MD 197 was constructed from what is now MD 450 in Bowie to US 1 in Laurel between the mid-1920s and early 1930s. The highway was extended south to US 301 in the mid-1950s. MD 197's northern terminus was relocated in the mid-1960s. The portion through Laurel and South Laurel was expanded to a divided highway in the mid-1970s. MD 197 was relocated from its original course through Old Town Bowie to its present course near Bowie State University in the late 1980s; much of this segment was built as divided highway. The highway's southern end was expanded to a divided highway concurrent with the expansion of the US 50 interchange. MD 197's 1950s-era interchange with the Baltimore–Washington Parkway was reconstructed in the early 2000s.

== Route description ==
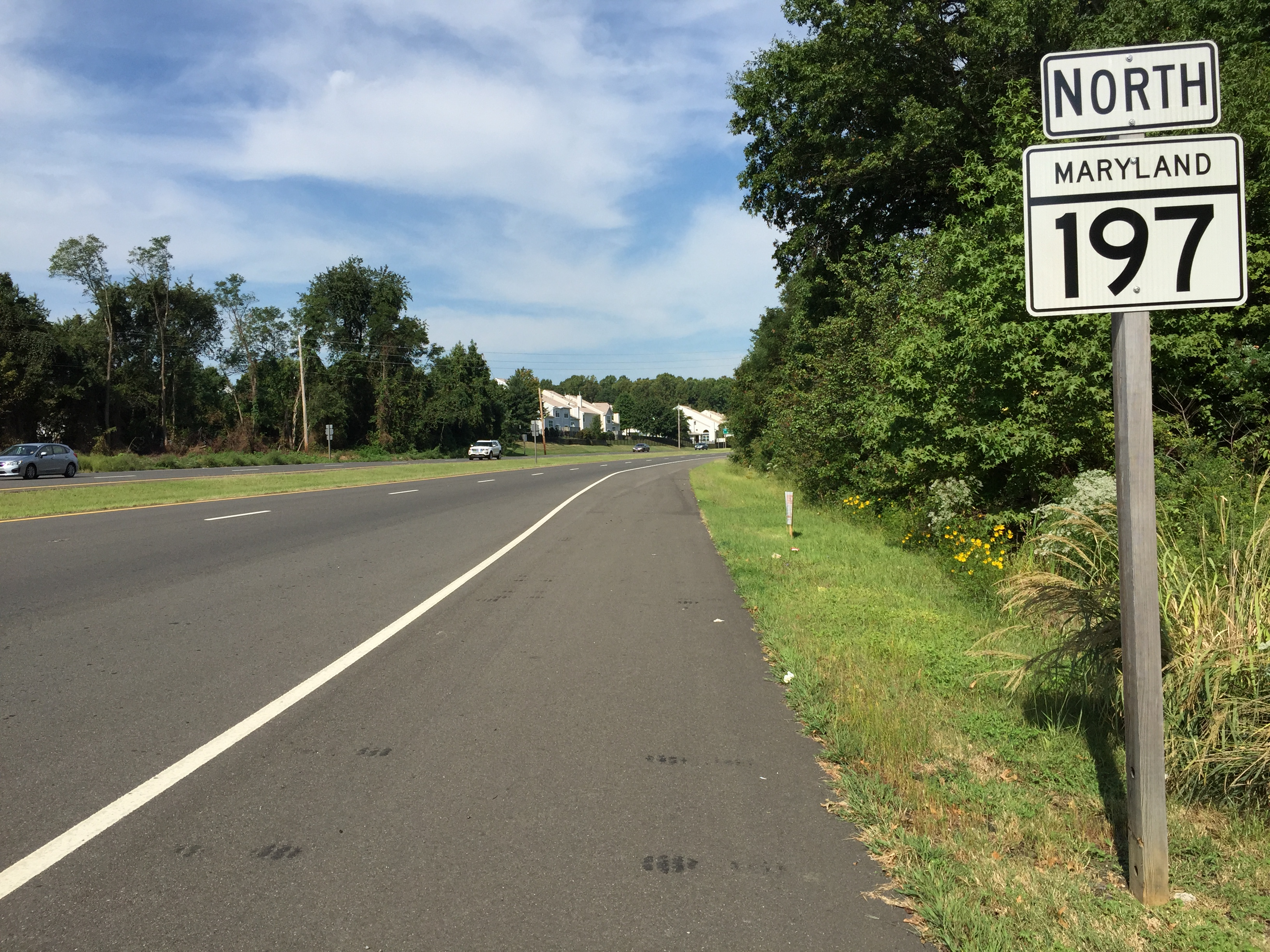
View north at the south end of MD 197 at US 301 in Bowie

MD 197 begins at an intersection with US 301 (Robert Crain Highway) in Bowie. The state highway heads northwest as Collington Road, a four-lane divided highway that expands to six lanes at Mitchellville Road. The highway passes by Bowie Town Center and meets US 50 (John Hanson Highway), which runs concurrently with unsigned Interstate 595, at a partial cloverleaf interchange. Beyond US 50, MD 197 turns north and reduces to a two-lane undivided road. After passing Tulip Grove Drive, which leads to the Belair Mansion and Belair Stable Museum, the highway reaches Old Annapolis Road, which is unsigned MD 450B. MD 197 continues as Laurel Bowie Road and expands to a four-lane divided highway ahead of its intersection with MD 450 (Annapolis Road).

MD 197 continues north as a four-lane road with center turn lane. The route becomes a divided highway just south of its underpass of the Washington, Baltimore and Annapolis Trail and its bridge across Horsepen Branch. MD 197 intersects Race Track Road, named for the defunct Bowie Race Track to the east; Race Track Road leads west to MD 564 and Old Town Bowie. MD 197 turns northwest and passes Jericho Park Road, which is unsigned MD 197C and provides access to Bowie State University and the Bowie State MARC station. After crossing over Amtrak's Northeast Corridor railroad line and MARC's Penn Line and passing the Don S. S. Goodloe House, the state highway reduces to a two-lane undivided road. MD 197 meets the northern end of Old Laurel Bowie Road and enters the Patuxent Wildlife Research Center. The highway passes the entrances to several research facilities of the wildlife refuge as well as the historic home Snowden Hall.

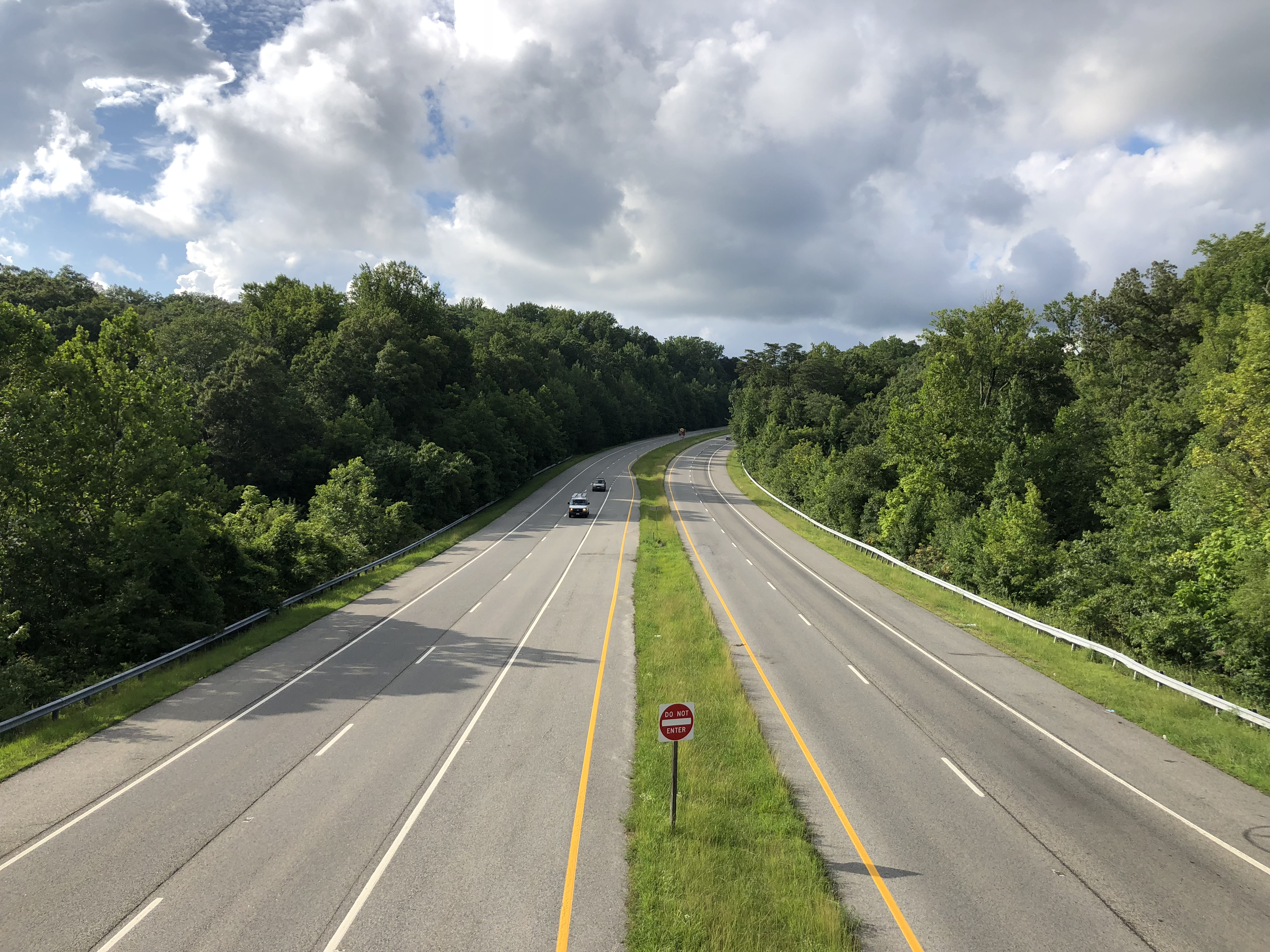
View north along MD 197 from the Washington, Baltimore and Annapolis Trail in Bowie

Northwest of Powder Mill Road, which leads to the Beltsville Agricultural Research Center, MD 197 leaves the wildlife refuge and enters South Laurel. The state highway expands to a four-lane divided highway ahead of its partial cloverleaf interchange with the Baltimore–Washington Parkway. The two directions of MD 197 temporarily split with a wide median through the interchange, which features a flyover ramp from the northbound parkway to northbound MD 197. After the median narrows, the highway expands to three lanes southbound. The state highway meets the eastern end of Muirkirk Road then passes between Patuxent River Park on the east and the grounds of Montpelier Mansion on the west. The highway intersects Contee Road and passes the historic estate Snow Hill. MD 197 crosses Crow Branch and gains a third lane northbound just south of its junction with Cherry Lane. As the state highway bears to the northeast, Bowie Road splits to the north and the southbound direction drops to two lanes. MD 197 crosses Bear Branch and enters the city limits of Laurel before it reaches its northern terminus at MD 198 (Fort Meade Road).

MD 197 is a part of the National Highway System as a principal arterial for its entire length. The highway is an intermodal connector between US 50 and the Baltimore–Washington Parkway. The remaining portions of MD 197 south of US 50 and north of the parkway are National Highway System principal arterials.

== History ==
MD 197 was built as a gravel road starting in 1925 from Muirkirk Road, which originally intersected the highway south of the modern Baltimore–Washington Parkway interchange. The highway was completed north to Contee Road in 1927 and to US 1 in Laurel, using Bowie Road, in 1928. The highway was extended south from Muirkirk Road approximately 2 miles (3.2 km) in 1929. A separate segment of MD 197 was built from US 50 (now MD 450) north to the Pennsylvania Railroad (now Amtrak's Northeast Corridor) in the old center of Bowie in 1929 and 1930. This segment included what is now the easternmost portion of MD 564 along Laurel Bowie Road and 11th Street. The gap between the two segments, which followed Chestnut Street and Old Laurel Bowie Road north from Old Town Bowie, was started in 1930 and completed in 1933. MD 197 was extended south to US 301 along Collington Road, including a bridge across under-construction John Hanson Highway, in 1955.

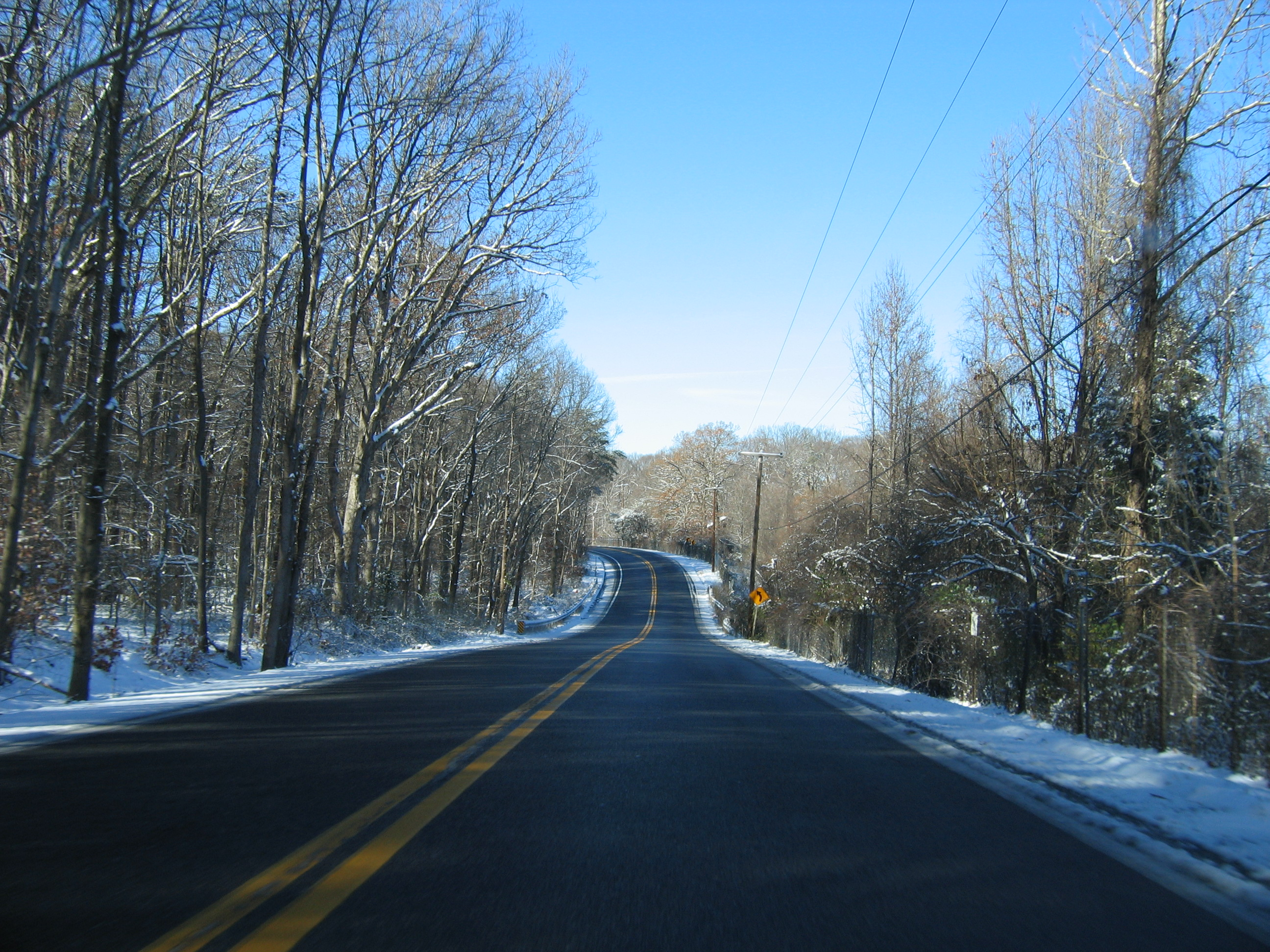
MD 197 within the Patuxent Wildlife Research Center

MD 197 was relocated to its present northern terminus at MD 198 in 1966; Bowie Road was transferred to county and city maintenance. The route was expanded to a divided highway from the parkway to MD 198 between 1976 and 1978. MD 197's modern bridge across the Amtrak Northeast Corridor was built in 1981. By 1983, a short segment of state-maintained divided highway connected the bridge to Jericho Park Road on either side of the railroad, including the main entrance to Bowie State University. The divided highway south of Bowie State University was under construction in 1989 and completed by 1991. In 1991, the divided highway was connected with Laurel Bowie Road north of Old Town Bowie; MD 197 was assigned to the new highway and removed from Old Town Bowie; MD 564 was extended east to its present terminus along old MD 197. MD 197 was expanded to a divided highway from US 301 to north of US 50 in 1991. The Maryland State Highway Administration has long-term plans to expand the 1.4-mile (2.3 km) two-lane portion of the highway between US 50 and MD 450 to a four-lane divided highway.

Both of MD 197's freeway interchanges have evolved since they were constructed in the 1950s and 1960s. The highway's original interchange with US 50, a four-ramp partial cloverleaf with a loop from eastbound US 50, was completed in 1965. A ramp was added from eastbound US 50 to southbound MD 197 in 1977. The interchange was rebuilt as the present six-ramp partial cloverleaf in 1990 and 1991 in conjunction with the expansion of both highways in Bowie. MD 197's original interchange with the Baltimore–Washington Parkway, which opened in 1954, was a diamond interchange in which the ramp from MD 197 to the southbound parkway served as the eastern terminus of Muirkirk Road. Muirkirk Road was relocated to its present terminus north of the parkway in 1993. MD 197's present interchange with the Baltimore–Washington Parkway, including the new southbound lanes of MD 197 and the flyover ramp from the northbound parkway to northbound MD 197, was constructed in 2001 and 2002.

== Junction list ==
The entire route is in Prince George's County.

Location	mi	km	Destinations	Notes
Bowie	0.00	0.00	US 301 (Robert Crain Highway) – Upper Marlboro, Baltimore	Southern terminus
Bowie	1.65	2.66	US 50 (John Hanson Highway) – Annapolis, Washington	US 50 Exit 11; US 50 runs concurrently with unsigned I-595
Bowie	3.28	5.28	MD 450 (Annapolis Road) – Lanham, Crofton	
Bowie	5.76	9.27	Race Track Road to MD 564 west – Lanham	
Bowie	6.21	9.99	Jericho Park Road – Bowie State University	Unsigned MD 197C
South Laurel	11.70	18.83	Baltimore–Washington Parkway (MD 295) – Baltimore, Washington	Partial cloverleaf interchange with flyover from northbound parkway to northbound MD 197
Laurel	14.64	23.56	MD 198 (Fort Meade Road) – Burtonsville, Fort Meade	Northern terminus
1.000 mi = 1.609 km; 1.000 km = 0.621 mi

== Auxiliary routes ==
MD 197 has two extant auxiliary routes and at least two former ones.

- MD 197B was the designation for Old Collington Road, which ran for 0.64 miles (1.03 km) from Holiday Lane north to a dead end beyond Northview Drive. The road now serves the community of Heather Hills and the Pin Oak townhouse development in Bowie, having been bypassed when MD 197 was moved to its current six-lane location between US 50 and US 301. MD 197B was transferred from state maintenance to the city of Bowie in 1997.
- MD 197C is the designation for Jericho Park Road, a 0.09-mile (0.14 km) four-lane divided highway connector between MD 197 and county-maintained Jericho Park Road on the north side of Bowie. MD 197C serves as the main entrance to Bowie State University and also leads to the Bowie State MARC station. The auxiliary route was built around 1983 when the first portion of the MD 197 bypass of Old Town Bowie was built.
- MD 197D is the designation for Steven F. Gaughan Drive, a 0.13-mile (0.21 km) service road that runs from South Laurel Drive to a dead end adjacent to the south side of MD 197's interchange with the Baltimore–Washington Parkway in South Laurel. The highway was built in 2002 by the National Park Service and transferred to Maryland State Highway Administration maintenance. Originally named Service Road, the route was renamed for fallen police officer Steven F. Gaughan in 2006.
- MD 197E was the designation for Gallant Fox Access Road, a 0.16-mile (0.26 km) service road that connected Gallant Fox Lane with Old Annapolis Road in Bowie. MD 197E was created in 2004 and transferred to the city of Bowie in 2008.
