= Maryland Route 564 =

State highway in Prince George's County, Maryland, US

Maryland Route 564
- Maryland Route 564 highlighted in red

Route information
- Maintained by MDSHA
- Length: 6.73 mi (10.83 km)
- Existed: 1933–present

Major junctions
- West end: MD 450 in Lanham
- MD 193 in Glenn Dale
- East end: Road end in Bowie

Location
- Country: United States
- State: Maryland
- Counties: Prince George's

Highway system
- Maryland highway system; Interstate; US; State; Scenic Byways
← MD 562	→ MD 565

Maryland Route 564 (MD 564) is a state highway in the U.S. state of Maryland. Known for most of its length as Lanham Severn Road, the state highway runs 6.73 miles (10.83 km) from MD 450 in Lanham east to a dead end near a connection to MD 197 in Bowie. MD 564 was constructed from Lanham to Old Town Bowie in the mid-1930s. In the early 1990s, the highway was extended east over part of MD 197 when that highway was relocated through Bowie.

== Route description ==
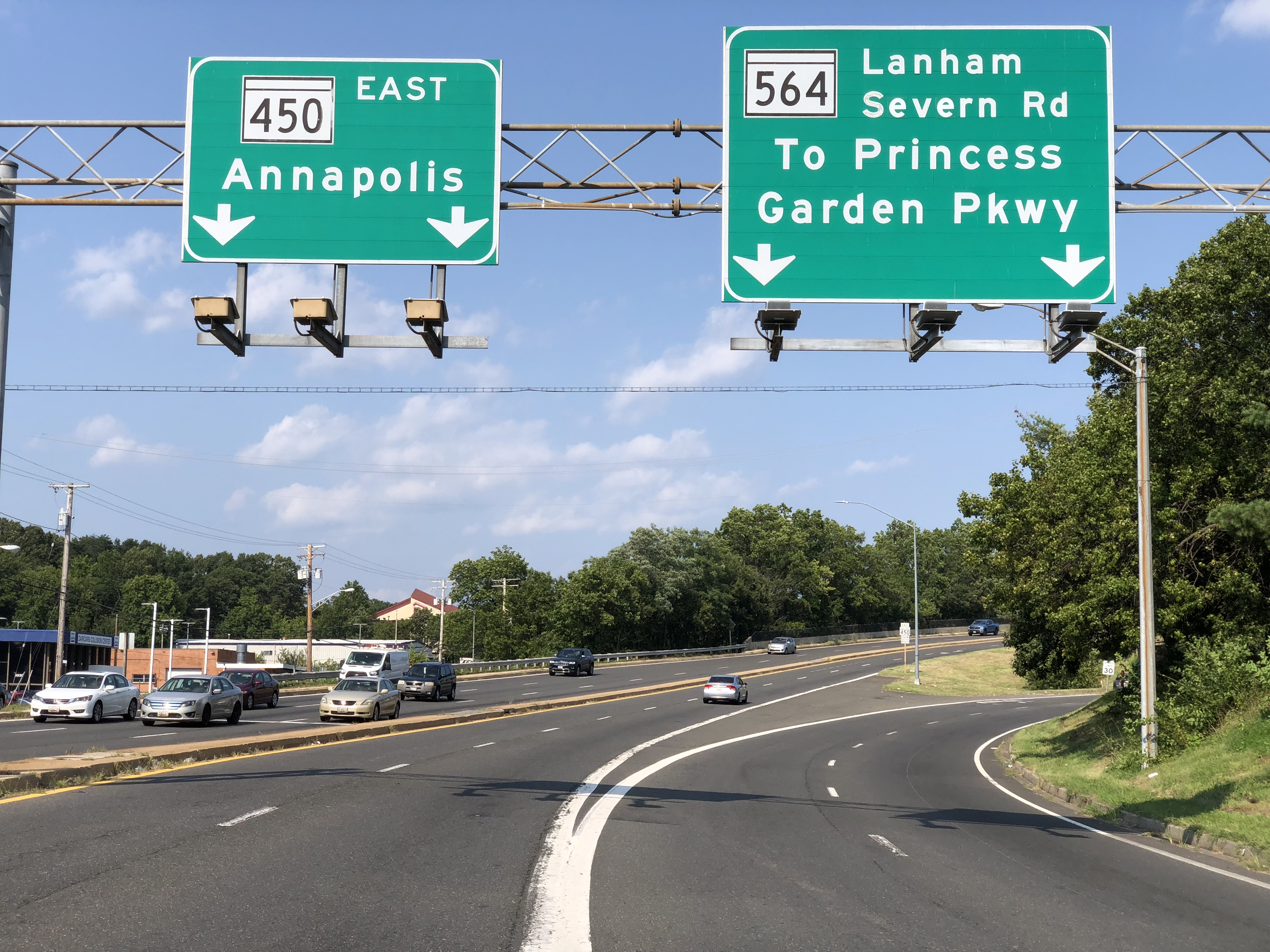
View east at the west end of MD 564 at MD 450 in Lanham

MD 564 begins at a partial interchange with MD 450 (Annapolis Road) in Lanham. There is no access from westbound MD 450 to eastbound MD 564 or from westbound MD 564 to eastbound MD 450. Eastbound MD 564 exits from eastbound MD 450, passes under MD 450, and meets westbound MD 564 at an intersection where heading straight leads to Cipriano Road. The two directions of MD 564 come together as Lanham Severn Road, a two-lane undivided road heading northeast paralleling Amtrak's Northeast Corridor railroad line and MARC's Penn Line at a distance. The state highway crosses Baldhill Branch and passes through the unincorporated community of Seabrook, where the road intersects Seabrook Road and passes the Seabrook station serving MARC trains. After passing through a commercial area in Seabrook, MD 564 passes several industrial properties on the railroad side of the highway. The state highway enters Glenn Dale, where the highway temporarily expands to a four-lane divided highway for intersections with Glenn Dale Road (unsigned MD 953A) and MD 193 (Glenn Dale Boulevard).

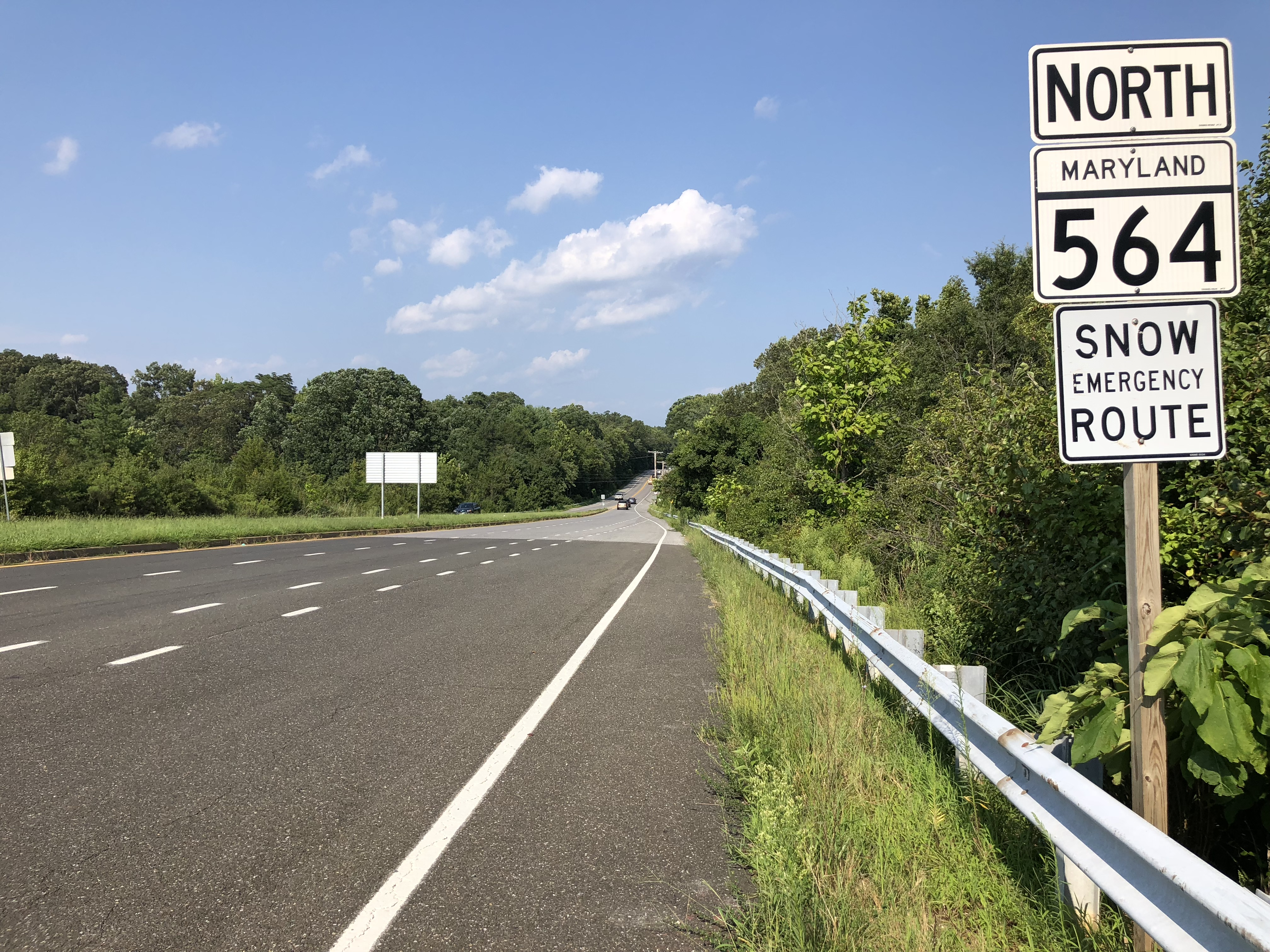
MD 564 northbound past MD 193 in Glenn Dale

MD 564 continues northeast, passing Hillmeade Road and Springfield Road before entering the Old Town Bowie section of the city of Bowie, where the highway's name changes to 9th Street. At Chestnut Avenue, which is unsigned MD 564A, the state highway assumes that street's name and turns south to cross the Amtrak Northeast Corridor just north of its junction with CSX's Popes Creek Subdivision railroad line. MD 564 turns east onto 11th Street, which heads west toward the railroad wye as unsigned MD 564C. After passing Race Track Road, which heads east toward an intersection with MD 197 (Laurel–Bowie Road), MD 564 curves south and reaches its southern terminus at the entrance to a farm adjacent to the Washington, Baltimore and Annapolis Trail's crossing of MD 197.

== History ==
MD 564 was constructed as a concrete road from U.S. Route 50 (now MD 450) in Lanham to Seabrook Road in Seabrook starting in 1933. The remainder of the highway was built as a gravel road from Seabrook to its original eastern terminus at MD 197 (now Chestnut Street) in Bowie in 1934. Both segments that parallel what was then the Pennsylvania Railroad were completed in 1934. The portion of MD 564 east of Chestnut Street was built as part of MD 197 in 1929 and 1930. MD 564 was widened to 22 feet (6.7 m) along its entire length between 1949 and 1952. The route was expanded to a divided highway on either side of the MD 193 intersection in 1985 when Glenn Dale Boulevard was completed across the Amtrak Northeast Corridor. MD 564's partial interchange with MD 450 was built shortly after the latter highway's bridge across the railroad tracks was replaced in 1989. MD 564 was extended east to its present terminus when MD 197 was removed from Old Town Bowie to its present course to the east in 1991. Chestnut Street originally crossed the railroad north–south in line with the street grid of Old Town Bowie. MD 564's modern bridge across the Amtrak Northeast Corridor, which is perpendicular to the railroad, was completed in 1994.

== Junction list ==
The entire route is in Prince George's County.

Location	mi	km	Destinations	Notes
Lanham	0.00	0.00	MD 450 west (Annapolis Road) – Bladensburg	Western terminus; partial interchange with no access from westbound MD 450 to eastbound MD 564 or from westbound MD 564 to eastbound MD 450
Lanham	0.31	0.50	Cipriano Road north to MD 450 west / Princess Garden Parkway – Greenbelt	Intersection includes U-turn from eastbound MD 564 to westbound MD 564
Glenn Dale	3.04	4.89	MD 193 (Glenn Dale Boulevard) – Greenbelt, Kettering	
Bowie	6.35	10.22	Race Track Road east to MD 197 – Laurel	
Bowie	6.73	10.83	Road end	Eastern terminus
1.000 mi = 1.609 km; 1.000 km = 0.621 mi: Incomplete access

== Auxiliary routes ==
MD 564 has three unsigned auxiliary routes in Bowie.

- MD 564A is the designation for a 0.06-mile (0.097 km) section of Chestnut Avenue that connects MD 564 to the county-maintained portion of the street on the north side of the Amtrak Northeast Corridor.
- MD 564B is the designation for Chestnut Street, a 0.04-mile (0.064 km) section of old alignment of MD 197 from MD 564C north to a dead end adjacent to the Huntington Railroad Museum on the south side of the Amtrak Northeast Corridor.
- MD 564C is the designation for a 0.02-mile (0.032 km) section of 11th Street that connects the county-maintained portion of Chestnut Avenue with MD 564 on the south side of the Amtrak Northeast Corridor.
