= Maryland Route 433 =

State highway in Maryland, United States

Maryland Route 433
- MD 433 highlighted in red

Route information
- Maintained by MDSHA
- Length: 1.29 mi (2.08 km)
- Existed: 2019–present

Major junctions
- South end: MD 410 in New Carrollton
- North end: MD 450 in New Carrollton

Location
- Country: United States
- State: Maryland
- Counties: Prince George's

Highway system
- Maryland highway system; Interstate; US; State; Scenic Byways
← MD 432	→ MD 435

Maryland Route 433 (MD 433) is an unsigned state highway in the U.S. state of Maryland, located in Prince George's County to the northeast of Washington, D.C. The route runs 1.29 miles (2.08 km) from MD 410 northeast to MD 450 in New Carrollton. What is now MD 433 was transferred to the state in 2017 as MD 594F and was renumbered to MD 433 in 2019.

== Route description ==
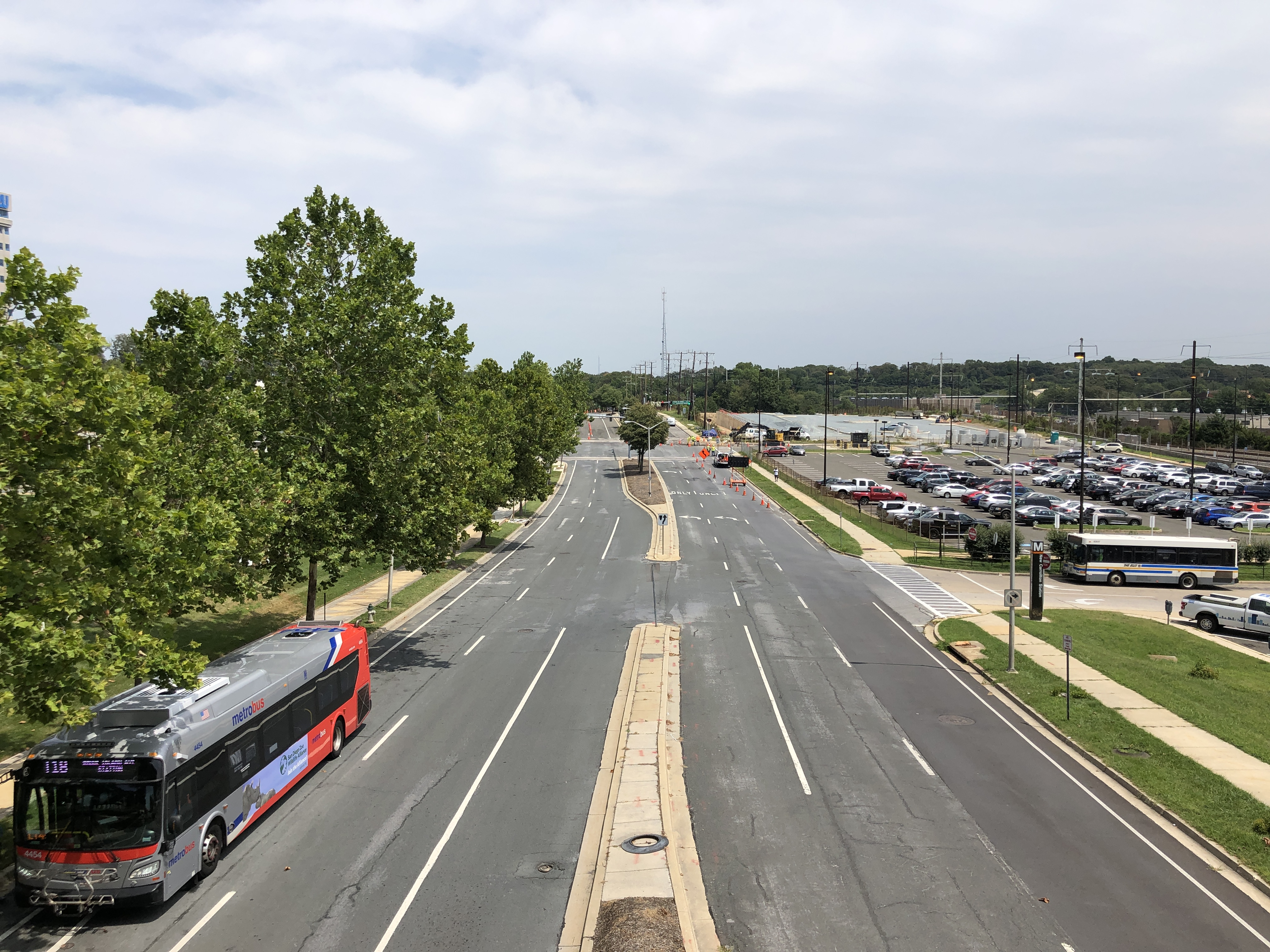
MD 433 northbound at the New Carrollton station

MD 433 begins at an intersection with MD 410 (Veterans Parkway) in New Carrollton in Prince George's County, heading east on four-lane undivided Ellin Road and immediately leaving the city limits. The route passes through wooded residential areas, curving southeast and then northeast as it becomes a divided highway. The road heads into business parks as it passes northwest of the New Carrollton station that serves Amtrak's Northeast Corridor railroad line, MARC's Penn Line, and the terminus of Washington Metro's Orange Line. MD 433 comes to an intersection with Harkins Road, at which point the road name changes to 85th Avenue. The route narrows to a two-lane undivided road and continues north back into New Carrollton, heading past apartment complexes. MD 433 runs past businesses before it comes to its terminus at an intersection with MD 450 (Annapolis Road), where 85th Avenue continues north as a municipal road.

== History ==
What is now MD 433 was transferred from Prince George's County to the state as MD 594F in an agreement dated May 11, 2017. On August 27, 2019, MD 594F was renumbered to MD 433 per the request of Maryland State Highway Administration District 3.

== Junction list ==
The entire route is in New Carrollton, Prince George's County.

mi	km	Destinations	Notes
0.00	0.00	MD 410 (Veterans Parkway)	Southern terminus
1.29	2.08	MD 450 (Annapolis Road) / 85th Avenue north	Northern terminus
1.000 mi = 1.609 km; 1.000 km = 0.621 mi
