= Maryland Route 953 =

State highway in Maryland, United States

Maryland Route 953
- Glenn Dale Road

Route information
- Maintained by MDSHA
- Length: 3.53 mi (5.68 km)
- Existed: 1985–present

Major junctions
- South end: MD 193 in Glenn Dale
- MD 450 in Glenn Dale
- North end: Dead end at Amtrak's Northeast Corridor in Glenn Dale

Location
- Country: United States
- State: Maryland
- Counties: Prince George's

Highway system
- Maryland highway system; Interstate; US; State; Scenic Byways
← MD 952	→ MD 954

Maryland Route 953 (MD 953) is a state highway in the U.S. state of Maryland. Known as Glenn Dale Road, the state highway runs 3.53 miles (5.68 km) from MD 193 north to a dead end at Amtrak's Northeast Corridor railroad line within Glenn Dale. MD 953 is the old alignment of MD 193, part of which was originally MD 199. MD 199 was a short route constructed north from what is now MD 450 in the mid-1920s and removed from the state highway system in the mid-1950s. MD 193 was extended east and south from Greenbelt over the length of Glenn Dale Road to just north of U.S. Route 50 (US 50) in the mid-1960s. After MD 193 was placed on a new divided highway through Glenn Dale in the mid-1980s, MD 953 was assigned to Glenn Dale Road.

== Route description ==
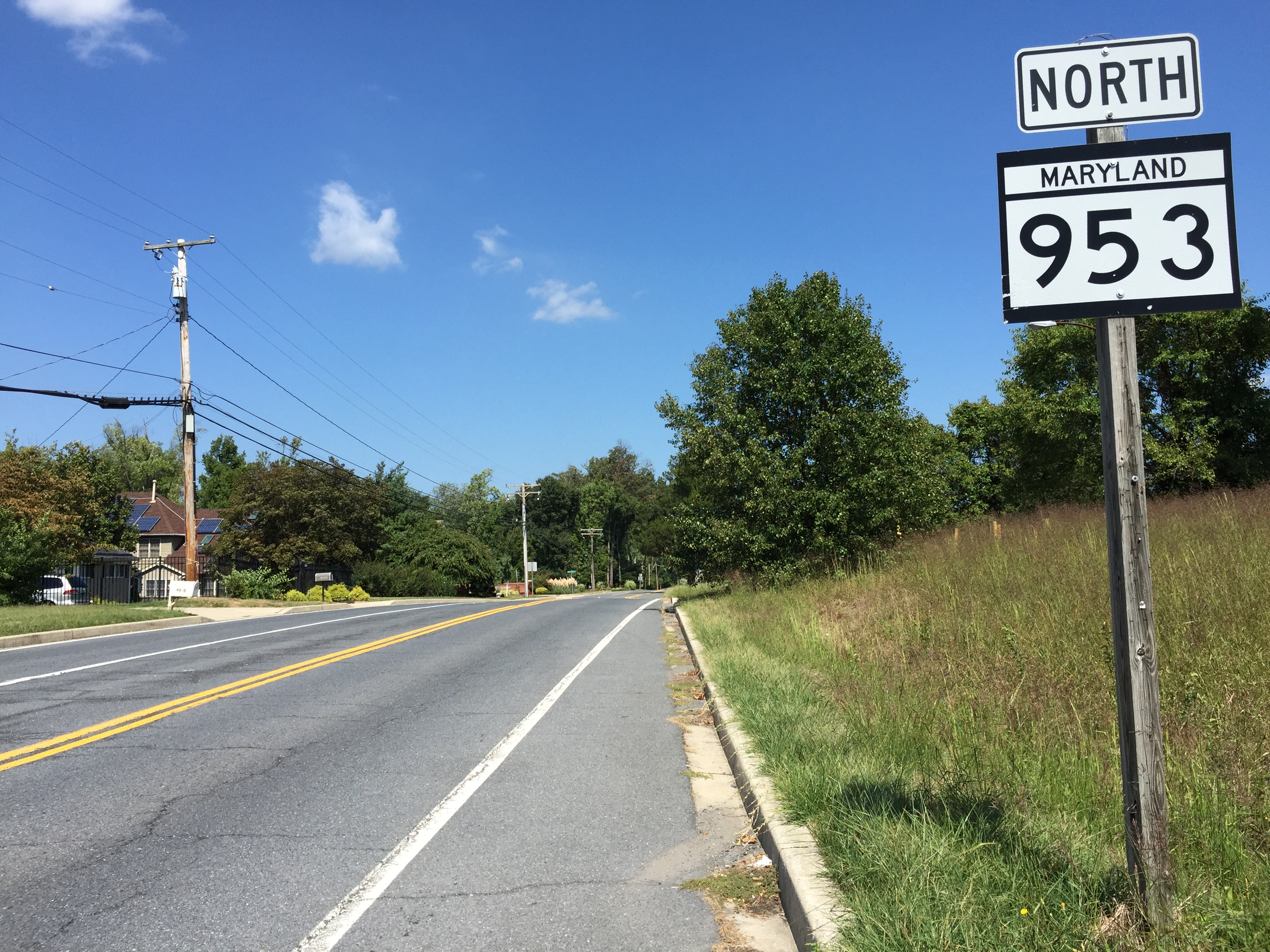
View north along MD 953 at MD 450 in Glenn Dale

MD 953 begins at an intersection with MD 193 (Enterprise Road) a short distance north of MD 193's underpass of US 50 (John Hanson Highway). The two-lane undivided state highway heads west, passes through a gentle S-curve to the south, then crosses Lottsford Branch and veers north. MD 953 temporarily gains an extra lane in both directions between Atwell Avenue and the intersection with MD 450 (Annapolis Road). The state highway continues north across the remains of the Glenn Dale Hospital and intersects the Washington, Baltimore and Annapolis Trail. Shortly after passing Daisy Lane and Prospect Hill Road, which connects MD 953 with MD 193 (Glenn Dale Boulevard), MD 953 reaches its northern terminus at a dead end adjacent to Amtrak's Northeast Corridor railroad line.

== History ==
Maryland Route 199
- Location: Glenn Dale
- Existed: 1927–1954

MD 199 was constructed as a gravel road along what was then known as Randle Station Road from US 50 (now MD 450) north to the Washington, Baltimore and Annapolis Electric Railway (now the namesake trail) in 1925 and 1926. The MD 199 designation was removed from that road in 1954. That same year, construction began on modern US 50 (John Hanson Highway) at the southern end of Glenn Dale Road. Glenn Dale Road had previously continued southeast from its bridge across Lottsford Branch and followed what is now Belvidere Road south of US 50 to its southern end at MD 556 (now MD 193). After the US 50 freeway was constructed, Glenn Dale Road was relocated to head due east from Lottsford Branch to MD 556. In 1965, MD 193 was extended east from the Baltimore–Washington Parkway in Greenbelt to the Glenn Dale level crossing of the Pennsylvania Railroad (now Amtrak's Northeast Corridor), then south along Glenn Dale Road to MD 556 just north of US 50. The current curve just west of MD 953's southern terminus was added in 1983, replacing the piece of Glenn Dale Road that continues straight east but dead ends before MD 193. Two years later, MD 193 was moved to the new Glenn Dale Boulevard and replaced MD 556 south to MD 214. Old MD 193 remained a state highway but was split by the closing of the Glenn Dale railroad crossing in favor of MD 193's bridge over the railroad on its new alignment. Glenn Dale Road was designated MD 953 by 1993.

== Junction list ==
The entire route is in Glenn Dale, Prince George's County.

mi	km	Destinations	Notes
0.00	0.00	MD 193 (Enterprise Road) – Greenbelt, Kettering	Southern terminus
1.32	2.12	MD 450 (Annapolis Road) – Lanham, Bowie	
3.53	5.68	Dead end at Amtrak's Northeast Corridor	Northern terminus
1.000 mi = 1.609 km; 1.000 km = 0.621 mi

== Auxiliary route ==
MD 953A is the unsigned designation for Glenn Dale Road, a 0.13-mile (0.21 km) section of old alignment of MD 193 that runs between two dead ends on the north side of Amtrak's Northeast Corridor. MD 953A has an intersection with MD 564 (Lanham Severn Road) and provides access to the Glenn Dale post office.
