= Seabrook, Maryland =

- Census-designated place
- Location within the state of Maryland Seabrook, Maryland (the United States)
- Coordinates: 38°58′04″N 76°50′42″W
- Country: United States
- State: Maryland
- County: Prince George's

Area
  - Total: 3.08 sq mi (7.97 km^{2})
  - Land: 3.08 sq mi (7.97 km^{2})
  - Water: 0 sq mi (0.00 km^{2})

Population (2020)
  - Total: 19,627
  - Density: 6,378.2/sq mi (2,462.65/km^{2})
- Time zone: UTC−5 (Eastern (EST))
  - Summer (DST): UTC−4 (EDT)
- FIPS code: 24-70775
- GNIS feature ID: 598065

Seabrook is an unincorporated community and census-designated place (CDP) in Prince George's County, Maryland, United States, located approximately 12 miles (19 km) east of Washington, D.C. Per the 2020 census, the population was 19,627. Prior to 2010, Seabrook was part of the Lanham-Seabrook census-designated place.

== Etymology ==
Seabrook takes its name from Thomas Seabrook, who was a topographical engineer with the Pennsylvania Railroad. He originally built three cottages and a park with fenced-in tame deer in the area near the rail station in the early 1870s.

== History ==
A school was built in Seabrook in 1895.

The community developed in direct relationship with the Washington Branch of the Baltimore and Potomac Railroad. The railroad's main branch into Washington opened in July 1872, with stations established at Glenn Dale, Seabrook, and Lanham, among others. Thomas Seabrook, an engineer for the railroad, purchased 500 acres (2.0 km^{2}) of land in 1871 around the location of a planned station for the purpose of creating a retreat community, and later that year the railroad chose to call the station "Seabrook's". By 1880, a station building and three Gothic cottages had been built, followed by commercial buildings and a schoolhouse. By 1914, the community remained small with just a few buildings located at the intersection of Seabrook Road with the railroad. By 1957, the community had grown to include approximately 185 houses along 10 streets. The streets were arranged in a grid pattern roughly parallel to the railroad line. The community extended from present-day Good Luck Road south to Annapolis Road.

Residential development continued on vacant lots within the community throughout the 20th century, while commercial development focused along the main roads. Commercial strip development is located along Annapolis Road and Lanham-Severn Road. The original railroad station and early commercial buildings are no longer extant, though the old schoolhouse and a few of the early dwellings survive.

Most of the more recently built Seabrook (some of which was originally called Seabrook Acres) is a development of red brick homes along the Lanham-Severn Road, now Maryland Route 564 in Maryland, approximately one half mile east of the Capital Beltway. Many of its homes were built in the 1950s to serve the needs of new employees at the newly established NASA Goddard Space Flight Center, which is located immediately to the north. Development of apartment complexes and other large structures has occurred during recent years of developer expansion. However, Seabrook remains a residential area with numerous single homes surrounded by green lawns shaded by century-old oak trees.

== Geography ==
According to the U.S. Census Bureau, the Seabrook census-designated place has a total area of 3.0 square miles (7.8 km^{2}), all land.

== Demographics ==
Historical population
Census	Pop.	Note	%±
2010	17,287		—
2020	19,627		13.5%
U.S. Decennial Census; 2010 2020

Seabrook first appeared as a census designated place in the 2010 U.S. census formed from all of the deleted Goddard CDP, part of the deleted Lanham-Seabrook CDP, and part of the Glenn Dale CDP.

=== Racial and ethnic composition ===
Seabrook CDP, Maryland – Racial and ethnic composition Note: the US Census treats Hispanic/Latino as an ethnic category. This table excludes Latinos from the racial categories and assigns them to a separate category. Hispanics/Latinos may be of any race.
Race / Ethnicity (NH = Non-Hispanic)	Pop 2010	Pop 2020	% 2010	% 2020
White alone (NH)	2,098	1,501	12.14%	7.65%
Black or African American alone (NH)	11,175	11,862	64.64%	60.44%
Native American or Alaska Native alone (NH)	22	18	0.13%	0.09%
Asian alone (NH)	1,024	1,280	5.92%	6.52%
Native Hawaiian or Pacific Islander alone (NH)	12	3	0.07%	0.02%
Other race alone (NH)	46	87	0.27%	0.44%
Mixed race or Multiracial (NH)	373	585	2.16%	2.98%
Hispanic or Latino (any race)	2,537	4,291	14.68%	21.86%
Total	17,827	19,627	100.00%	100.00%

=== 2020 census ===
As of the 2020 census, Seabrook had a population of 19,627. The median age was 35.7 years. 25.1% of residents were under the age of 18 and 12.7% of residents were 65 years of age or older. For every 100 females there were 91.5 males, and for every 100 females age 18 and over there were 88.3 males age 18 and over.

100.0% of residents lived in urban areas, while 0.0% lived in rural areas.

There were 6,105 households in Seabrook, of which 40.3% had children under the age of 18 living in them. Of all households, 41.2% were married-couple households, 18.1% were households with a male householder and no spouse or partner present, and 35.3% were households with a female householder and no spouse or partner present. About 21.4% of all households were made up of individuals and 7.5% had someone living alone who was 65 years of age or older.

There were 6,339 housing units, of which 3.7% were vacant. The homeowner vacancy rate was 1.2% and the rental vacancy rate was 4.7%.

Racial composition as of the 2020 census
Race	Number	Percent
White	1,757	9.0%
Black or African American	12,008	61.2%
American Indian and Alaska Native	225	1.1%
Asian	1,286	6.6%
Native Hawaiian and Other Pacific Islander	6	0.0%
Some other race	3,005	15.3%
Two or more races	1,340	6.8%

== Businesses ==
Seabrook has its own MARC commuter rail station (Seabrook Station). Seabrook residents are served by a large number of small businesses, including restaurants, fast foot eateries, banks, lawyer services, laundry services, veterinary services, car repair, and numerous other businesses which are located at the Seabrook Station. Seabrook shoppers also tend to shop at the supermarkets and stores at Glenn Dale, slightly to the east on Route 564, or drive east approximately 5 miles (8.0 km) to Bowie, with its large shopping complexes such as the Bowie Town Center.

== Lanham-Seabrook ==
Lanham, Maryland, an older community, lies to the west on both sides of the Washington Beltway. Within the Lanham-Seabrook area, there is only one post office (20706), located a half mile east of Seabrook Station on route 564, which both towns must share. As a result, since the post office has been designated "Lanham", all mail to both the Seabrook and Lanham area is town-designated as "Lanham" or "Lanham-Seabrook".

== Government ==
Prince George's County Police Department District 2 Station in Brock Hall CDP, with a Bowie postal address, serves the community.

The U.S. Postal Service operates the Lanham Seabrook Post Office in Lanham CDP.

== Education ==
Prince George's County Public Schools serves Seabrook.

Zoned elementary schools serving the CDP include Robert Frost, Gaywood, Magnolia, and Catherine T. Reed.

Thomas Johnson Middle School serves most of Seabrook CDP while Greenbelt Middle School serves a portion.

DuVal High School serves most of Seabrook CDP while Eleanor Roosevelt High School serves a portion.

== Notable people ==
- Rodney McGruder, NBA player
- Quinn Ojinnaka, professional wrestler and former American football player
