= Maryland Route 70 =

State highway in Anne Arundel County, Maryland, US

Maryland Route 70
- Maryland Route 70 highlighted in red

Route information
- Maintained by MDSHA
- Length: 2.31 mi (3.72 km)
- Existed: 1954–present

Major junctions
- South end: MD 450 in Annapolis
- MD 435 in Annapolis; I-595 / US 50 / US 301 / MD 2 in Parole
- North end: Bestgate Road in Parole

Location
- Country: United States
- State: Maryland
- Counties: Anne Arundel

Highway system
- Maryland highway system; Interstate; US; State; Scenic Byways
← I-70	→ MD 75

Maryland Route 70 (MD 70) is a state highway in the U.S. state of Maryland. Known for most of its length as Roscoe Rowe Boulevard, the highway runs 2.31 miles (3.72 km) from MD 450 in Annapolis north to Bestgate Road in Parole in Anne Arundel County. MD 70 is the primary highway connecting U.S. Route 50 (US 50) and US 301 with downtown Annapolis. The highway also serves several sets of Maryland state government offices and Navy–Marine Corps Memorial Stadium. MD 70 was constructed in the mid-1950s contemporaneously with the US 50 freeway. The highway was extended north to Bestgate Road in the early 1990s.

== Route description ==
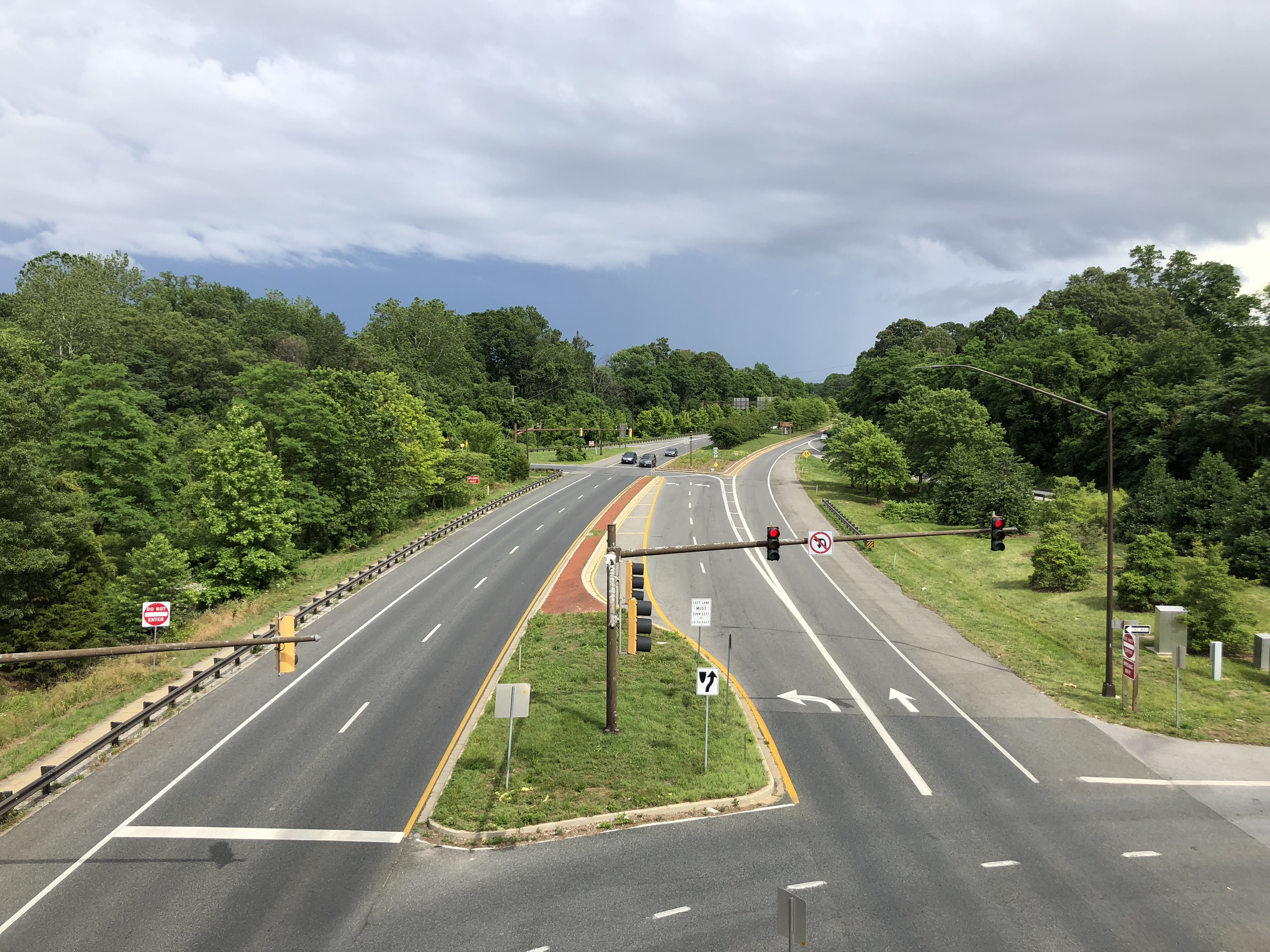
View south along MD 70 from I-595/US 50/US 301/MD 2 in Parole

MD 70 begins at an intersection with MD 450 (College Avenue) in downtown Annapolis. This intersection is next to Government House, the residence of the Governor of Maryland, and one block north of the Maryland State House. MD 70 heads northwest for two blocks as Bladen Street, a four-lane divided boulevard that passes between state office buildings, including the offices of members of the Maryland General Assembly. At Calvert Street, the highway's name changes to Roscoe Rowe Boulevard. A two-lane ramp splits from southbound MD 70 just south of the southern end of the highway's bridge over College Creek, the point at which maintenance responsibility changes from the city of Annapolis to the state. The highway passes between several sets of government offices, including the Maryland Court of Appeals and the Maryland State Archives, leading up to its intersection with MD 435 (Taylor Avenue). MD 70 passes to the east of Navy–Marine Corps Memorial Stadium before crossing Weems Creek and leaving the city of Annapolis. The highway meets US 50/US 301/MD 2 (John Hanson Highway) at a partial cloverleaf interchange. Beyond the interchange, MD 70 curves to the west and intersects Bestgate Road and Tidewater Colony Drive; the latter street leads to the historic home Howard's Inheritance. The highway continues along Bestgate Road and becomes a four-lane road with a center left-turn lane before reaching its northern terminus at an arbitrary point west of Compton Drive and Willie Drive. Bestgate Road continues west as a county highway toward the Westfield Annapolis shopping mall in the center of Parole.

== History ==
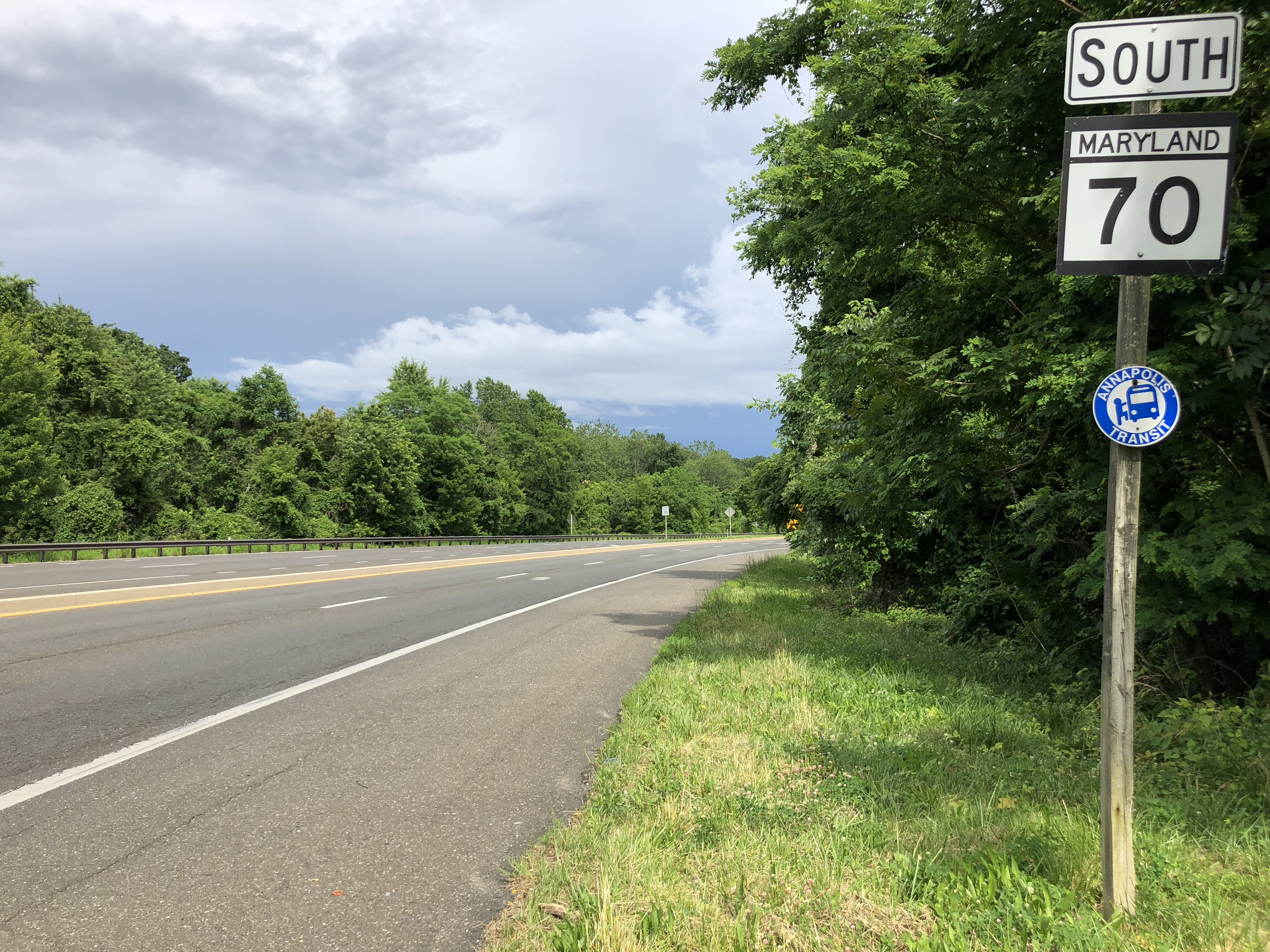
MD 70 southbound approaching I-595/US 50/US 301/MD 2 in Parole

MD 70 from College Avenue to US 50 and US 301 is named for Roscoe C. Rowe, the mayor of Annapolis from 1949 until his 1952 death. Rowe was credited with organizing the city of Annapolis's financial contribution to construct the boulevard and for persuading the Maryland State Roads Commission to finance the construction of the bridge across College Creek. Construction of MD 70 began from US 50, then also under construction, to Weems Creek, including the bridge over the creek, in October 1952. Construction on the highway resumed in May 1954; the section from Weems Creek to College Avenue was completed in November 1954, five months after the US 50 freeway opened from MD 450 to MD 2 east of the Severn River. The boulevard's interchange with US 50 was originally a trumpet interchange. MD 70's southern end was originally a one-way pair; traffic leaving Annapolis followed Bladen Street from College Avenue toward College Creek and traffic entering Annapolis veered south onto Northwest Street to end at Church Circle. Bladen Street was expanded to a two-way boulevard in 1983. MD 70 was extended north to its present terminus and its junction with US 50 and US 301 was changed to a partial cloverleaf interchange in 1991. The state highway's bridges over Weems Creek and College Creek were replaced between 2004 and 2006.

== Junction list ==
The entire route is in Anne Arundel County.

Location	mi	km	Destinations	Notes
Annapolis	0.00	0.00	MD 450 (College Avenue)	Southern terminus
Annapolis	0.79	1.27	MD 435 (Taylor Avenue)	
Parole	1.61	2.59	US 50 / US 301 / MD 2 (John Hanson Highway) to I-97 – Washington, Baltimore, Bay Bridge	US 50 Exit 24; eastern terminus of US 50 and US 301 concurrency with unsigned I-595
Parole	2.31	3.72	Bestgate Road west	Northern terminus
1.000 mi = 1.609 km; 1.000 km = 0.621 mi

== Auxiliary routes ==
MD 70 has two existing auxiliary routes and one former route. All three routes were established in 2002 along county highways relocated as part of the extension of MD 70 north to Bestgate Road.

- MD 70A is the designation for the 0.15-mile (0.24 km) stretch of North Lawrence Road north from MD 70.
- MD 70B was the designation for the 0.09-mile (0.14 km) portion of Tidewater Colony Drive south from the intersection between Roscoe Rowe Boulevard and Bestgate Road. MD 70B was transferred to county maintenance in 2009.
- MD 70C is the designation for the 0.08-mile (0.13 km) segment of Bestgate Road east from the intersection of MD 70 and Tidewater Colony Drive.
