= Naval Academy, Maryland =

- Census-designated place
- Coordinates: 38°58′59″N 76°29′23″W
- Country: United States
- State: Maryland
- County: Anne Arundel

Area
  - Total: 0.86 sq mi (2.22 km^{2})
  - Land: 0.53 sq mi (1.38 km^{2})
  - Water: 0.32 sq mi (0.83 km^{2})

Population (2020)
  - Total: 485
  - Density: 907.4/sq mi (350.34/km^{2})
- Time zone: UTC−5 (Eastern (EST))
  - Summer (DST): UTC−4 (EDT)
- ZIP code: 21402 (administration & faculty), 21412 (student dormitory)
- Area codes: 410, 443, and 667
- FIPS code: 24-55050

Naval Academy is a census-designated place (CDP) in Anne Arundel County, Maryland, United States, which covers the campus of the United States Naval Academy. The population was 4,802 at the 2010 census.

== Geography ==
According to the United States Census Bureau, the CDP has a total area of 0.85 square miles (2.2 km^{2}), of which 0.54 square miles (1.4 km^{2}) is land and 0.31 square miles (0.8 km^{2}), or 36.85%, is water.

== Demographics ==
Historical population
Census	Pop.	Note	%±
1980	5,367		—
1990	5,420		1.0%
2000	4,264		−21.3%
2010	4,802		12.6%
2020	485		−89.9%

As of the census of 2000, there were 4,264 people, 249 households, and 225 families living in the CDP. The population density was 7,706.5 inhabitants per square mile (2,975.5/km^{2}). There were 263 housing units at an average density of 475.3 per square mile (183.5/km^{2}). The racial makeup of the CDP was 87.10% White, 5.49% African American, 0.33% Native American, 2.95% Asian, 0.12% Pacific Islander, 1.83% from other races, and 2.18% from two or more races. Hispanic or Latino of any race were 6.94% of the population.

There were 249 households, out of which 65.1% had children under the age of 18 living with them, 87.1% were married couples living together, 2.4% had a female householder with no husband present, and 9.6% were non-families. 7.2% of all households were made up of individuals, and 1.2% had someone living alone who was 65 years of age or older. The average household size was 3.37 and the average family size was 3.56.

In the CDP, the population was spread out, with 8.0% under the age of 18, 80.5% from 18 to 24, 8.8% from 25 to 44, 2.4% from 45 to 64, and 0.3% who were 65 years of age or older. The median age was 21 years. For every 100 females, there were 373.3 males. For every 100 females age 18 and over, there were 436.8 males.

The median income for a household in the CDP was $63,333, and the median income for a family was $63,750. Males had a median income of $6,536 versus $6,585 for females. The per capita income for the CDP was $11,491. None of the population or families were below the poverty line.
