= Parole, Maryland =

- Census-designated place
- Location of Parole, Maryland
- Coordinates: 38°59′30″N 76°32′54″W
- Country: United States
- State: Maryland
- County: Anne Arundel

Area
  - Total: 11.88 sq mi (30.77 km^{2})
  - Land: 10.27 sq mi (26.60 km^{2})
  - Water: 1.61 sq mi (4.18 km^{2})
- Elevation: 69 ft (21 m)

Population (2020)
  - Total: 17,877
  - Density: 1,740.8/sq mi (672.14/km^{2})
- Time zone: UTC−5 (Eastern (EST))
  - Summer (DST): UTC−4 (EDT)
- FIPS code: 24-60325
- GNIS feature ID: 0590979

Parole, a suburb of Annapolis, is a census-designated place (CDP) in Anne Arundel County, Maryland, United States. The population was 15,922 at the 2010 census. It has several major roads intersect at the western edge of the state capital, Annapolis, and it contains the Annapolis Mall, a number of other large shopping centers, and the Anne Arundel Medical Center.

== Etymology ==
The neighborhood was named because it was a parole camp, where Union and Confederate prisoners of war were brought for mutual exchange and eventual return to their respective homes.

== Geography ==
Parole is located at 38°59′30″N 76°32′54″W (38.991657, −76.548450). It is bordered to the southeast by the city of Annapolis and by the CDP of Annapolis Neck. To the northeast is the Severn River, with the Arnold CDP on the other side. To the southwest is the South River, with the CDP of Riva on the other side.

U.S. Route 50 is a six-to-eight-lane expressway that runs through the community, leading west to Washington, D.C., and east to the Chesapeake Bay Bridge and Maryland's Eastern Shore. The highway intersects Interstate 97, which leads north to Baltimore, along the northern edge of the CDP.

According to the United States Census Bureau, the CDP has a total area of 11.8 square miles (30.6 km^{2}), of which 10.3 square miles (26.6 km^{2}) is land and 1.5 square miles (4.0 km^{2}), or 13.20%, is water.

== Demographics ==
Historical population
Census	Pop.	Note	%±
2000	14,031		—
2010	15,922		13.5%
2020	17,877		12.3%
U.S. Decennial Census

=== 2020 census ===
As of the 2020 census, Parole had a population of 17,877. The median age was 52.9 years. 11.4% of residents were under the age of 18 and 33.1% of residents were 65 years of age or older. For every 100 females, there were 86.9 males, and for every 100 females age 18 and over there were 84.3 males age 18 and over.

100.0% of residents lived in urban areas, while 0.0% lived in rural areas.

There were 9,029 households in Parole, of which 13.9% had children under the age of 18 living in them. Of all households, 39.2% were married-couple households, 19.2% were households with a male householder and no spouse or partner present, and 35.2% were households with a female householder and no spouse or partner present. About 42.3% of all households were made up of individuals and 21.1% had someone living alone who was 65 years of age or older.

There were 9,800 housing units, of which 7.9% were vacant. The homeowner vacancy rate was 1.8% and the rental vacancy rate was 6.9%.

Racial composition as of the 2020 census
Race	Number	Percent
White	14,576	81.5%
Black or African American	1,280	7.2%
American Indian and Alaska Native	59	0.3%
Asian	528	3.0%
Native Hawaiian and Other Pacific Islander	6	0.0%
Some other race	364	2.0%
Two or more races	1,064	6.0%
Hispanic or Latino (of any race)	934	5.2%

=== 2000 census ===
As of the 2000 census, there were 14,031 people, 6,645 households, and 3,707 families residing in the CDP. The population density was 1,364.4 inhabitants per square mile (526.8/km^{2}). There were 6,946 housing units at an average density of 675.4 per square mile (260.8/km^{2}). The racial makeup of the CDP was 90.36% White, 6.49% African American, 0.21% Native American, 1.53% Asian, 0.08% Pacific Islander, 0.34% from other races, and 0.98% from two or more races. Hispanic or Latino of any race were 1.56% of the population.

There were 6,645 households, out of which 14.1% had children under the age of 18 living with them, 48.7% were married couples living together, 5.3% had a female householder with no husband present, and 44.2% were non-families. 37.7% of all households were made up of individuals, and 18.4% had someone living alone who was 65 years of age or older. The average household size was 1.96 and the average family size was 2.54.

In the CDP, the population was spread out, with 12.2% under the age of 18, 5.8% from 18 to 24, 27.4% from 25 to 44, 27.6% from 45 to 64, and 27.0% who were 65 years of age or older. The median age was 48 years. For every 100 females, there were 93.7 males. For every 100 females age 18 and over, there were 91.6 males.

The median income for a household in the CDP was $67,479, and the median income for a family was $82,988. Males had a median income of $60,601 versus $43,610 for females. The per capita income for the CDP was $39,102. About 0.2% of families and 2.7% of the population were below the poverty line, including 1.0% of those under age 18 and 3.5% of those age 65 or over.

== Government and infrastructure ==
The Maryland Department of Agriculture has its headquarters in Parole.

== Education ==
Anne Arundel County Public Schools has its headquarters in Parole. Rolling Knolls Elementary and Annapolis High School are also in Parole.

The headquarters of the Anne Arundel County Public Library are in Parole; this is not a library branch.
