= List of Interstate Highways in Maryland =

Interstate Highways of the Maryland highway system
- Standard route signs in Maryland
- Interstate Highways highlighted in red

Highway names
- Interstates: Interstate X (I-X)

System links
- Maryland highway system; Interstate; US; State; Scenic Byways

The following is a list of Interstate Highways in Maryland. There are currently 16 Interstate Highways that exist entirely or partially in the U.S. state of Maryland. Six of these are primary interstates while ten are auxiliary interstates related to one of the primary interstates. The longest primary interstate in Maryland is Interstate 95 (commonly abbreviated I-95) at 110.01 mi (177.04 km). The shortest primary interstate in Maryland is I-81 at 12.08 mi (19.44 km). I-97 is the shortest primary interstate at 17.62 mi (28.36 km) and the shortest intrastate interstate. I-97 is also the only primary interstate to be located entirely within one county and to not connect with any other primary interstate. The longest auxiliary interstate in Maryland is I-695 at 51.48 mi (82.85 km). The shortest auxiliary interstate in Maryland is I-295 at 0.80 mi (1.29 km). All interstates are maintained by the Maryland State Highway Administration except for all of I-395, all of I-895, a small part of I-695, I-95 within and north of Baltimore, and I-83 within Baltimore. Maryland has one unsigned interstate, I-595; that highway is marked as U.S. Route 50 and US 301, which are concurrent with I-595 for its entire length. Maryland has three former interstates which are shaded in dark gray in the list.

Number	Length (mi)	Length (km)	Southern or western terminus	Northern or eastern terminus	Formed	Removed	Notes
I-68	81.09	130.50	I-68 at the West Virginia state line near Friendsville	I-70 / US 40 / US 522 in Hancock	1991	current	Formerly designated as US 48.
I-70	91.85	147.82	I-70 / US 522 at the Pennsylvania state line in Hancock	I-695 / MD 570 in Woodlawn	1962	current	Frederick–Baltimore section was designated I-70N in 1965; that section became part of I-70 in 1974
I-70N	93.62	150.67	I-70 in Frederick	MD 122 / Park and ride in Baltimore	1965	1974	Frederick–Baltimore section was designated I-70N in 1965; that section became part of I-70 in 1974
I-70S	32.60	52.46	I-495 / MD 355 in Bethesda	I-70 / US 40 in Frederick	1959	1974	Designated I-70S in 1959; became I-270 in 1974
I-81	12.08	19.44	I-81 at the West Virginia state line in Williamsport	I-81 at the Pennsylvania state line near Hagerstown	1959	current	
I-83	34.50	55.52	Fayette Street and President Street in Baltimore	I-83 at the Pennsylvania state line at Maryland Line	1959	current	
I-95	109.01	175.43	I-95 / I-495 at the Virginia state line near Oxon Hill	I-95 at the Delaware state line near Elkton	1963	current	
I-97	17.62	28.36	US 50 / US 301 in Parole	I-695 / I-895 in Ferndale	1987	current	
I-170	1.40	2.25	US 1 / US 40 in Baltimore	US 40 in Baltimore	1981	1985	Replaced by US 40
I-195	4.35	7.00	I-95 / MD 166 in Arbutus	MD 170 near BWI Airport	1989	current	
I-270	32.60	52.46	I-495 / MD 355 in Bethesda	I-70 / US 40 in Frederick	1974	current	Designated I-70S in 1959; became I-270 in 1974
I-270Y	2.10	3.38	I-495 near Bethesda	I-270 near North Bethesda	1974	current	Known as I-270 Spur but referred to as I-270Y by MDSHA. Was originally I-270 when the current I-270 was I-70S.
I-295	0.80	1.29	I-95 / I-495 / MD 210 in Oxon Hill	I-295 in Washington, D.C.	1965	current	
I-370	2.54	4.09	Sam Eig Highway in Gaithersburg	MD 200 in Redland	1989	current	
I-395	1.33	2.14	I-95 in Baltimore	Howard Street and Camden Street in Baltimore	1981	current	
I-495	41.09	66.13	I-95 / I-495 at the Virginia state line near Oxon Hill	I-495 at the Virginia state line near Cabin John	1963	current	Beltway around Washington, D.C.
I-595	19.97	32.14	I-95 / I-495 / US 50 near Glenarden	US 50 / US 301 / MD 70 in Parole	1991	current	Unsigned highway; signed as US 50 and US 301
I-695	51.46	82.82	Beltway around Baltimore		1959	current	
I-795	8.99	14.47	I-695 in Pikesville	MD 140 / MD 795 in Reisterstown	1985	current	
I-895	14.87	23.93	I-95 in Elkridge	I-95 in Baltimore	1979	current	
I-895A	0.71	1.14	I-97 in Brooklyn Park	I-895B in Brooklyn Park	1957	current	Northward Unsigned highway extension of I-97
I-895B	2.67	4.30	MD 2 in Brooklyn Park	I-895 in Brooklyn Park	1957	current	Unsigned highway except for mile marker posts
Former
