= Maryland Route 769 =

State highway in Maryland, United States

Maryland Route 769

Route information
- Maintained by MDSHA
- Existed: 1954–present

Location
- Country: United States
- State: Maryland
- Counties: Prince George's

Highway system
- Maryland highway system; Interstate; US; State; Scenic Byways
← MD 768	→ MD 776

Maryland Route 769 (MD 769) is a collection of unsigned state highways in the U.S. state of Maryland. These three highways are sections of old alignment of MD 201 and the former MD 205 in Bladensburg. MD 769D and MD 769C form the old alignment of MD 201 between a dead end next to the Baltimore–Washington Parkway and MD 450. MD 769B forms part of the old alignment of MD 205 in Bladensburg and Edmonston. The portions of MD 201 and MD 205 that are now part of MD 769 were constructed in the mid- to late 1920s and widened in the early 1940s. Modern MD 201 was constructed in the early to mid-1950s; many of the bypassed sections later became portions of MD 769.

== Route description ==
=== South of MD 201 ===
MD 769D is the designation for 52nd Avenue, a 0.29-mile (0.47 km) section of old alignment of MD 201 on the southern edge of Bladensburg. The state highway begins at a dead end adjacent to the Baltimore–Washington Parkway. MD 769D heads north as a two-lane undivided road through an industrial area, crossing the Alexandria Extension of CSX's Capital Subdivision railroad line at-grade before reaching its northern terminus at MD 201 (Kenilworth Avenue). MD 769C continues north along the same general alignment, but the two segments of MD 769 meet MD 201 at separate intersections 0.06 miles (0.097 km) apart.

=== MD 201 to MD 450 ===
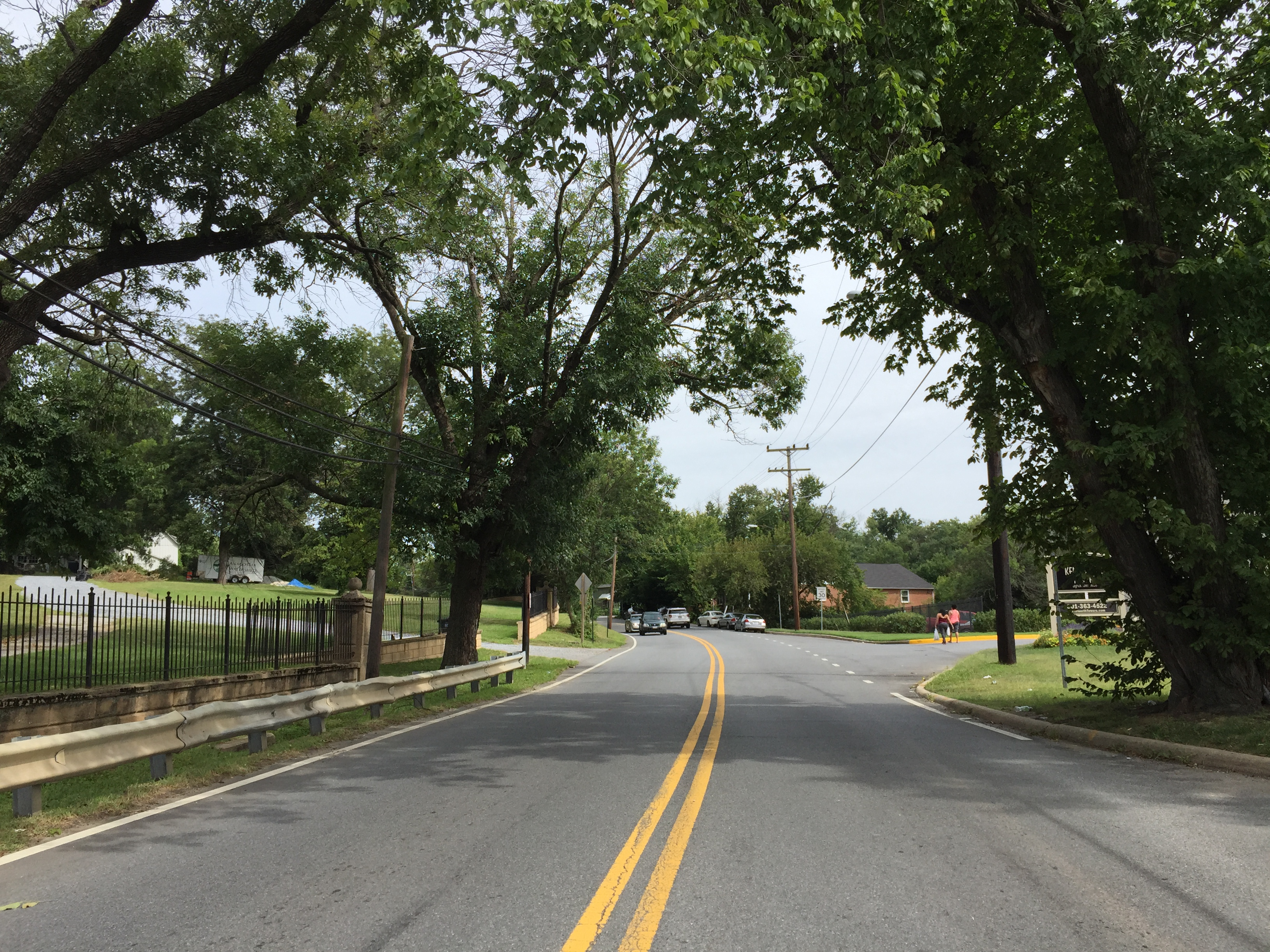
View south along MD 769C in Bladensburg

MD 769C is a 1.06 mi (1.71 km) segment of old alignment of MD 201 in Bladensburg. The state highway begins as 52nd Avenue a short distance north of MD 769D's northern terminus. MD 769C heads north as a two-lane undivided road through an industrial area, then enters the town of Bladensburg and curves to the west through a residential area. The state highway meets Quincy Street on a tangent and assumes that name, then turns north and becomes 48th Street at the intersection with an unnamed road that provides access to northbound MD 201. After an intersection with MD 450 (Annapolis Road), MD 769C reaches its northern terminus at another interchange with northbound MD 201.

=== North of MD 450 ===
MD 769B is the designation for a 0.45-mile (0.72 km) state-maintained segment of Edmonston Road that was formerly the southernmost portion of MD 205. The state highway begins at an intersection with MD 450 (Annapolis Road) a short distance east of MD 769C. MD 769B heads north as a two-lane undivided road, leaving the town of Bladensburg before reaching its northern terminus between 51st Street and 53rd Place in the town of Edmonston.

== History ==
MD 769 forms parts of the old alignment of MD 201 and MD 205. The latter highway followed much of what is today MD 201 from U.S. Route 50 (now MD 450) in Bladensburg to MD 430 (now MD 193) in Greenbelt. The portion of MD 205 from Bladensburg to Riverdale Park was constructed as a 15-foot-wide (4.6 m) concrete road between 1924 and 1926. The section of MD 201, then known as River Road, from Tuxedo Road (now MD 459) in Cheverly north to US 50 in Bladensburg was constructed as a 15-to-18-foot-wide (4.6 to 5.5 m) concrete road in 1929. MD 205 and MD 201 were widened with a pair of 3.5-foot-wide (1.1 m) bituminous shoulders in 1940 and 1941, respectively. Construction on modern MD 201 as a divided highway from Washington to Greenbelt began in 1952. The first segment of the highway, from Cheverly north to Inwood Street (at the 52nd Street intersection) was started in 1952 and completed in 1954, bypassing what is now MD 769D. The new MD 201 was extended north from Inwood Street to Upshur Street north of the new MD 450 interchange and from there to Riverdale Park from 1954 to 1956; these projects bypassed modern MD 769C and MD 769B, respectively. The MD 205 designation was removed in favor of MD 201 north of Bladensburg in 1956; the old segments of MD 201 and MD 205 later became segments of MD 769.

== Junction list ==
=== MD 769D ===
The entire route is in Bladensburg, Prince George's County.

mi	km	Destinations	Notes
0.00	0.00	Dead end	Southern terminus of MD 769D
0.29	0.47	MD 201 (Kenilworth Avenue) – Greenbelt, Washington	Northern terminus of MD 769D
1.000 mi = 1.609 km; 1.000 km = 0.621 mi

=== MD 769C ===
The entire route is in Bladensburg, Prince George's County.

mi	km	Destinations	Notes
0.00	0.00	MD 201 (Kenilworth Avenue) – Greenbelt, Washington	Southern terminus of MD 769D
0.55	0.89	Quincy Street east	Old alignment of MD 202; MD 769C continues west as Quincy Street
0.82	1.32	To MD 201 north	Unsigned MD 201A; MD 769C continues north as 48th Street
0.95	1.53	MD 450 (Annapolis Road) – Hyattsville, New Carrollton	
1.06	1.71	MD 201 north – Greenbelt	Northern terminus of MD 769C
1.000 mi = 1.609 km; 1.000 km = 0.621 mi

=== MD 769B ===
The entire route is in Prince George's County.

Location	mi	km	Destinations	Notes
Bladensburg	0.00	0.00	MD 450 (Annapolis Road) – Hyattsville, New Carrollton	Southern terminus of MD 769B
Edmonston	0.45	0.72	Edmonston Road north	Bladensburg town limit; northern terminus of MD 769B
1.000 mi = 1.609 km; 1.000 km = 0.621 mi
