= Maryland Route 201 =

State highway in Prince George's County, Maryland, United States

Maryland Route 201
- Maryland Route 201 highlighted in red

Route information
- Maintained by MDSHA
- Length: 9.40 mi (15.13 km)
- Existed: 1927–present

Major junctions
- South end: DC 295 in Washington, DC
- US 50 / MD 295 / MD 459 in Tuxedo; MD 450 in Bladensburg; MD 410 in Riverdale Park; MD 193 in Greenbelt; I-95 / I-495 in Greenbelt
- North end: MD 212 in Beltsville

Location
- Country: United States
- State: Maryland
- Counties: Prince George's

Highway system
- Maryland highway system; Interstate; US; State; Scenic Byways
← MD 200	→ MD 202

Maryland Route 201 (MD 201) is a state highway in the U.S. state of Maryland. Known for most of its length as Kenilworth Avenue, the highway runs 9.40 miles (15.13 km) from the District of Columbia boundary in Tuxedo, where the highway continues south as District of Columbia Route 295 (DC 295), north to MD 212 in Beltsville. MD 201 is a four to six-lane divided highway that connects Washington, D.C., with the northern Prince George's County municipalities of Cheverly, Bladensburg, Edmonston, Riverdale Park, College Park, Berwyn Heights, and Greenbelt. The highway also provides part of the connections from Interstate 95 (I-95)/I-495 to a pair of Washington Metro stations. MD 201 was built as two separate highways in the late 1920s: MD 201 from Washington, D.C., to Bladensburg and MD 205 from Bladensburg to Greenbelt. These highways, some of which became MD 769, were replaced with a relocated Kenilworth Avenue in the mid 1950s, including the Kenilworth Interchange with U.S. Route 50 (US 50) and the Baltimore–Washington Parkway in Tuxedo. MD 201 was extended north to Beltsville in the early 1960s. The Maryland State Highway Administration (MDSHA) plans to extend MD 201 north toward Laurel.

== Route description ==
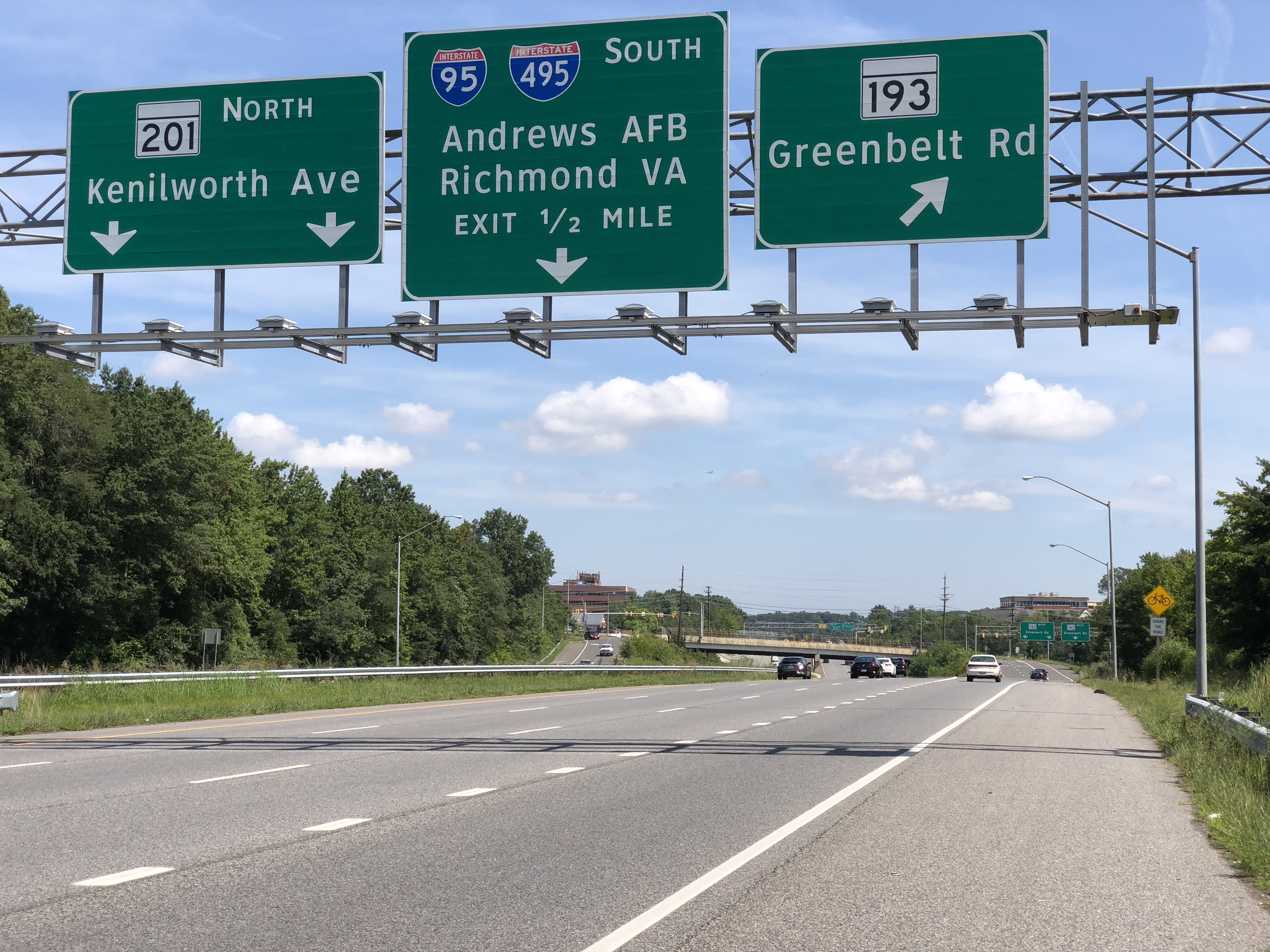
MD 201 northbound at the MD 193 interchange in Greenbelt

MD 201 begins at the District of Columbia boundary in Tuxedo as Kenilworth Avenue, which continues into Washington, D.C., as DC 295. The six-lane freeway enters Maryland by passing under Eastern Avenue, which has an extra-wide bridge over the freeway. MD 201 heads north paralleled by unsigned MD 965 (Kenilworth Avenue), a one-way service road to and from Eastern Avenue that parallels the freeway along a narrow roadway; there are ramps from MD 965 to northbound MD 201 and from southbound MD 201 to MD 965. The freeway crosses over MD 965 and Amtrak's Northeast Corridor railroad line and enters the Kenilworth Interchange, which connects MD 201, US 50 (John Hanson Highway), the Baltimore–Washington Parkway (unsigned MD 295), and MD 459, which is also named Kenilworth Avenue. Just north of MD 201's bridges over US 50, two-lane ramps split from MD 201 to join the Baltimore–Washington Parkway. MD 201 becomes a four-lane expressway and has ramps to and from MD 459, which is used for access from northbound MD 201 to westbound US 50 and from westbound US 50 to northbound MD 201.

North of MD 459, MD 201 crosses over the Alexandria Extension of CSX's Capital Subdivision railroad line and curves northwest to pass under the Baltimore–Washington Parkway. North of the parkway, southbound MD 201 has a ramp to US 50 (New York Avenue) into Washington. MD 201 becomes a four-lane arterial road and has a staggered pair of intersections with 52nd Avenue, which heads south and north as MD 769D and MD 769C, respectively. MD 201 expands to six lanes and curves north into the town of Bladensburg. The highway drops to four lanes ahead of its partial cloverleaf interchange with MD 450 (Annapolis Road). Northbound MD 201 has two pairs of ramps for the interchange; the southern set are with MD 201A and the northern set are with the northern end of MD 769C (48th Street). MD 201 leaves Bladensburg, passes through the town of Edmonston, and meets the northern end of the southern segment of Edmonston Road in the town of Riverdale Park.

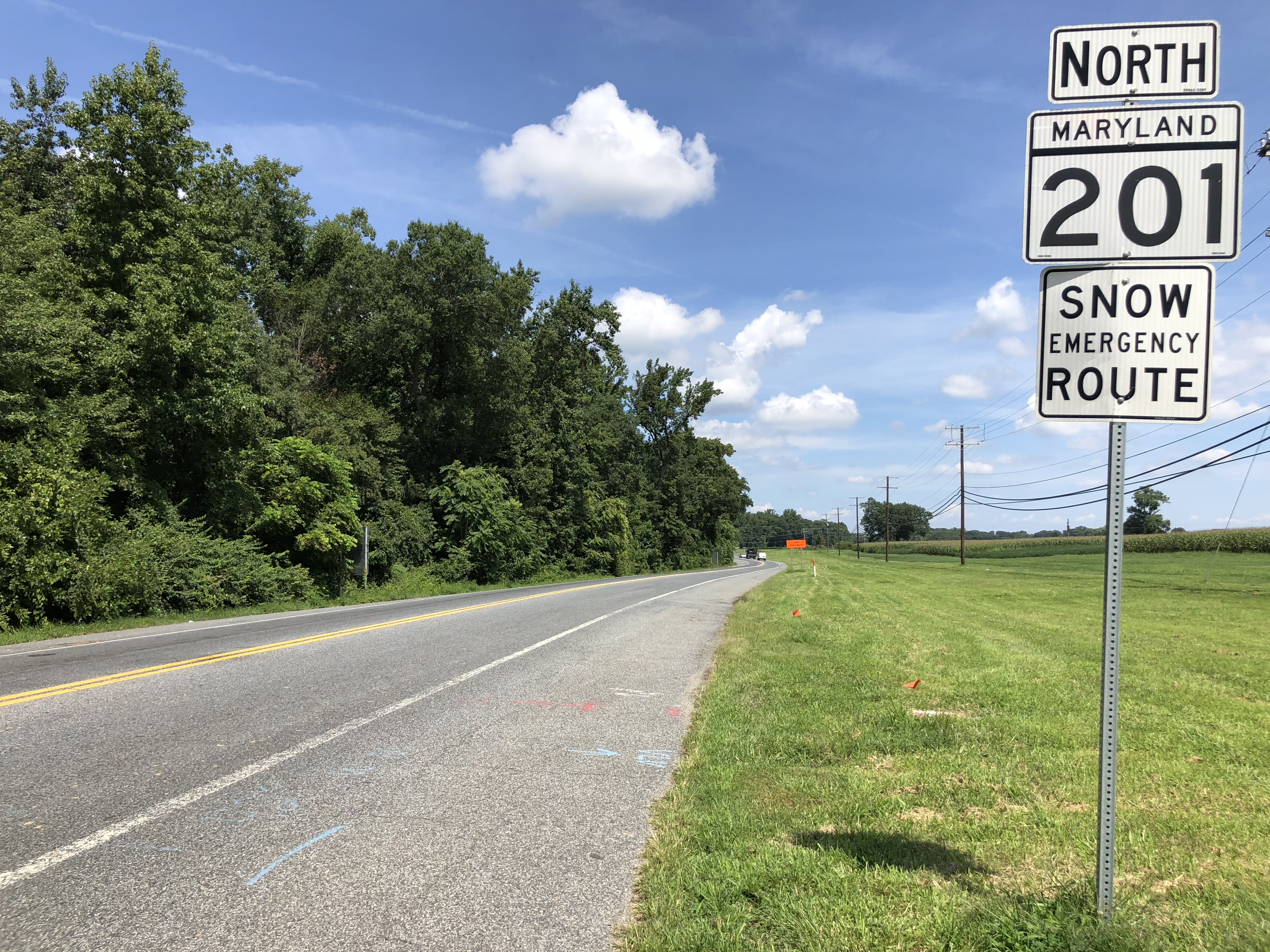
View north along MD 201 in Beltsville

MD 201 intersects Riverdale Road and MD 410 (East–West Highway), then follows the eastern boundary of Riverdale Park, meeting the southern terminus of MD 431 (River Road). The route runs along the border of Riverdale Park to Brier Ditch, just north of which the highway intersects Campus Drive and Good Luck Road. The former road provides access to the University of Maryland, the College Park Airport, and the College Park–University of Maryland station on the Washington Metro's Green Line. MD 201 begins to be paralleled by the middle segment of Edmonston Road to the west; this road forms the eastern boundary of the city of College Park and then the town of Berwyn Heights. On the east side of the state highway is Greenbelt Park within the city of Greenbelt. MD 201 expands to six lanes at its intersection with Pontiac Street then fully enters Greenbelt at its diamond interchange with MD 193 (Greenbelt Road).

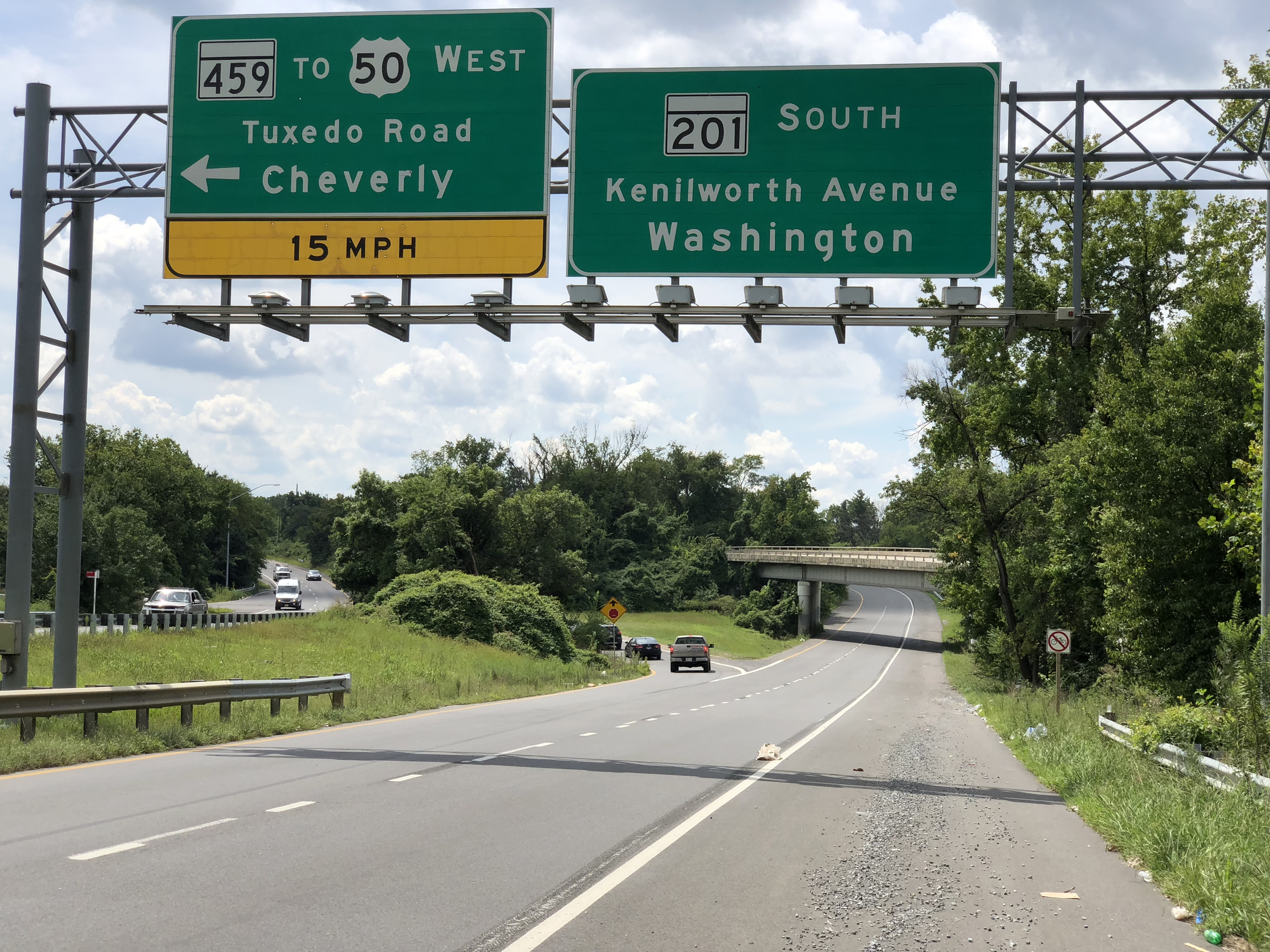
MD 201 southbound at MD 459/US 50 in Tuxedo

MD 201 has a partial cloverleaf interchange with I-95/I-495 (Capital Beltway) and meets the western end of Crescent Road opposite the entrance to MDSHA's District 3 office. The highway drops to four lanes at Ivy Lane as it curves northwest. MD 201 drops to two lanes and its name changes to Edmonston Road at the northern city limit of Greenbelt at Cherrywood Lane, which leads to the Greenbelt Metro station along the Green Line. The highway continues through the Beltsville Agricultural Research Center, within which the highway crosses Beaverdam Creek and curves north to its terminus at the intersection of Powder Mill Road and Edmonston Road on the eastern edge of Beltsville. The intersection also serves as the signed eastern terminus of MD 212, which is officially MD 212A at this location. Powder Mill Road continues east as the main highway through the research farm; Edmonston Road continues north as a county highway.

MD 201 is part of the main National Highway System from the District of Columbia to MD 459 just north of MD 201's interchange with US 50 and the Baltimore–Washington Parkway in Tuxedo. The highway is also an intermodal connector from Campus Drive near College Park to Cherrywood Lane in Greenbelt and a National Highway System principal arterial from MD 459 to Campus Drive.

== History ==
Maryland Route 205
- Location: Bladensburg–Greenbelt
- Existed: 1927–1956

The first segment of MD 201, which was then known as River Road, was constructed as a 15-to-18-foot-wide (4.6 to 5.5 m) concrete road from the District of Columbia boundary to Tuxedo Road (now MD 459) in Tuxedo in 1926 and 1927. The highway was extended north to US 50 (now MD 450) in Bladensburg in 1929. MD 201 was widened with a pair of 3.5-foot-wide (1.1 m) bituminous shoulders along its entire length in 1941. The state highway originally followed what is now MD 965 north from Eastern Avenue along the northbound side of the modern highway. MD 201 continued along a road that no longer exists across Beaverdam Creek and the Pennsylvania Railroad (now Amtrak Northeast Corridor). North of what is now US 50, the highway followed the Kenilworth Avenue portion of MD 459 to its junction with MD 201, where the route was broken by modern MD 201 and the Baltimore–Washington Parkway. MD 201 continued along what are today MD 769D and MD 769C (52nd Avenue, Quincy Street, and 48th Street) to US 50 in Bladensburg.

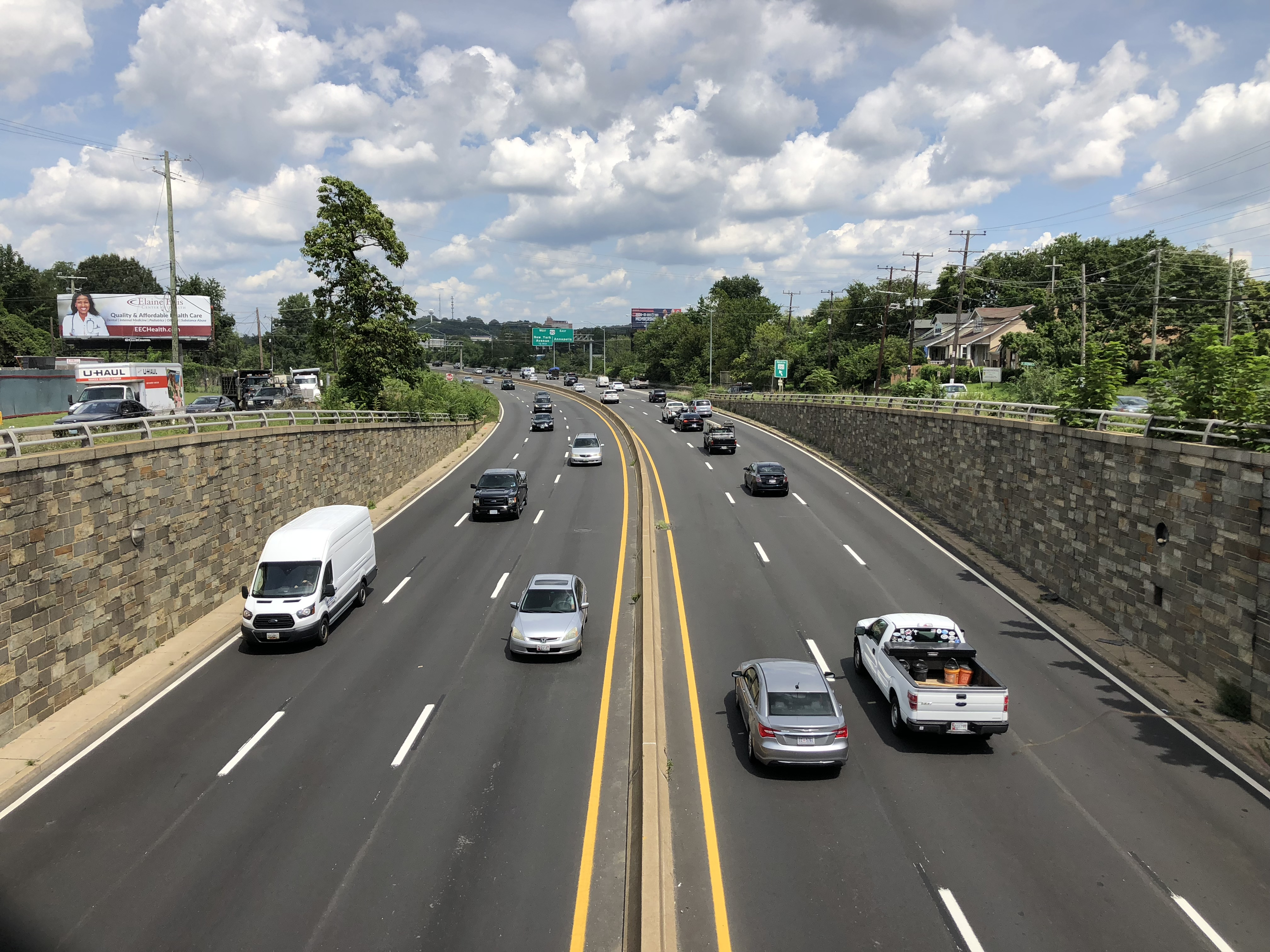
MD 201 northbound entering Tuxedo from Washington, D.C.

The first segment of MD 205, which comprised Edmonston Road from Bladensburg to Greenbelt, was constructed as a 15-foot-wide (4.6 m) concrete road from US 50 in Bladensburg to Riverdale Road in Riverdale Park between 1924 and 1926. The highway was extended north to Branchville Road (now MD 193) in Berwyn Heights between 1926 and 1928. MD 205 was widened with a pair of 3.5-foot-wide (1.1 m) bituminous shoulders along its entire length in 1940. The highway was relocated and given two new bridges across Brier Ditch in 1949 and 1950. MD 205 originally followed Edmonston Road, including all of MD 769B, from Bladensburg to Greenbelt. The highway followed the present alignment of MD 201 from the north end of Edmonston Road in East Riverdale to Old Calvert Road just north of Campus Drive in Riverdale Park.

Construction on modern MD 201 as a divided highway from Washington, D.C., to Greenbelt began in 1952. The first segment of the highway, from Creston Street (at the ramp from southbound MD 201 to MD 459) north to Inwood Street (at the 52nd Street intersection), was started in 1952 and completed in 1954 and included a bridge across the Baltimore and Ohio Railroad's Alexandria Branch. The new MD 201 was extended north from Inwood Street to Upshur Street north of the new MD 450 interchange and from there to the Brier Ditch relocation from 1954 to 1956. The new highway was constructed from the Brief Ditch relocation to just north of MD 430 (now MD 193) in Greenbelt starting in 1956; the divided highway was completed in 1958. The MD 205 designation was removed north of Bladensburg in 1956; the old segments of MD 201 and MD 205 became segments of MD 769.

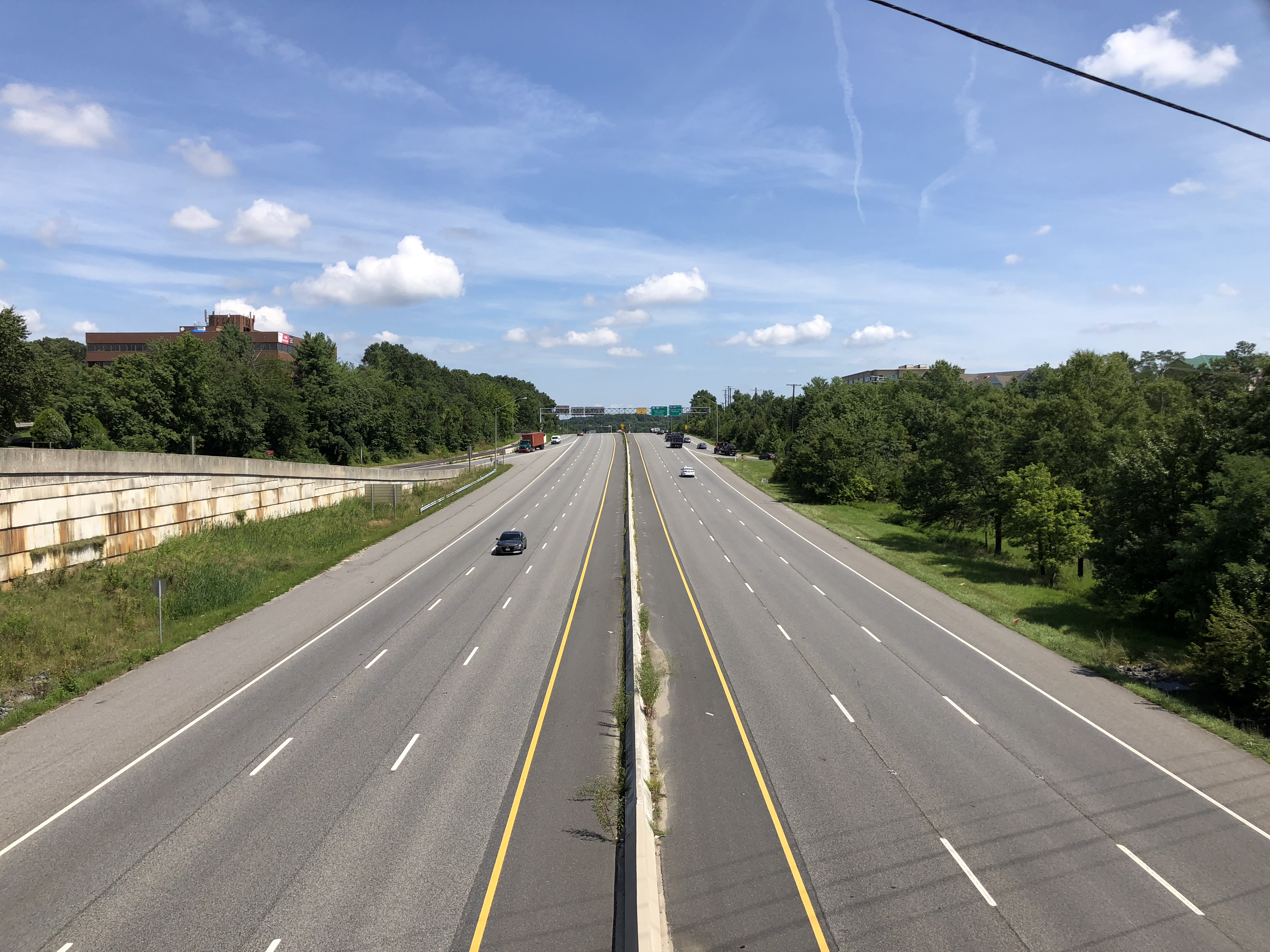
MD 201 northbound viewed from MD 193 in Greenbelt

Work on the Kenilworth or Tuxedo Interchange between MD 201, the Baltimore–Washington Parkway, and the Annapolis–Washington Expressway (US 50) began in 1954. The first highway through the interchange, the parkway and its continuation into Washington along New York Avenue, was completed in 1955. The new alignment of MD 201 from MD 459 to the District of Columbia was completed in 1957 and opened concurrently with the adjacent portion of expanded Kenilworth Avenue in the city. The portion of John Hanson Highway from New York Avenue to the interchange opened that same year. The final movements in the interchange, from MD 201 to eastbound US 50 and from westbound US 50 to MD 201, opened concurrent with the portion of John Hanson Highway from the Kenilworth Interchange to MD 704 in Lanham in 1962.

MD 201 was extended north along Edmonston Road through Greenbelt to MD 212 in Beltsville in 1962. The following year, the divided highway was extended north through the interchange with the Capital Beltway to relocated Crescent Road in Greenbelt. MD 201's diamond interchange with MD 193 was built in 1988. The MDSHA plans to extend MD 201 north as a multi-lane divided highway north from MD 212 in Beltsville to I-95 south of Laurel. The highway would split north from Edmonston Road north of Odell Road, cross over CSX's Capital Subdivision and US 1, and follow an existing right-of-way corridor to the intersection of Virginia Manor Road and Ritz Way. MD 201 would continue along Virginia Manor Road to Konterra Drive (Maryland Route 206), which has an interchange with I-95.

== Major intersections ==
The entire route is in Prince George's County.

Location	mi	km	Destinations	Notes
Tuxedo	0.00	0.00	DC 295 south (Anacostia Freeway) to I-295 south / I-95	Continuation into District of Columbia
Tuxedo	0.00	0.00	Eastern Avenue – Aquatic Gardens	Southbound exit and northbound entrance; ramps connect with unsigned MD 965
Tuxedo	0.49	0.79	US 50 east – Annapolis	Northbound exit and southbound entrance
Tuxedo	0.59	0.95	Baltimore–Washington Parkway north to I-95 – Baltimore	Northbound exit and southbound entrance; unsigned MD 295
Tuxedo	0.68	1.09	US 50 west / MD 459 south (Tuxedo Road) to New York Avenue – Cheverly	No southbound entrance; MD 459/Tuxedo Road not signed northbound
Tuxedo	1.24	2.00	US 50 west to New York Avenue – Washington	Southbound exit only
Bladensburg	1.30	2.09	Northern end of limited-access section	
Bladensburg	1.30	2.09	52nd Avenue	Staggered intersections; unsigned MD 769D (south) and MD 769C (north)
Bladensburg	2.12	3.41	MD 450 (Annapolis Road) to MD 202 – Hyattsville, New Carrollton	Partial cloverleaf interchange; northbound access is via MD 769C (48th Street)
Riverdale Park	3.90	6.28	MD 410 (East–West Highway) – Hyattsville, New Carrollton	
Riverdale Park	4.39	7.07	River Road (MD 431 north)	Southern terminus of unsigned MD 431
Greenbelt	6.64	10.69	MD 193 (Greenbelt Road)	Diamond interchange
Greenbelt	7.17	11.54	I-95 / I-495 (Capital Beltway) – Andrews AFB, Richmond, Silver Spring, College Park, Baltimore	I-95/I-495 exit 23
Beltsville	9.40	15.13	MD 212 west (Powder Mill Road)	Northern terminus; officially MD 212A; eastern terminus of MD 212A; road continues as Edmonston Road
1.000 mi = 1.609 km; 1.000 km = 0.621 mi: Incomplete access

== Auxiliary route ==
MD 201A is the designation for the unnamed 0.08-mile (0.13 km) connector between a right-in/right-out intersection with northbound MD 201 and MD 769C (48th Street) in the southeast quadrant of the MD 201–MD 450 interchange in Bladensburg.
