= College Park Academy =

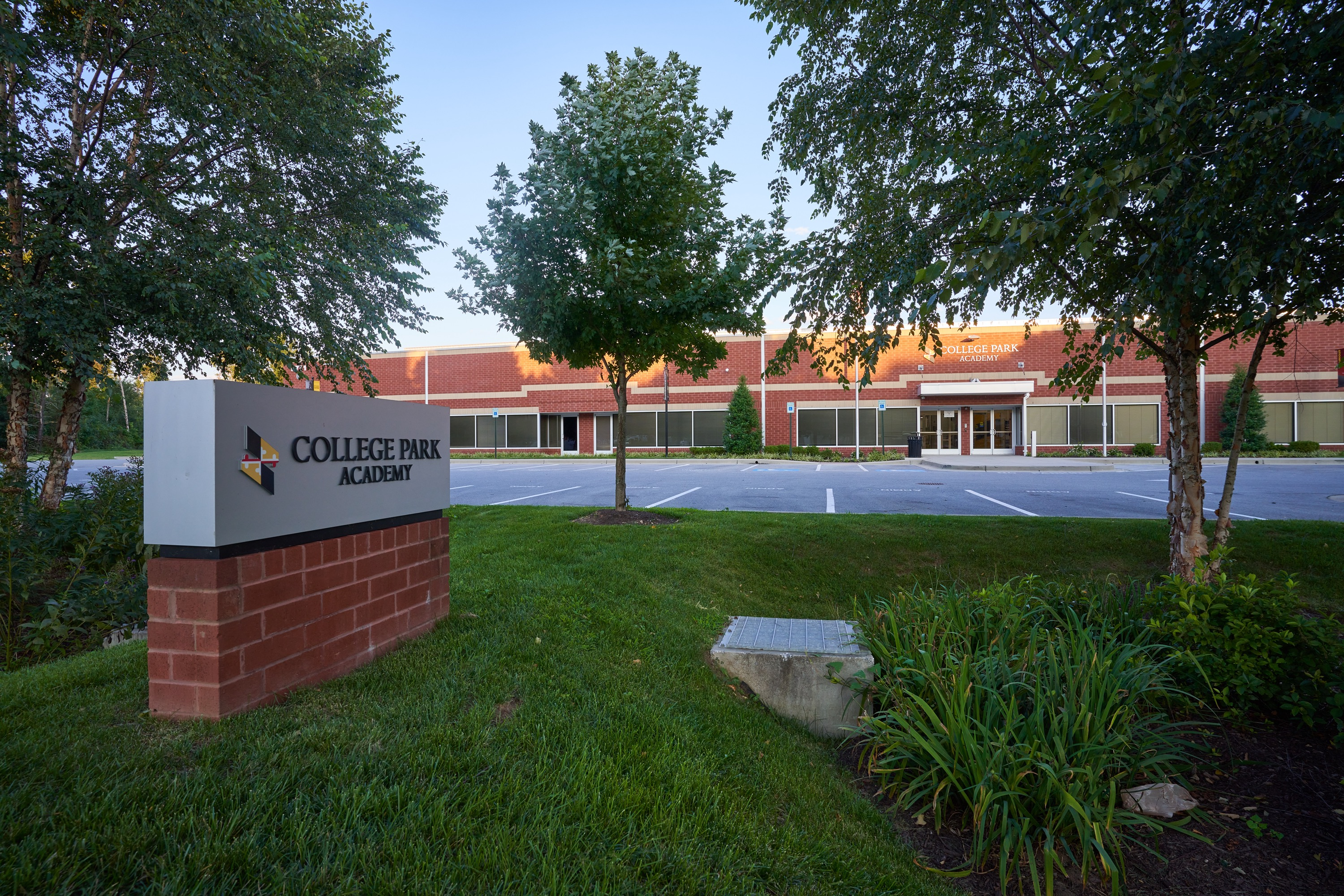

Location
- 5751 Rivertech Court, Riverdale Park, MD 20737; United States; 38.9682255°N 76.9275124°W

Information
- Opened: August 2013
- School district: Prince George's County Public Schools
- Superintendent: Kevin M. Maxwell
- Principal: Steven Baker, Gordon Libby
- Faculty: 41
- Grades: 6th–12th
- Gender: Co-educational
- Enrollment: 677
  - Grade 6: 118
  - Grade 7: 121
  - Grade 8: 128
  - Grade 9: 107
  - Grade 10: 80
  - Grade 11: 77
  - Grade 12: 46
- Campus type: Suburban
- Colors: Red; Black; Gold
- Team name: Phoenix
- Communities served: Prince George's County, Maryland, surrounding communities
- Website: collegeparkacademy.org

College Park Academy (commonly CPA) is a college preparatory, public, middle and high school age charter school located in the Discovery District of the University of Maryland, in Riverdale Park, Maryland. The school was founded by the city of College Park, and the University of Maryland, in collaboration with Prince George's County Public Schools.

== History ==
College Park Academy was founded as part of a joint initiative between College Park, Maryland and the University of Maryland. Established in 2013 as one of the first blended learning schools in Maryland to invest in the connection between the university and the community. College Park Academy utilizes an online Educational Technology platform to deliver the curriculum. This allows students to access their classes online in school or anywhere on the web, providing a more efficient method of teaching, with teachers acting as aids and guides whenever the students need them. The school uses a lottery-based system to allow students from all parts of the community to attend the school.

College Park Academy first attempted to lease the previous College Park elementary building in College Park, but there was community opposition. Instead it chose to lease space in the former St. Mark's School in Hyattsville. The school opened with grades 6–7 in August 2013 with about 300 students, and the first graduating class was in 2019. By 2022, the school had 677 students in grades 6–12.

The school built a new 50,400-square-foot (4,680 m^{2}) facility to house the students which opened in fall of 2017 at its new location, south of College Park-University of Maryland Discovery Direct station and opposite the National Weather Service building at the University of Maryland. Its permanent campus in Riverdale Park opened on Tuesday October 3, 2017. At the time the school had 500 students.

== Athletics ==
Soccer

College Park Academy launched its soccer program in 2024 without a proper field, training instead on a repurposed baseball pitch. Despite starting the season with an 0-5 record, the team showed remarkable resilience, finishing with a 7-6 record. Although they lost to International Langley High School in the regular season, they bounced back to defeat the six-time consecutive champions in the regional championship in their inaugural season. Along the way, they also secured wins against CMIT South, CMIT North, Frederick Douglass High School, and Largo High School. Their impressive run ended in the state quarterfinals with a 3-0 loss to Mountain Ridge.

== Curriculum ==
College Park Academy utilizes an online platform to deliver the curriculum. Which gives students a personalized learning experience that they can access online at school and at home and allows acceleration on an individual basis. CPA offers four foreign languages (Spanish, Chinese, French, American Sign Language). In 2022, College Park academy exceeded state and county benchmarks for college readiness in science, writing, and mathematics.

Students have the opportunity to earn university credits through Signature Programs. Signature Programs are centered around an academic discipline to give students exposure to the university academic experience while earning college credits in high school. The Signature Program offers coursework in the following disciplines: behavioral and social science, business, computer science, education, engineering, and public health.

CPA was designed to maximize opportunities for students to take University of Maryland credits and highschool credits concurrently. Since the founding CPA students have taken the following courses: Philosophy, Intro to Engineering Design, Computer Science, Intensive Intermediate French, Geography, Sociological Social Psychology, Intro to Criminal Justice, Infant Development, and General Astronomy. They also have the opportunity to take courses at other Universities in Maryland. In 2022, 70% of students took an AP Exam.

== Application process ==
CPA accepts students via a lottery process through Prince George's County Online Registration and Applications Process. Any rising 6-12 grade students that are currently enrolled in a public Prince George's County school can apply during the lottery window from November–January. Lottery preference will be given to students that meet one or more of the following: siblings of a current student; students that live in the close geographic proximity Elementary schools in the following Cachet Areas: Hollywood, Paint Branch, Riverdale, University Park, Cherokee Lane, Berwyn Heights; if the student is a child of a teacher or staff member.

== After-school programs ==
CPA Plus is a before and after school enrichment program that provides academic, athletic, and artistic extracurricular programs which supplement the growth and development of the students. CPA Plus provides a platform for UMD students and staff to provide STEM, tutoring, and fitness programs that enhance the academic aptitude, health, and well-being of the College Park Academy students. Through this partnership, the University of Maryland students are afforded service learning opportunities, internships, and paid positions which helps them to develop vocational and leadership skills for future employment. Students currently have access to programs in Model UN, dance, Robotics, and Sisters in Stem.

== College Park Academy Online ==
College Park Academy Online is permanently closed.

Established in 2022, College Park Academy Online operated as a private non-profit, 100% online school for children in grades 6–12. The school was launched in the aftermath of the COVID-19 pandemic to expand upon the success of curriculum and methods at College Park Academy and reach a wider audience. The school utilized an online curriculum giving students a personalized learning experience accessible online anywhere. CPA Online was accredited through the Maryland State Department of Education.

College Park Academy Online offered rolling admissions for students grades 6–12. Prospective students were required to pass an admissions standardized test in English. CPA Online accepted students globally provided they were proficient in English.
