= Maryland Route 431 =

State highway in Maryland, United States

Maryland Route 431
- MD 431 highlighted in red

Route information
- Maintained by MDSHA
- Length: 2.06 mi (3.32 km)
- Existed: 2019–present

Major junctions
- South end: MD 201 in Riverdale Park
- North end: US 1 in College Park

Location
- Country: United States
- State: Maryland
- Counties: Prince George's

Highway system
- Maryland highway system; Interstate; US; State; Scenic Byways
← MD 430	→ MD 432

Maryland Route 431 (MD 431) is a state highway in the U.S. state of Maryland, located in Prince George's County to the northeast of Washington, D.C. The route runs 2.06 miles (3.32 km) from MD 201 in Riverdale Park northwest to U.S. Route 1 (US 1) in College Park. What is now MD 431 was transferred to the state in 2017 as MD 594E and was renumbered to MD 431 in 2019.

== Route description ==
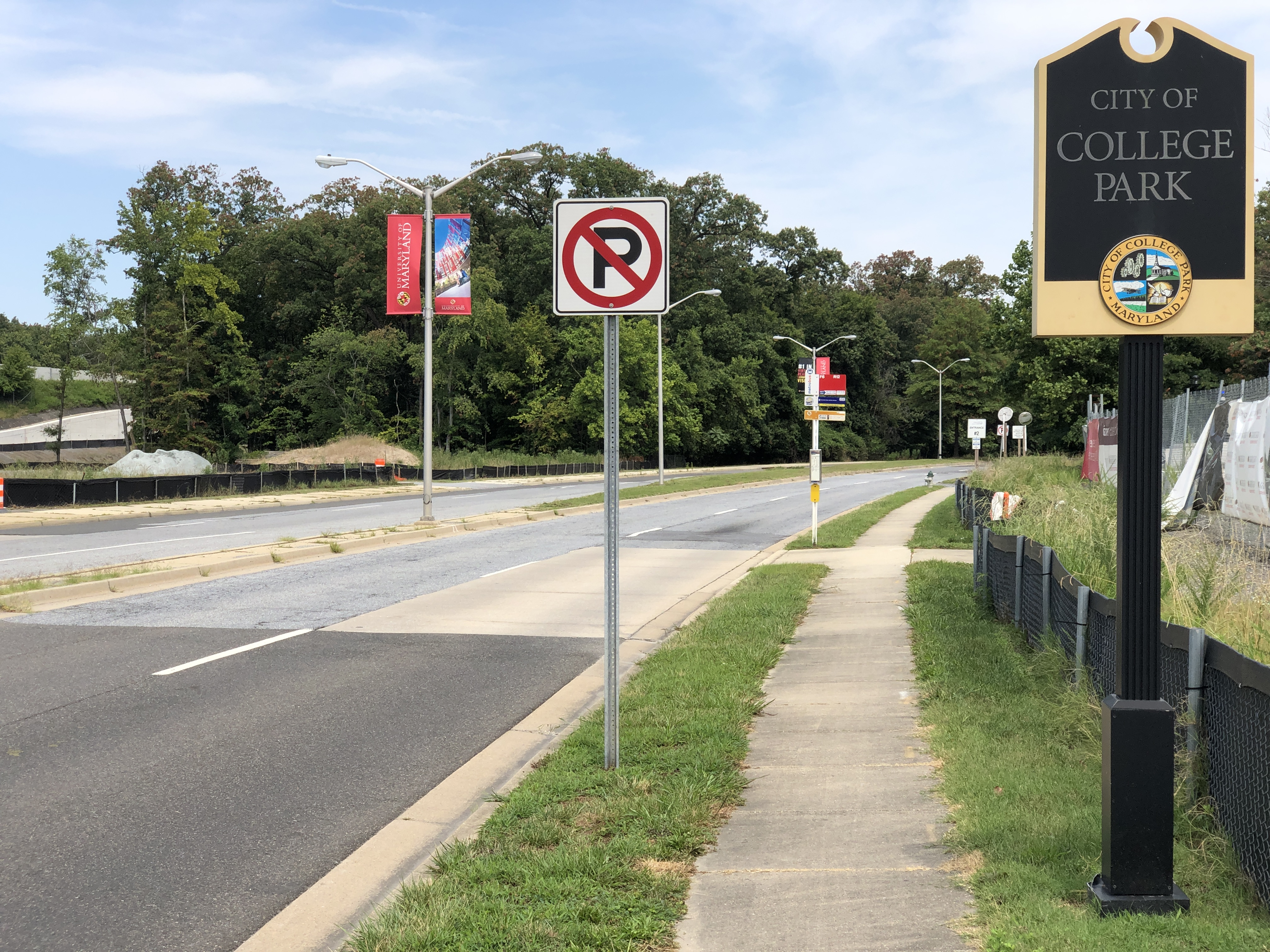
MD 431 northbound entering College Park from Riverdale Park

MD 431 begins at an intersection with MD 201 (Kenilworth Avenue) in Riverdale Park in Prince George's County. From here, the route heads west on River Road, a four-lane divided highway. The road crosses the Northeast Branch Anacostia River in a wooded area before it comes to an intersection at University Research Court/Haig Drive. The route crosses into College Park and curves north, running past business parks and passing to the east of the College Park–University of Maryland station that serves MARC's Camden Line and Washington Metro's Green Line. MD 431 turns northwest onto four-lane undivided Campus Drive and passes under CSX's Capital Subdivision railroad line, which carries MARC's Camden Line, and Washington Metro's Green and Yellow lines. The route runs past commercial development before it curves west and heads between Paint Branch Stream Valley Park to the north and residential areas to the south. The road turns to the north and runs between commercial development to the west and wooded areas of the park to the east. MD 431 curves northwest and becomes a divided highway before it reaches its terminus at an intersection with US 1 (Baltimore Avenue) on the eastern edge of the University of Maryland at College Park campus.

== History ==
What is now MD 431 was transferred from Prince George's County to the state as MD 594E in an agreement dated May 11, 2017. On August 27, 2019, MD 594E was renumbered to MD 431 per the request of Maryland State Highway Administration District 3.

== Junction list ==
The entire route is in Prince George's County.

Location	mi	km	Destinations	Notes
Riverdale Park	0.00	0.00	MD 201 (Kenilworth Avenue)	Southern terminus
College Park	2.06	3.32	US 1 (Baltimore Avenue) / Campus Drive west	Northern terminus
1.000 mi = 1.609 km; 1.000 km = 0.621 mi
