= Maryland Route 459 =

Highway in Maryland

Maryland Route 459

Route information
- Maintained by MDSHA
- Length: 1.25 mi (2.01 km)
- Existed: 1933–present

Major junctions
- South end: US 50 / Columbia Park Road in Cheverly
- North end: US 50 / MD 201 in Tuxedo

Location
- Country: United States
- State: Maryland
- Counties: Prince George's

Highway system
- Maryland highway system; Interstate; US; State; Scenic Byways
← MD 458	→ MD 460

Maryland Route 459 (MD 459) is a state highway in the U.S. state of Maryland. Known for much of its length as Tuxedo Road, the state highway runs 1.25 miles (2.01 km) from U.S. Route 50 (US 50) in Cheverly north to MD 201 in Tuxedo. MD 459 serves an industrial area in Cheverly and Tuxedo and connects the town to the Cheverly station of the Washington Metro. The state highway was constructed in the early 1930s. MD 459 originally followed Cheverly Avenue through the middle of Cheverly, but the state highway was rolled back to the US 50 interchange in the early 1970s.

== Route description ==
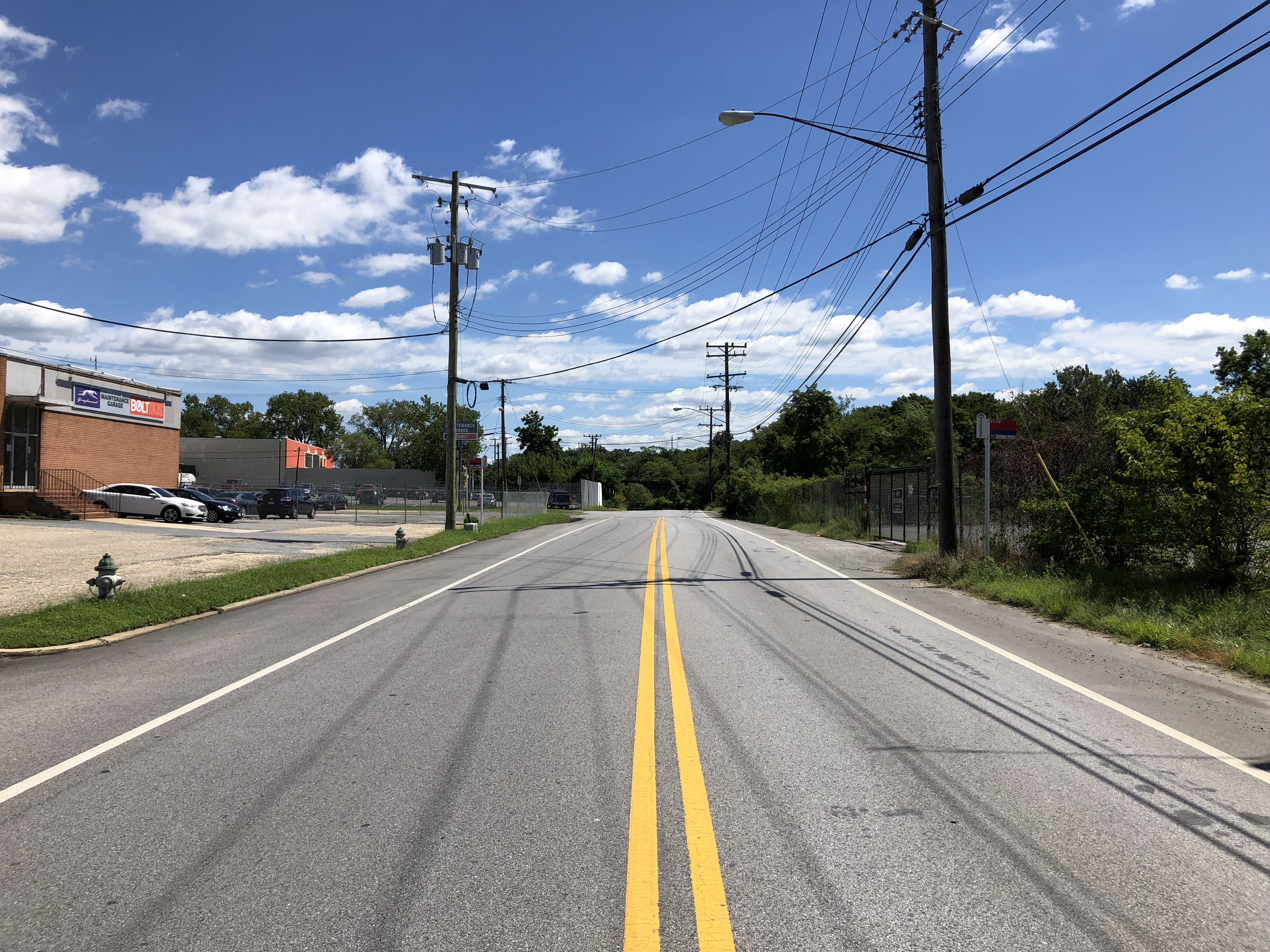
View east along MD 459 in Tuxedo

MD 459 begins at the intersection of Columbia Park Road and an exit ramp from eastbound US 50 (John Hansen Highway). Columbia Park Road continues south as a county-maintained highway, crossing Amtrak's Northeast Corridor railroad line, MARC's Penn Line, and the Orange Line of the Washington Metro and passing the entrance to the Cheverly Metro Station before turning east through an industrial area. Just south of MD 459's southern terminus, there is a ramp from westbound Columbia Park Road to eastbound US 50. From its origin, MD 459 (Columbia Park Road) crosses US 50 then intersects both an entrance ramp to westbound US 50 and Cheverly Avenue, which passes through the heart of Cheverly. MD 459 turns west and passes through an industrial area as two-lane undivided Tuxedo Road. The old alignment of MD 459, MD 973 (Tuxedo Road), continues straight as the state highway parallels US 50 under the Alexandria Extension of CSX's Capital Subdivision railroad line. Tuxedo Road ends at an intersection with Kenilworth Avenue, which is the old alignment of MD 201, and ramps to and from US 50 west. MD 459 turns north onto Kenilworth Avenue, a divided highway with two lanes northbound. The state highway passes exit ramps from both directions of MD 201 before the southbound direction ends at Frolich Lane. MD 459 continues north as a single lane a short distance until that lane merges with northbound MD 201 (Kenilworth Avenue).

MD 459 is a part of the National Highway System as an intermodal connector for 0.02 miles (0.032 km) north from its southern terminus.

== History ==
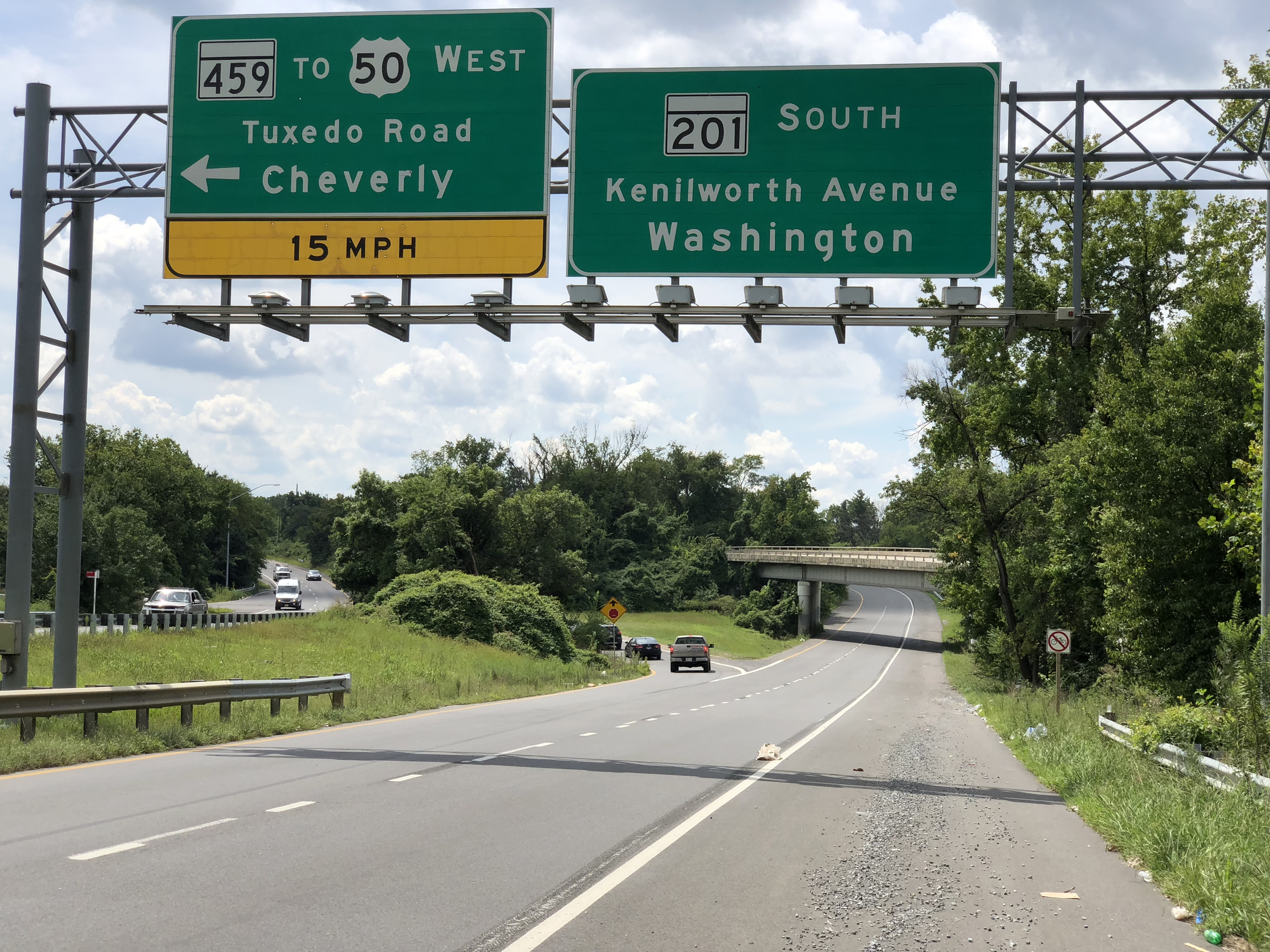
The MD 459 exit on southbound MD 201 in Tuxedo

The first part of modern MD 459 was the Kenilworth Avenue segment, which was built as a 15-to-18-foot-wide (4.6 to 5.5 m) concrete road as part of MD 201, then named River Road, in 1929. MD 459 proper was built in two sections starting in 1930. Tuxedo Road from MD 201 east to Columbia Park Road was constructed as a macadam road, and Cheverly Avenue from Columbia Park Road north through Cheverly to MD 202 was built as a concrete road; both roads were completed by 1933. Kenilworth Avenue was expanded to a divided highway between 1953 and 1956. When the relocation of MD 201 as a divided highway south of MD 459 was completed in 1957, MD 459 was extended to its present terminus. Construction of the Baltimore and Ohio Railroad's Alexandria Branch overpass of MD 459 and US 50 began in 1958 and was completed in 1959. MD 459 was relocated at the railroad crossing; part of the old alignment became MD 973. US 50 east of MD 201 was completed in 1962. The freeway's partial interchange with Columbia Park Road was open by 1965. MD 459 was removed from Cheverly Avenue and redirected to its present southern terminus in 1972.

== Major intersections ==
The entire route is in Prince George's County.

Location	mi	km	Destinations	Notes
Cheverly	0.00	0.00	Columbia Park Road	Continuation east
Cheverly	0.05	0.080	US 50 – Washington, Annapolis	Interchange; no northbound access to US 50 east
Tuxedo	0.94	1.51	US 50 west / MD 201 south (Kenilworth Avenue) to I-295 south – Washington, Alexandria	Interchange
Tuxedo	1.25	2.01	MD 201 north (Kenilworth Avenue) – Bladensburg	Northern terminus
1.000 mi = 1.609 km; 1.000 km = 0.621 mi: Incomplete access
