= Cheverly, Maryland =

Town in Prince George's County, Maryland, US

Cheverly
- Town
- Town of Cheverly
- Flag Seal

- Location of Cheverly in Prince George's County (left) and in Maryland (right)
- Coordinates: 38°55′28.12″N 76°54′48.56″W
- Country: United States
- State: Maryland
- County: Prince George's
- Incorporated: April 18, 1931

Government
  - Mayor: Micah Watson

Area
  - Total: 1.32 sq mi (3.41 km^{2})
  - Land: 1.32 sq mi (3.41 km^{2})
  - Water: 0 sq mi (0.00 km^{2})
- Elevation: 150 ft (46 m)

Population (2020)
  - Total: 6,170
  - Density: 4,683.1/sq mi (1,808.15/km^{2})
- Time zone: UTC-5 (EST)
  - Summer (DST): UTC-4 (EDT)
- ZIP Codes: 20784 & 20785
- Area codes: 301, 240
- FIPS code: 24-16550
- GNIS feature ID: 0597234
- Website: www.cheverly-md.gov

Cheverly is a town in Prince George's County, Maryland, United States, located very close to Washington, D.C., though not bordering it directly. The town was founded in 1918 and incorporated in 1931. Per the 2020 census, the population was 6,170. Cheverly borders the communities of Tuxedo, Chapel Oaks, Landover, Landover Hills, Villa Heights, and Bladensburg.

Cheverly is home to the Mount Hope, Prince George's County Health Department, Cheverly Professional Building, PepsiCo bottling plant, Judith P Hoyer Early Childhood Center, Cheverly American Legion Post 108, Magruder Spring Historic Landmark, ABC Supply Company Inc., Washington Woodworking Company, Cheverly Sport Fair Fishing Store, and Publick Playhouse Theater.

Until 2021, Cheverly had been home to the University of Maryland Prince George’s Hospital Center, which was founded in 1944 and was known as a first-class trauma center. The facility closed on June 12, 2021, replaced by the all-new, $543 million University of Maryland Capital Region Medical Center, which opened the same day in nearby Largo.

== History ==
=== 20th century ===
Cheverly was begun as a planned suburb in the early 1900s. The Cheverly area was first platted in 1904 for a 93-acre (380,000 m^{2}) community called Cheverly Gardens. The land was subsequently purchased in 1918 by Robert Marshall, president of the Washington Suburban Realty Company. The Cheverly subdivision platted by Marshall was developed around the 1839 Magruder family homestead known as Mount Hope. Marshall became the first resident of Cheverly by taking up residence in the restored homestead in 1919. In 1923, the first road, now known as Cheverly Avenue, was completed and paved to connect the Pennsylvania Railroad line to Landover Road. Thirty-four developer-built houses were constructed between 1921 and 1925. Most of the early houses were mail-order homes from Sears & Roebuck and the McClure Homes Company. Marshall lost control of the Washington Suburban Realty Company in 1927. Harry Wardman assumed the position until the company’s bankruptcy in 1929 due to the stock market crash.

Incorporation was granted in 1931 to address concerns for better roads and services. During the 1930s and 1940s, the streets were improved and lighting enhanced, and the number of residences increased from 135 to 650. Residential construction continued through the 1960s, creating a varied housing stock of early Cape Cod houses, with later ranch and split-level types. Two garden-style apartment complexes (Cheverly Terrace and Hanson Arms) were constructed in the early 1960s along Landover Road near the U.S. Route 50 interchange. The community center, town hall, and park facility was built in 1978. Industrial property was established in 1958 on the west side of town and adjacent to Route 50.

=== 21st century ===
On April 29, 2006, the community held a 75th anniversary celebration at the town community center. The historic home Mount Hope had been the town's official symbol since 1931, however, on June 11, 2020, the Mayor and Council voted unanimously to remove the home from the Town Seal and redesign it.

=== Historic sites ===
The following is a list of historic sites in Cheverly identified by the Maryland-National Capital Park and Planning Commission:

	Site Name	Image	Location	M-NCPPC Inventory Number	Comment
1	Raymond W. Bellamy House (Belmar)		2819 Cheverly Avenue	69-024-22	
2	Crawford’s Adventure Spring		In Cheverly Nature Park, West of Belleview Avenue	69-024-14	
3	The Magruder Spring		East of Cheverly Avenue and South of Arbor Street	69-024-13	
4	Mount Hope		1 Cheverly Circle	69-024-11	Listed on the National Register of Historic Places, 1978-11-29

== Geography ==
According to the United States Census Bureau, the town has a total area of 1.35 square miles (3.50 km^{2}), all land. It is at 38°55′28″N 76°54′49″W (38.924478, -76.913488).

While a majority of the homes in Cheverly are small to mid-sized red brick homes, there are a few apartment complexes. The names of these apartment complexes notably are:

- Cheverly Gardens Apartments; located at the intersection of Newton Street, Madison Way, and 55th Avenue
- Parke Cheverly Apartments; located directly south of the Cheverly Gardens Apartments at the intersections of 54th Avenue, Macbeth Street, and 55th Avenue
- Cheverly Station Apartments (formerly Cheverly Terrace Apartments); located at the intersection of Landover Road (MD 202) and Kilmer Street, facing the John Hanson Highway (U.S. Highway 50) directly east

=== Bordering areas ===
- Tuxedo (south and west)
- Chapel Oaks (southwest)
- Landover (east, northeast, and southeast)
- Landover Hills (north)
- Villa Heights (northwest)
- Bladensburg (northwest)

== Demographics ==
Historical population
Census	Pop.	Note	%±
1940	996		—
1950	3,318		233.1%
1960	5,223		57.4%
1970	6,808		30.3%
1980	5,751		−15.5%
1990	6,023		4.7%
2000	6,433		6.8%
2010	6,173		−4.0%
2020	6,170		0.0%
U.S. Decennial Census; 2010 2020

=== Racial and ethnic composition ===
Cheverly town, Maryland – Racial and ethnic composition Note: the US Census treats Hispanic/Latino as an ethnic category. This table excludes Latinos from the racial categories and assigns them to a separate category. Hispanics/Latinos may be of any race.
Race / Ethnicity (NH = Non-Hispanic)	Pop 2000	Pop 2010	Pop 2020	% 2000	% 2010	% 2020
White alone (NH)	2,003	1,752	1,929	31.14%	28.38%	31.26%
Black or African American alone (NH)	3,628	3,479	2,871	56.40%	56.36%	46.53%
Native American or Alaska Native alone (NH)	6	6	7	0.09%	0.10%	0.11%
Asian alone (NH)	161	101	144	2.50%	1.64%	2.33%
Native Hawaiian or Pacific Islander alone (NH)	2	0	4	0.03%	0.00%	0.06%
Other race alone (NH)	13	24	28	0.20%	0.39%	0.45%
Mixed race or Multiracial (NH)	185	160	312	2.88%	2.59%	5.06%
Hispanic or Latino (any race)	435	651	875	6.76%	10.55%	14.18%
Total	6,433	6,173	6,170	100.00%	100.00%	100.00%

=== 2020 census ===
As of the 2020 census, Cheverly had a population of 6,170. The median age was 39.3 years. 23.2% of residents were under the age of 18 and 15.5% were 65 years of age or older. For every 100 females there were 94.5 males, and for every 100 females age 18 and over there were 89.3 males age 18 and over.

100.0% of residents lived in urban areas, while 0.0% lived in rural areas.

There were 2,278 households, of which 36.0% had children under the age of 18 living in them. Of all households, 48.2% were married-couple households, 17.5% were households with a male householder and no spouse or partner present, and 28.7% were households with a female householder and no spouse or partner present. About 24.5% of all households were made up of individuals, and 9.4% had someone living alone who was 65 years of age or older.

There were 2,380 housing units, of which 4.3% were vacant. The homeowner vacancy rate was 1.3% and the rental vacancy rate was 6.0%.

=== 2010 census ===
As of the census of 2010, there were 6,173 people, 2,287 households, and 1,568 families living in the town. The population density was 4,572.6 inhabitants per square mile (1,765.5/km^{2}). There were 2,395 housing units at an average density of 1,774.1 per square mile (685.0/km^{2}). The racial makeup of the town was 32.4% White, 57.1% African American, 0.1% Native American, 1.7% Asian, 5.3% from other races, and 3.4% from two or more races. Hispanic or Latino of any race were 10.5% of the population.

There were 2,287 households, of which 36.3% had children under the age of 18 living with them, 44.3% were married couples living together, 17.6% had a female householder with no husband present, 6.6% had a male householder with no wife present, and 31.4% were non-families. 23.6% of all households were made up of individuals, and 4.5% had someone living alone who was 65 years of age or older. The average household size was 2.69 and the average family size was 3.17.

The median age in the town was 37.8 years. 23.6% of residents were under the age of 18; 8.5% were between the ages of 18 and 24; 28.7% were from 25 to 44; 30.6% were from 45 to 64; and 8.5% were 65 years of age or older. The gender makeup of the town was 50.6% male and 49.4% female.

=== 2000 census ===
As of the census of 2000, there were 6,433 people, 2,258 households, and 1,637 families living in the town. The population density was 4,769.9 inhabitants per square mile (1,841.7/km^{2}). There were 2,348 housing units at an average density of 1,741.0 per square mile (672.2/km^{2}). The racial makeup of the town was 56.79% African American, 33.86% White, 6.76% Hispanic or Latino of any race, 3.44% from two or more races, 3.22% from other races, 2.50% Asian, 0.17% Native American, and 0.03% Pacific Islander.

There were 2,258 households, out of which 39.8% had children under the age of 18 living with them, 48.8% were married couples living together, 17.1% had a female householder with no husband present, and 27.5% were non-families. 20.4% of all households were made up of individuals, and 4.7% had someone living alone who was 65 years of age or older. The average household size was 2.85 and the average family size was 3.30.

In the town, the population was spread out, with 28.5% under the age of 18, 7.6% from 18 to 24, 31.7% from 25 to 44, 24.2% from 45 to 64, and 8.0% who were 65 years of age or older. The median age was 36 years. For every 100 females, there were 94.9 males. For every 100 females age 18 and over, there were 89.3 males.

The median income for a household in the town was $65,431, and the median income for a family was $67,540. Males had a median income of $39,237 versus $36,757 for females. The per capita income for the town was $24,096. About 4.9% of families and 6.8% of the population were below the poverty line, including 9.7% of those under age 18 and 4.1% of those age 65 or over.

=== Income and poverty ===
As of the American Community Survey of 2013, the median income for a household in the town was $95,274, and the median income for a family was $112,353. The median income for married-couple families was $123,218, and the median income for non-family households was $54,079.

== Government ==
The Town of Cheverly has a Mayor who is elected every three years. There are 6 wards, and one council member for each ward is elected every two years. The Vice Mayor is selected by the Mayor & Council within the first month of a new term. Elections are on the first Monday of May, and the newly elected are sworn in at the May Town Meeting on the 2nd Thursday of the Month.

The current elected Mayor and Council are: Mayor Micah Watson (elected in 2025), Council Member Christopher Wade (Ward 1), Council Member John LeGloahec (Ward 2), Council Member Nicole Bryner (Ward 3 and Vice Mayor), Council Member David Tansey (Ward 4), Council Member Charly Garces (Ward 5), and Council Member Amy Jean Chung Fry (Ward 6). The council body was elected in 2025.

Cheverly residents 16 years of age and older, regardless of citizenship, can vote in local elections.

== Transportation ==
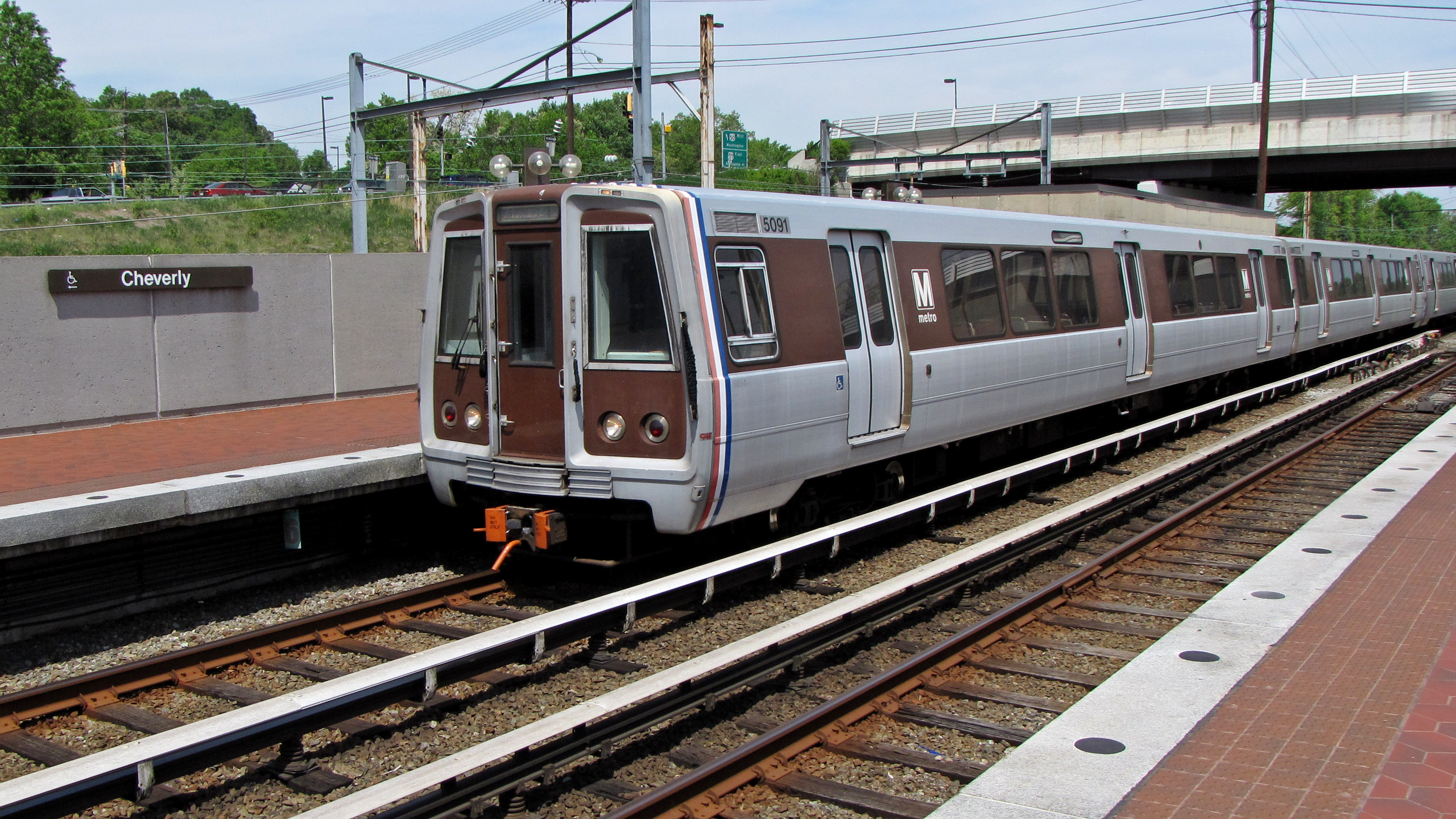
A Metro train at the Cheverly Station

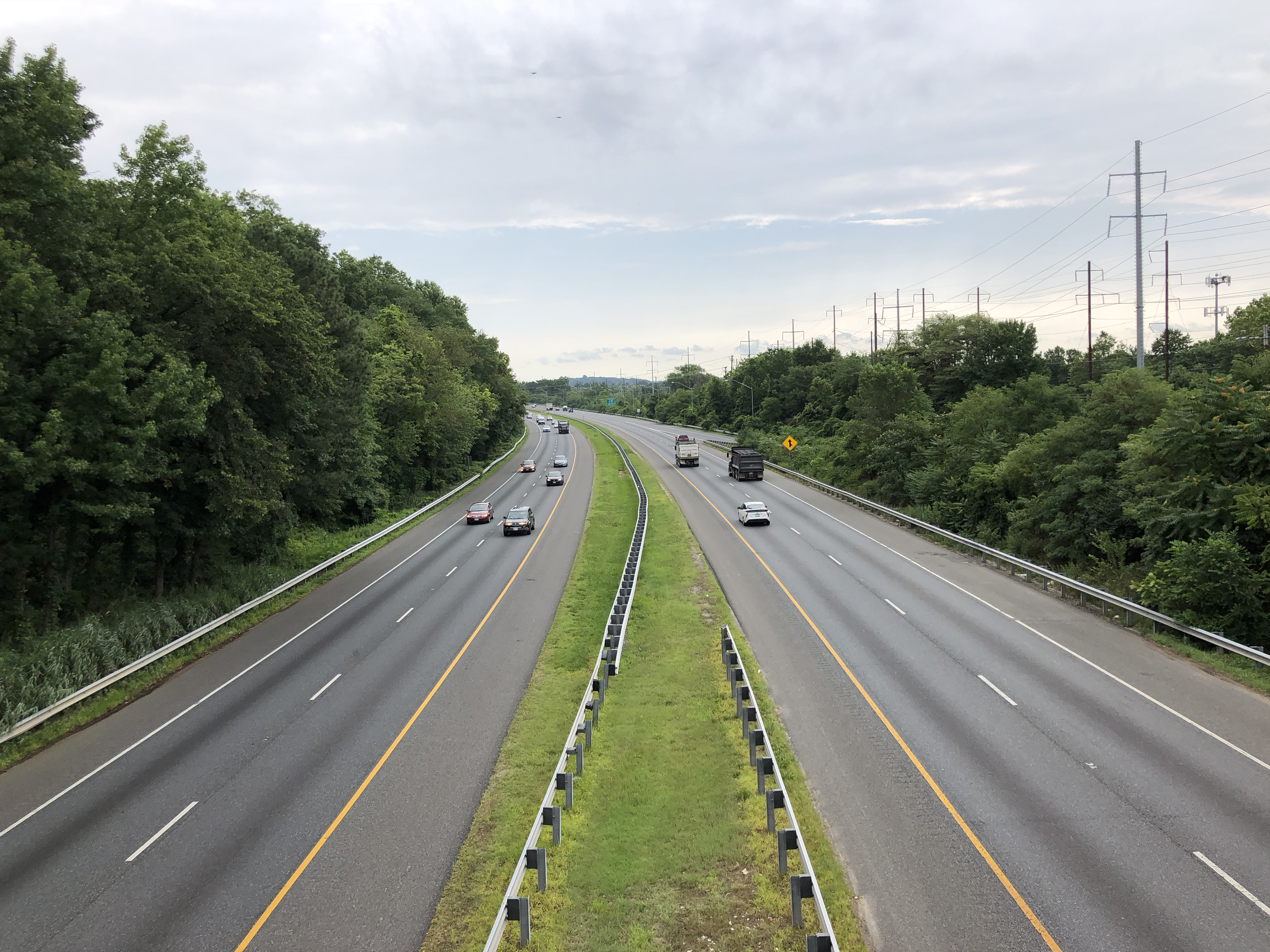
View east along US 50 from the overpass for MD 459 in Cheverly

The major freeways serving Cheverly are U.S. Route 50, which skims the southern edge of town, and the Baltimore-Washington Parkway, which brushes the west side of town. Both roads have interchanges with Maryland Route 202, which is the main at-grade highway crossing the town. In addition, Maryland Route 459 (known as Tuxedo Road for most of its length) serves as a connector between US 50 on the south side of town and Maryland Route 201 just west of the town.

The Cheverly station on the Metro Orange Line is located in Cheverly just south of Route 50.

== Education ==
Cheverly is served by the Prince George's County Public Schools system.

Public schools serving Cheverly include:

- Elementary schools: Gladys Noon Spellman serves most of Cheverly, with small portions zoned to Bladensburg and Robert Gray
- Most residents are zoned to G. James Gholson Middle School, with some zoned to William Wirt Middle School
- Most residents are zoned to Bladensburg High School, with a small number zoned to Fairmont Heights High School.

Judith P. Hoyer Early Childhood Center is also in Cheverly.

Private schools:

- Saint Ambrose Catholic School (6310 Jason Street)

== Parks and recreation ==
- Bellamy Park: a memorial to Raymond Bellamy Sr. (Forest Road & Cheverly Avenue)
- Boyd Park: playground, basketball courts, ball fields, tennis courts, barbecue grills, a 3-acre (12,000 m^{2}) nature/fitness trail with exercise equipment stations, and pavilion (available for reservation by residents only at the Town office.) (State Street and 64th Avenue)
- Cheverly-East Neighborhood Park: playground, basketball courts, ball fields, tennis court. M-NCPPC Department of Parks and Recreation facility (6600 block of Oak Street)
- Cheverly-Euclid Neighborhood Park (informally known as Pool Park): playground, basketball courts, ball fields, tennis courts. M-NCPPC Department of Parks and Recreation facility (Euclid Street & Crest Avenue)
- Cheverly Swim and Racquet Club: private club with swimming pool and tennis courts, both clay and har-tru. (Euclid Street & Crest Avenue)
- Cheverly-Tuxedo Park: playground, basketball courts, soccer field, softball field and picnic tables. (Belleview Avenue & Arbor Street)
- Gast Park (Tot Lot/Cheese Park): playground. (Parkway & Inwood Street) NO DOGS ALLOWED.
- Legion Park: memorial to those who died in military service. (Forest Road and Cheverly Avenue)
- Magruder Spring Park: location of Magruder Spring, also known as Cheverly Spring. These springs were used by the British in 1814 as they marched on Washington. Both were designated in 1980 as Prince George's County Historic Resources. (Cheverly Avenue & Arbor Street)
- Nature Park: woodland area containing Crawford's Adventure Spring. These springs were used by the British in 1814 as they marched on Washington. Both were designated in 1980 as Prince George's County Historic Resources. (Crest Avenue & Lockwood Road)
- Town Park: playground, ball fields, basketball courts, tennis courts, barbecue grills, and pavilion (available for reservation by residents only at the town office). (6401 Forest Road)
- Woodworth Park: playground, nature trail. (Wayne Place & Cheverly Park Drive)

== Notable people ==
- Tobi Adewole, professional soccer player
- Rushern Baker, former Prince George's County executive
- Michael Beasley, professional basketball player
- Gabrielle Christian, film and television actress
- Wayne Curry, former Prince George's County executive
- Steve Farr, former baseball pitcher
- Jeff Green, professional basketball player
- Glenn Ivey, U.S. congressman for Maryland's 4th congressional district, former Maryland State's Attorney, spouse of Jolene
- Jolene Ivey, Prince George's County Councilmember, former Maryland State Delegate, spouse of Glenn
- Julian Ivey, Maryland State Delegate, DNC Delegate for Bernie Sanders, Cheverly Town Council Person
- Jason C. Miller, musician and voice actor
- Margaret Pittman, NIH researcher on typhoid, cholera, and pertussis vaccines
- Tim Miles, basketball coach
- Victor R. Ramirez, former Maryland State Senator
- Charles M. Robinson, producer and director
- Andrea Seabrook, National Public Radio reporter
- Gladys Spellman, U.S. congresswoman
- Angela Stanton-King, American author, television personality, and motivational speaker
- Substantial, rapper
- Michael G. Summers, former Maryland State Delegate
- Michael Taylor, professional baseball player
- David Trone, U.S. representative for Maryland
- Lexi Underwood, actress in Little Fires Everywhere, as Pearl Warren
