= Riverdale Park, Maryland =

Town in Prince George's County, Maryland, US

- Town
- Flag Seal

- Coordinates: 38°57′46″N 76°55′47″W
- Country: United States
- State: Maryland
- County: Prince George's
- Incorporated: 1920 (as Riverdale)

Area
  - Total: 1.61 sq mi (4.16 km^{2})
  - Land: 1.58 sq mi (4.09 km^{2})
  - Water: 0.027 sq mi (0.07 km^{2})
- Elevation: 39 ft (12 m)

Population (2020)
  - Total: 7,351
  - Density: 4,656.0/sq mi (1,797.68/km^{2})
- Time zone: UTC-5 (Eastern (EST))
  - Summer (DST): UTC-4 (EDT)
- Area codes: 301, 240
- FIPS code: 24-66635
- GNIS feature ID: 0597960
- Website: riverdaleparkmd.info

Riverdale Park, formerly known and often referred to as Riverdale, is a semi-urban town in Prince George's County, Maryland, United States, a suburb in the Washington, D.C., metropolitan area. The population was 7,351 as of the 2020 census.

== History ==
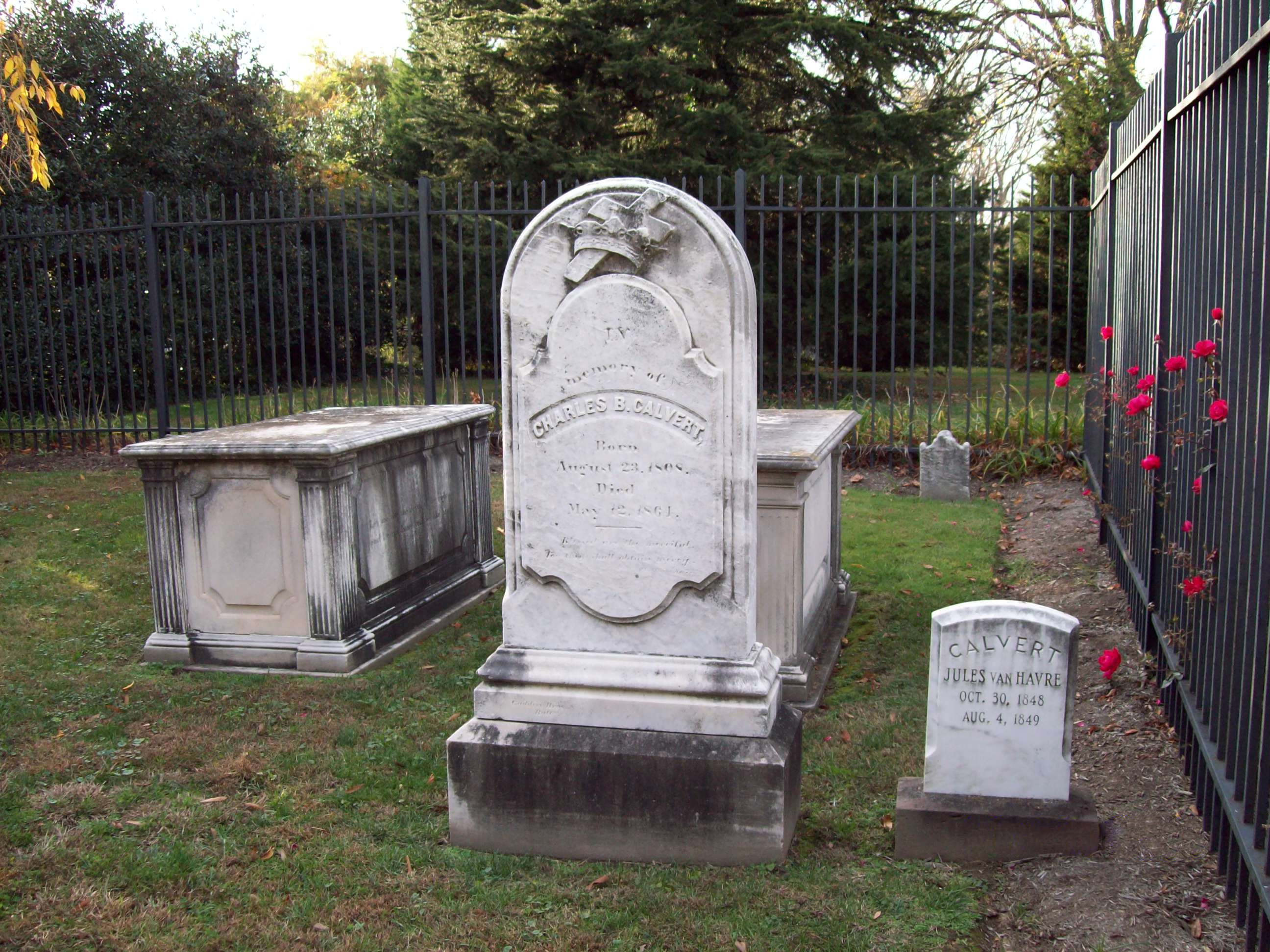
Historic Calvert Cemetery in Riverdale, the original Calverts were the first leaders of the Maryland colony, in St. Mary's City, Maryland, this gravestone is of one of their descendants in the 1800s who lived in Riverdale. The Calverts were still an influential family at that time and were very influential in historic Riverdale. Nov 2008

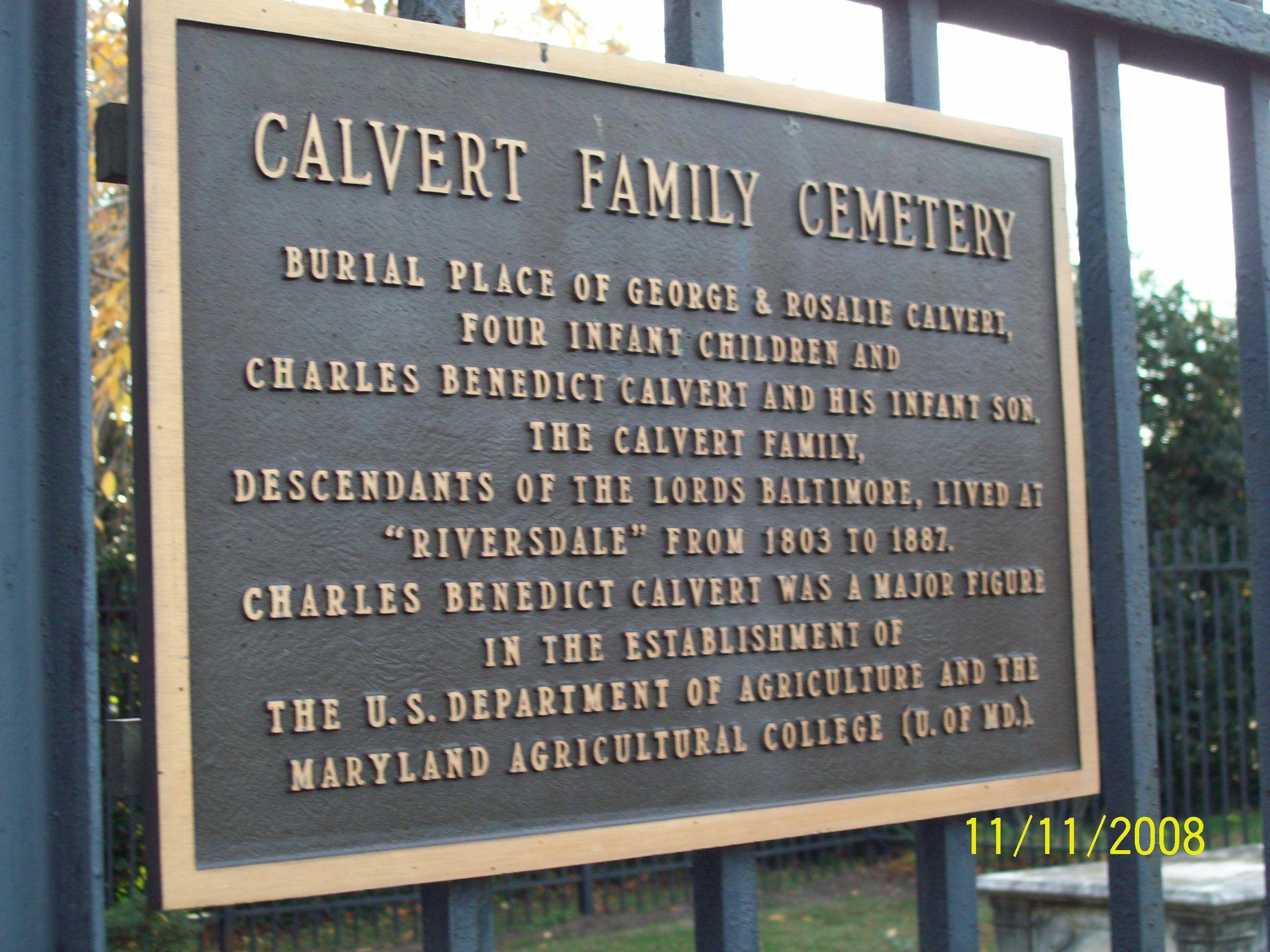
Calvert Cemetery plaque in Riverdale, Maryland, one of the founders of what is now the University of Maryland, College Park. Nov 2008

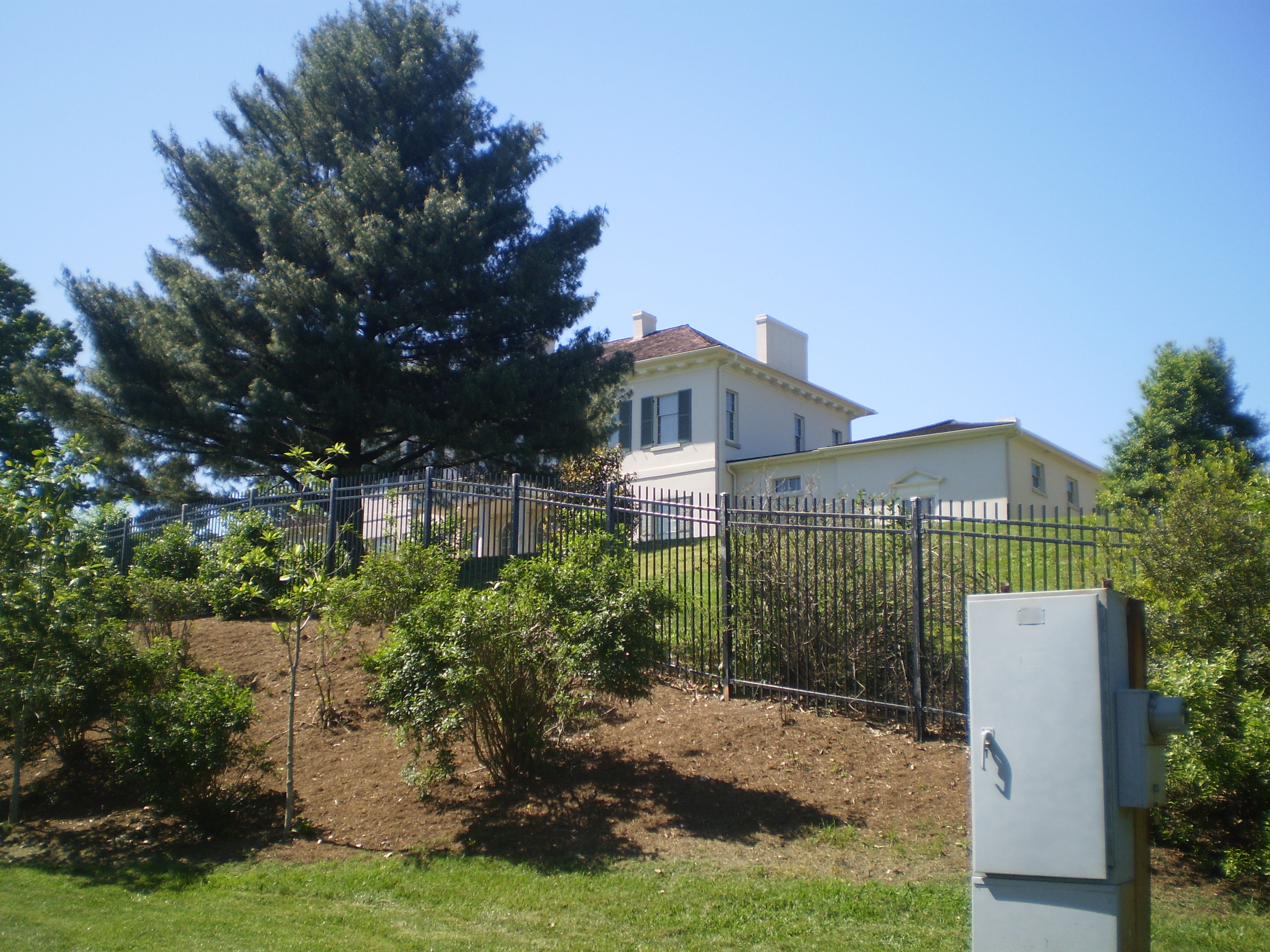
Riverdale House Museum, showcases life in historic Riverdale, Maryland. Ben Jacobson (Kranar Drogin)

Riverdale Park and the neighboring community of West Riverdale developed in the late 19th century as streetcar suburbs in central Prince George's County. The town is located approximately seven miles northeast of downtown Washington, D.C. The area is also bisected by the heavily traveled Baltimore Avenue (U.S. Route 1). The city of College Park is located to the north, the town of University Park to the west across Baltimore Avenue, the town of Edmonston to the east and southeast, and Hyattsville is located to the south and southwest.

=== Founding ===
The area was first developed in 1801 when a Belgian aristocrat, Henri Joseph Stier, purchased 800 acres situated between two tributaries of the Anacostia River, known as the Paint and Northwest branches. Stier and his family moved to the United States several years earlier to escape the French Revolution (1788–1789). Upon purchase, he named his holdings Riversdale, and began constructing his residence that same year. The mansion was modeled after the Stier family's Belgian home, Chateau du Mick, and when completed in 1807, the building stood as a two-story stuccoed-brick dwelling in the style of late Georgian architecture.

Just two years after purchasing the property, in 1803, the political tension that had caused Stier to flee his native country subsided, and he and his wife, Marie Louise, returned to Belgium. Riversdale was given to their daughter, Rosalie, who had married George Calvert, the grandson of Charles Calvert, 5th Baron Baltimore, in 1799. After Rosalie Stier Calvert died in 1821 and George Calvert in 1838, their son, Charles Benedict Calvert, took over the plantation. Charles Calvert was a renowned agriculturist and helped establish the Maryland Agricultural College, now the University of Maryland at College Park. In May 1853, Calvert announced he would donate land for an agricultural college. In 1861, Calvert was elected to the United States Congress and fought for the establishment of the United States Department of Agriculture. During his life, Charles Calvert conducted a variety of agricultural experiments at Riversdale, and expanded his family's original holdings to 2,200 acres. Calvert died in 1864; however, the property remained in the ownership of the Calvert family for another twenty years.

The 1861 Martenet map depicts the rural setting of Riversdale and identifies Charles B. Calvert as its owner. The old Baltimore Turnpike, now known as US Route 1, is located to the west of the mansion house. To the east of the house is the Washington Branch of the Baltimore & Ohio Railroad, which opened in 1833. The railway is located inside the boundaries of Riverdale Park, just west of the Paint Branch tributary. The 1878 Hopkins map depicts little development having had happened since 1861.

=== Post-Calverts ===
In 1887, the heirs of Charles Benedict Calvert sold 474 acres of land to New York City businessmen John Fox and Alexander Lutz in two separate transactions. The first deed involved the sale of 300 acres, which included the Riversdale mansion. The remaining 174 acres were transferred to Fox and Lutz shortly thereafter. The cost of the sales to Fox and Lutz totaled $47,000. On March 23, 1889, Fox and Lutz formed the Riverdale Park Company, which was named in honor of the grand Federal style mansion at the center of the proposed community. The company planned on creating an upper-middle-class residential suburb for people working in Washington, D.C., and Baltimore.

The land was platted in 1889 by surveyor D.J. Howell and the new development was named Riverdale Park. In an attempt to differentiate the historic plantation known as Riversdale from the subdivision, the "s" was dropped. The new roads were named in honor of United States presidents and were arranged in a grid pattern that surrounded a central ellipse, which served as the site of the commuter train station. The first of the stations was constructed in 1890. Laid out as a "villa park", the community featured traffic circles and green space, with the mansion being used as its central amenity. The three original sections of the suburb used relatively uniform lot dimensions and building setbacks, thereby creating a cohesive development of middle- and upper-middle-class housing. The residential housing lots surrounded the high-style Riversdale mansion.

=== Growth ===
The construction of dwellings in Riverdale Park began in 1890. The buildings reflected popular architectural trends of the time and were of wood-frame construction. Some structures were pyramidal-roof Foursquares, while others had front-gable or cross-gable roofs. Many houses from this period have projecting bays, corner towers, and wrap-around porches. By the turn of the twentieth century, Riverdale Park comprised 60 dwellings, a Presbyterian church, a schoolhouse, and a railroad station. The new community straddled the Washington line of the Baltimore & Ohio Railroad, which provided residents an easy commute to Washington, D.C.

Recognizing the financial potential of the new suburb, builders purchased groups of lots that were soon improved by high-style single-family dwellings. Joseph A. Blundon (ca. 1847–1909) was one such late-nineteenth-century builder. Born in Georgetown, Blundon worked as a general contractor in Washington, D.C., before moving to Riverdale Park in 1889. He was instrumental in forming the Riverdale Park Company and served as its first manager. Blundon also, independent of the development company, purchased several lots each year for the purpose of overseeing the construction of single-family dwellings. Between 1891 and 1909, he was responsible for the erection of roughly 90 buildings in Riverdale Park. Accordingly, he became known as the "Father of Riverdale".

In 1920, a handful of owners in both Riverdale Park and the nearby West Riverdale petitioned the Maryland General Assembly requesting authority to incorporate the two neighborhoods as a municipality. On June 14, 1920, the two communities were incorporated as the Town of Riverdale. As a result of the transfer of power from the Riverdale Park Company to the municipal government, the importance of the real estate company began to diminish, prompting a financial strain. Within ten years of the town's incorporation, the Riverdale Park Company went bankrupt.

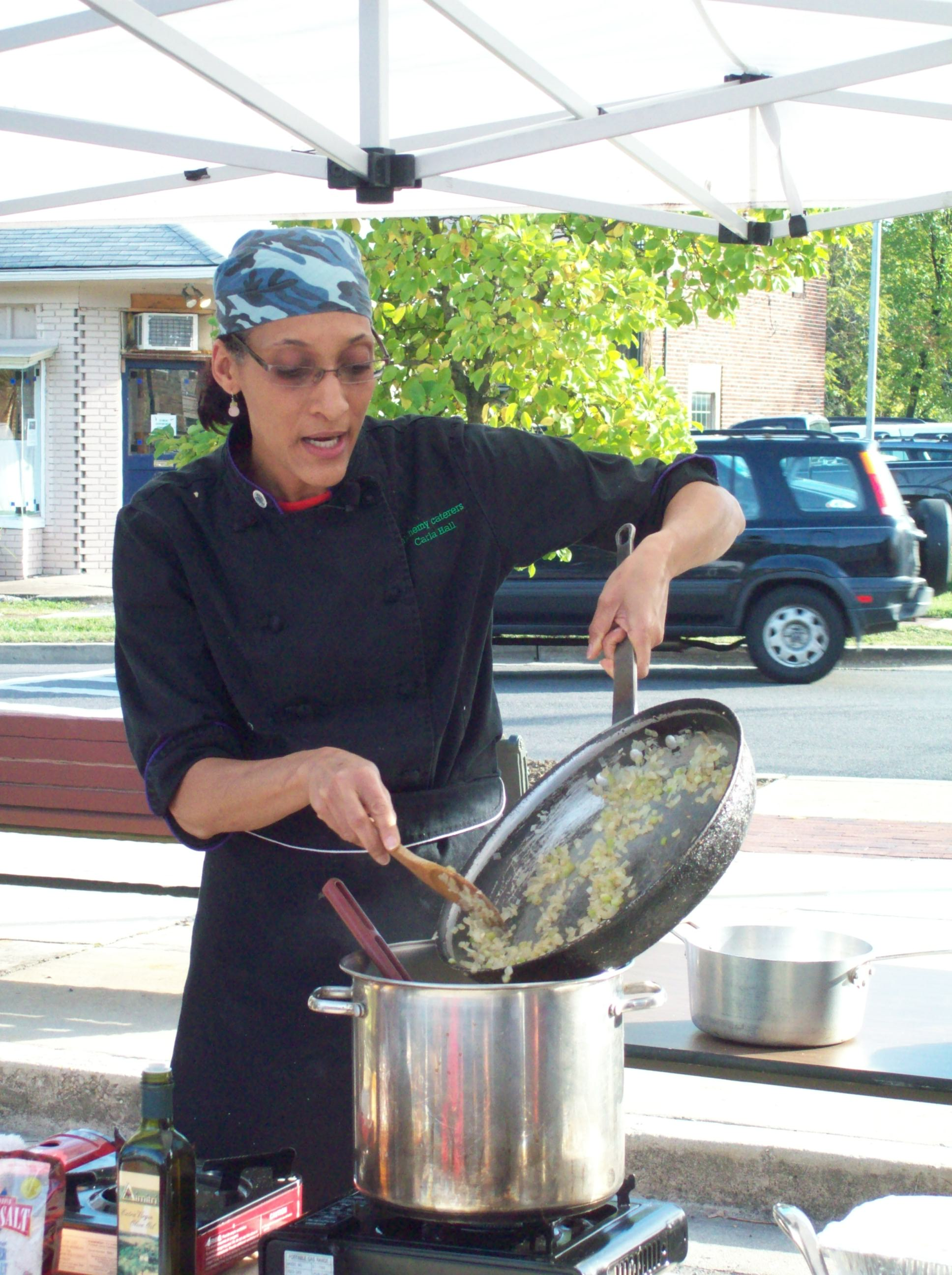
Carla Hall preparing gourmet natural food at the Riverdale Park Farmers Market, October 2009

Numerous annexations in the mid-twentieth century increased Riverdale's overall size. The municipal government continued to grow and change during this period. In 1941, the town changed the name of its roads to conform to the standards of the United States Postal Service, carrying a similar pattern as those of Washington, D.C., and nearby College Park. The increasing population and commercial and governmental growth of metropolitan Washington, D.C., most notably during the last twenty years of the twentieth century, has resulted in further development of the town of Riverdale. This late-twentieth-century growth was predominantly commercial and centered along Baltimore Avenue, thereby physically and visually separating West Riverdale from Riverdale Park.

=== Post-1940s ===
Since the 1940s, the area has been a largely blue-collar town predominated by small red brick or wooden homes with porches. The area has always had a large presence of University of Maryland students, faculty, and staff residents. It also has a large and growing, professional, middle-class African American population.

The area originally had its own small town Maryland identity, but was eventually engulfed by post-World War II urban expansion, related to the growth of the University of Maryland and Washington D.C. The area is now much more of a neighborhood than an actual town. Although many of the original residents have left, there are still a significant number of original residents living in the area. Many of the original residents speak with classic Maryland accents, which has some similarities to a Baltimore accent. Washington, D.C., and its close northern and northwestern suburbs once had large blue-collar Irish populations some of this influence is still evident in the remnants of the older community.

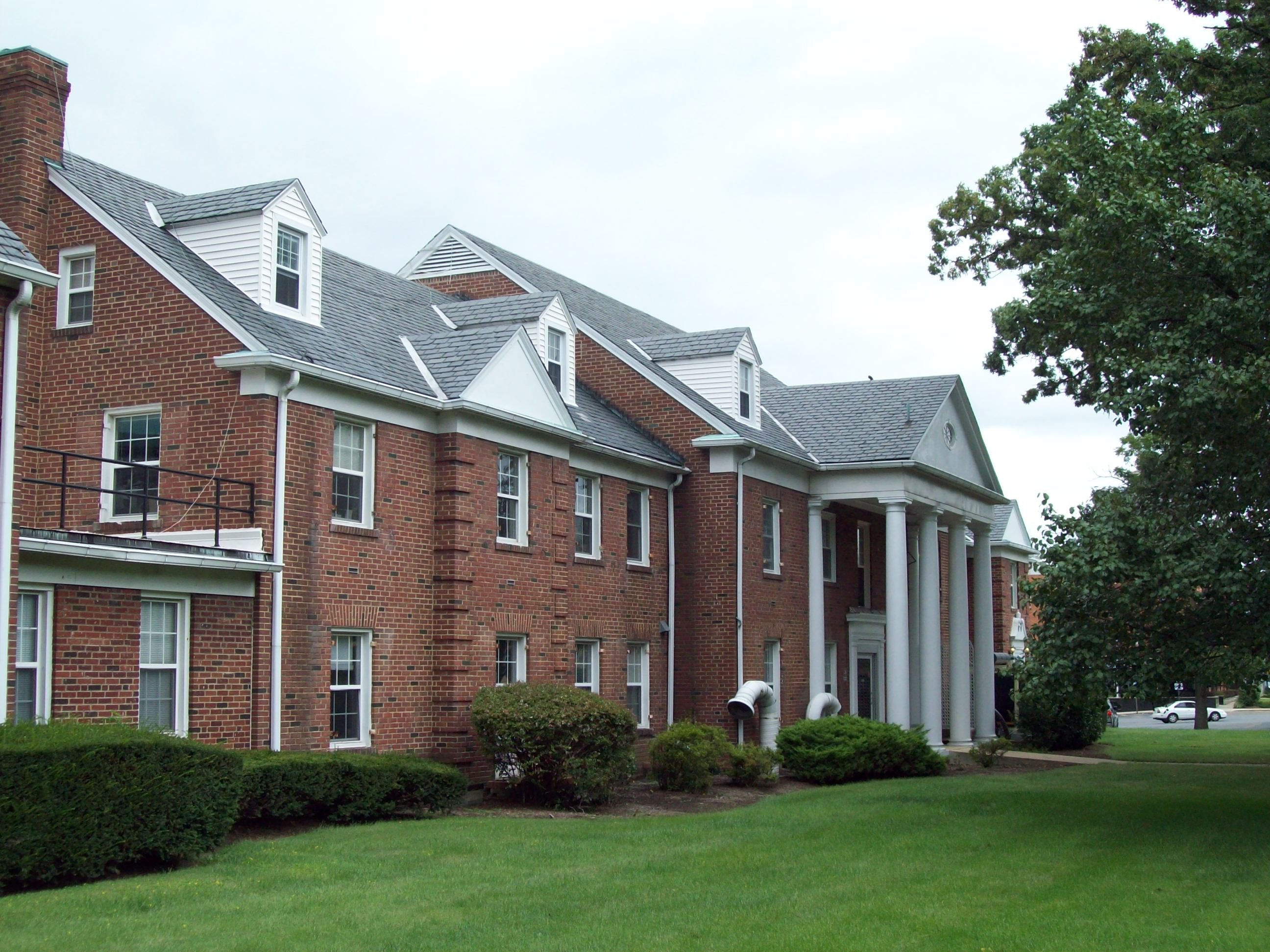
former Leland Memorial Hospital, historic architecture in Riverdale, Maryland. September 2009

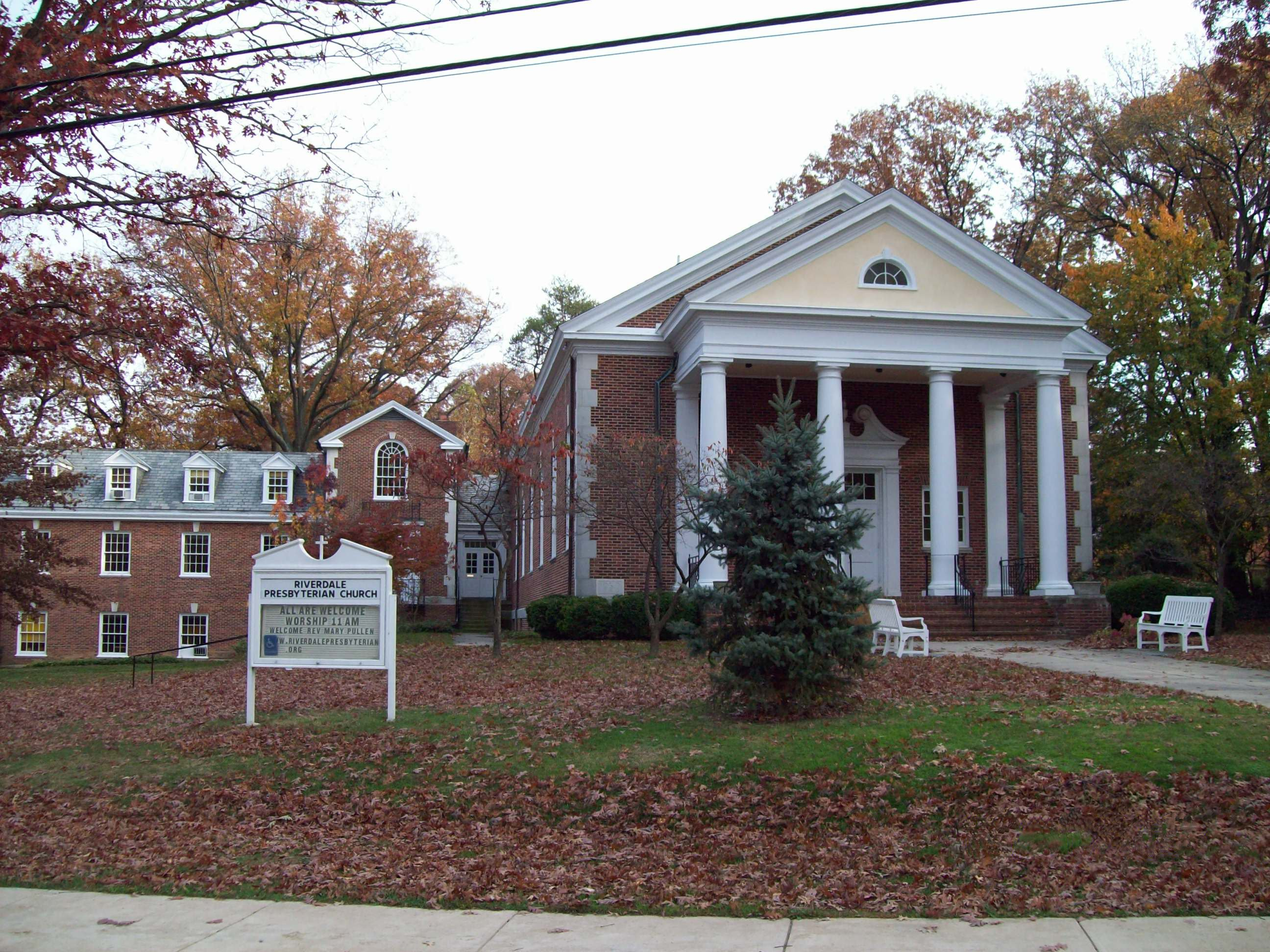
Historic Riverdale Presbyterian Church Nov 8

In 1998, the town was officially renamed Riverdale Park. Today, the town is made up of a mix of housing styles, including 1960s apartment buildings, pre- and post-World War II era buildings, and dwellings from the turn of the twentieth century. The Riversdale mansion, now surrounded by eight acres, is owned by the M-NCPPC, which purchased it in 1949. The Riversdale property is bounded roughly by 48th Avenue to the west, Riverdale Road to the north, Taylor Street to the east, and Oglethorpe Street to the south.

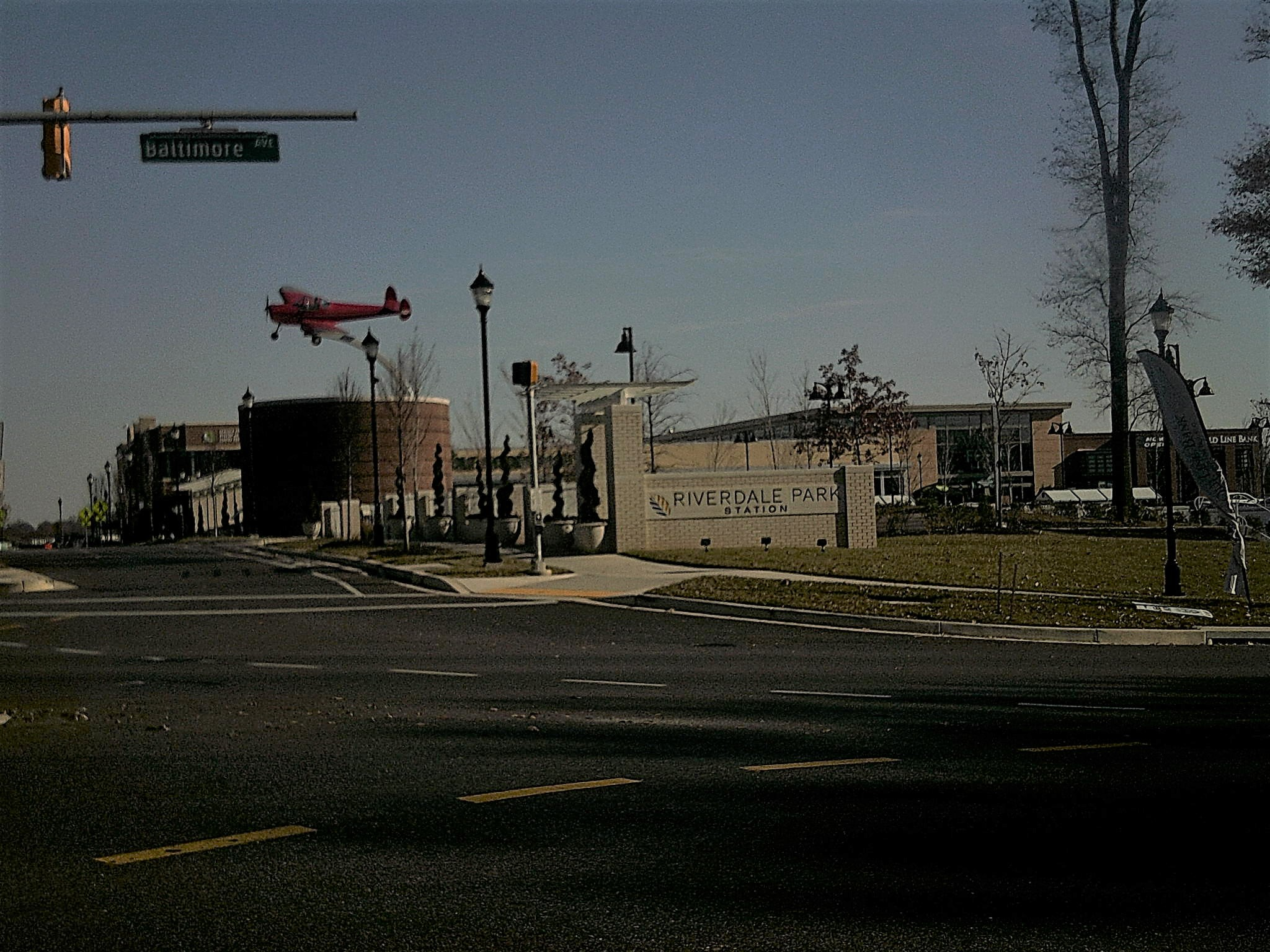
Riverdale Park Station, a mixed use development, located at the intersection of Baltimore Avenue (6700 block) and Van Buren Street, opened in April 2017

In 2015, construction began on the Cafritz Property, the largest piece of undeveloped property in Prince George's County. In April 2017, it opened as Riverdale Park Station, a mixed-use development located at the odd side of the 6600 to 6700 blocks on Baltimore Avenue. A major tenant of the development is the Whole Foods Market, the first to open in Prince George's County.

== Demographics ==
Historical population
Census	Pop.	Note	%±
1930	1,533		—
1940	2,330		52.0%
1950	5,530		137.3%
1960	4,389		−20.6%
1970	5,724		30.4%
1980	4,761		−16.8%
1990	5,185		8.9%
2000	6,690		29.0%
2010	6,956		4.0%
2020	7,351		5.7%
U.S. Decennial Census

=== Racial and ethnic composition ===
Riverdale Park town, Maryland – Racial and ethnic composition Note: the US Census treats Hispanic/Latino as an ethnic category. This table excludes Latinos from the racial categories and assigns them to a separate category. Hispanics/Latinos may be of any race.
Race / Ethnicity (NH = Non-Hispanic)	Pop 2000	Pop 2010	Pop 2020	% 2000	% 2010	% 2020
White alone (NH)	1,832	1,224	1,205	27.38%	17.60%	16.39%
Black or African American alone (NH)	2,532	1,838	1,508	37.85%	26.42%	20.51%
Native American or Alaska Native alone (NH)	15	21	9	0.22%	0.30%	0.12%
Asian alone (NH)	261	231	352	3.90%	3.32%	4.79%
Native Hawaiian or Pacific Islander alone (NH)	1	5	0	0.01%	0.07%	0.00%
Other race alone (NH)	14	28	51	0.21%	0.40%	0.69%
Mixed race or Multiracial (NH)	144	129	175	2.15%	1.85%	2.38%
Hispanic or Latino (any race)	1,891	3,480	4,051	28.27%	50.03%	55.11%
Total	6,690	6,956	7,351	100.00%	100.00%	100.00%

=== 2020 census ===
As of the 2020 census, Riverdale Park had a population of 7,351. The median age was 33.0 years. 27.0% of residents were under the age of 18 and 8.7% were 65 years of age or older. For every 100 females, there were 106.8 males, and for every 100 females age 18 and over, there were 105.2 males age 18 and over.

100.0% of residents lived in urban areas, while 0.0% lived in rural areas.

There were 2,129 households in Riverdale Park, of which 46.2% had children under the age of 18 living in them. Of all households, 47.1% were married-couple households, 19.7% were households with a male householder and no spouse or partner present, and 24.3% were households with a female householder and no spouse or partner present. About 17.5% of all households were made up of individuals and 4.8% had someone living alone who was 65 years of age or older.

There were 2,215 housing units, of which 3.9% were vacant. The homeowner vacancy rate was 0.7% and the rental vacancy rate was 3.3%.

=== 2010 census ===
As of the 2010 Census, there were 6,956 people, 1,944 households, and 1,390 families residing in the town. The population density was 4,215.8 inhabitants per square mile (1,627.7/km^{2}). There were 2,058 housing units at an average density of 1,247.3 per square mile (481.6/km^{2}). The racial makeup of the town was 32.2% White, 27.1% African American, 1.3% Native American, 3.3% Asian, 0.1% Pacific Islander, 32.0% from other races, and 3.9% from two or more races. Hispanic or Latino of any race were 50.0% of the population.

There were 1,944 households in the town, of which 46.3% had children under the age of 18 living with them, 44.7% were married couples living together, 16.6% contained a female member with no husband present, 10.3% contained a male member with no wife present, and 28.5% were non-families. 18.7% of all households were made up of individuals, and 4.8% contained someone living alone who was 65 years of age or older. The average household size was 3.50 and the average family size was 3.85.

The median age in the town was 30.3 years. 27.7% of residents were under the age of 18; 11.7% were between the ages of 18 and 24; 33.8% were between 25 and 44; 19.8% were between 45 and 64; and 6.7% were 65 years of age or older. The gender makeup of the town was 52.9% male and 47.1% female.

=== 2000 census ===
As of the census of 2000, there were 6,690 people, 2,172 households, and 1,437 families residing in the town. The population density was 4,212.7 inhabitants per square mile (1,626.5/km^{2}). There were 2,321 housing units at an average density of 1,461.5 per square mile (564.3/km^{2}). The racial makeup of the town was 39.91% White, 38.51% African American, 0.49% Native American, 4.25% Asian, 0.12% Pacific Islander, 12.99% from other races, and 3.74% from two or more races. Hispanic or Latino of any race were 28.27% of the population.

There were 2,172 households, out of which 38.4% had children under the age of 18 living with them, 42.0% were married couples living together, 16.4% contained a female member with no husband present, and 33.8% were non-families. 23.9% of all households were made up of individuals, and 4.1% contained someone living alone who was 65 years of age or older. The average household size was 3.06 and the average family size was 3.60.

28.7% of residents were under the age of 18;12.2% were between 18 and 24, 38.7% between 25 and 44, 15.6% between 45 and 64, and 4.9% were 65 years of age or older. The median age was 29 years. For every 100 females, there were 110.6 males. For every 100 females age 18 and over, there were 109.3 males.

The median income for a household in the town was $44,041, and the median income for a family was $49,904. Males had a median income of $30,053 versus $30,200 for females. The per capita income for the town was $19,293. About 9.0% of families and 12.0% of the population were below the poverty line, including 16.0% of those under age 18 and 7.2% of those age 65 or over.

== Government ==
Municipal building for Riverdale Park

In 2016, the town changed its form of government to include a town manager. The town is governed by a mayor and town council. The council has six members, each representing a different ward of the town. As of the 2023 general election, the mayor of Riverdale Park is Alan K. Thompson and the wards are represented as below:

- Ward One – Richard Smith
- Ward Two – Aaron Faulx
- Ward Three – David Lingua
- Ward Four – Ifiok Inyang
- Ward Five – Karen Mejia
- Ward Six – Foday Kallon

The town has its own police department, with Rosa Guixens serving as the chief of police.

Riverdale Park and the adjacent, unincorporated community of Riverdale Heights are served by two primarily volunteer fire departments within the Prince George's Fire and EMS Department. "Riverdale 7" and "Riverdale Heights 13" both provide services to the community with volunteer firefighters and a staff of live-in volunteers.

Prince George's County Police Department District 1 Station in Hyattsville serves Riverdale Park.

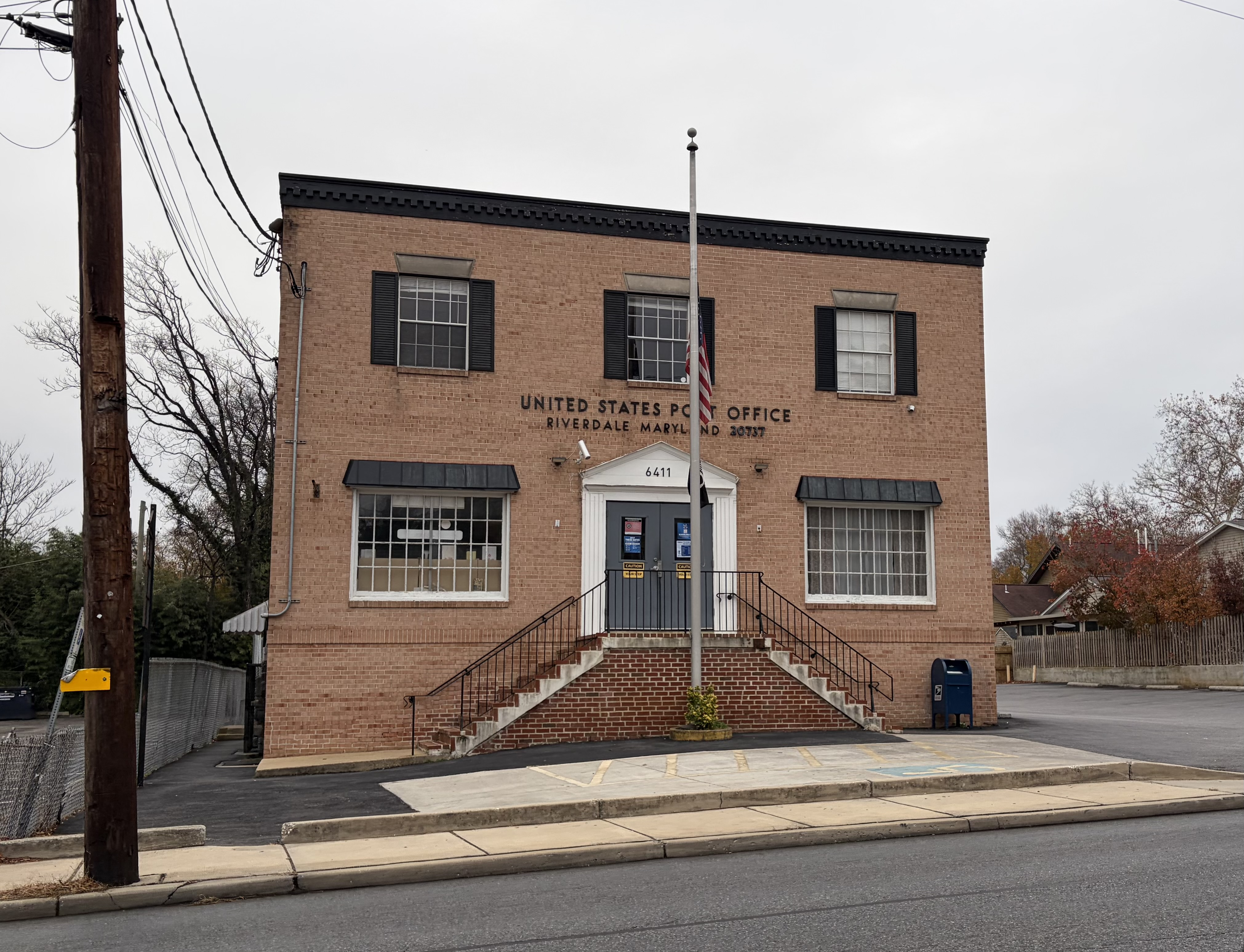
The Riverdale Park Post Office

The United States Postal Service operates the Riverdale Post Office and the Kenilworth Post Office in Riverdale Park. The Calvert Carrier Annex has a Hyattsville address but is physically in Riverdale Park.

== Education ==
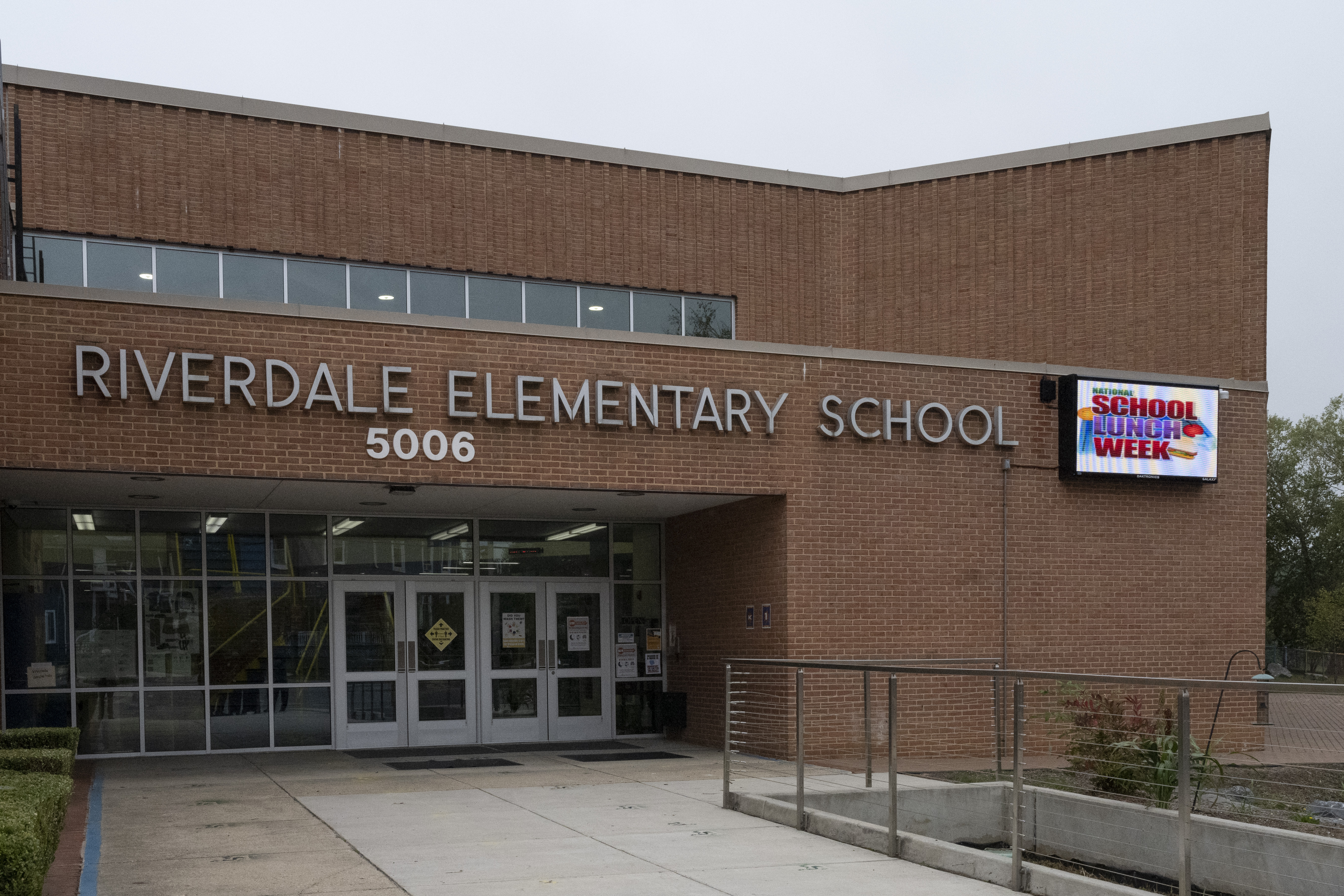
Riverdale Elementary School

Riverdale Park is within the Prince George's County Public Schools system.

Elementary schools serving the town include:

- Riverdale Elementary School
- University Park Elementary School in University Park
- Rogers Heights Elementary School

Middle schools serving the town in separate attendance zones include:

- Hyattsville Middle School
- William Wirt Middle School

High schools serving the town in separate attendance zones include:

- Parkdale High School
- Bladensburg High School
- Northwestern High School

College Park Academy Public Charter School is in Riverdale Park.

== Economy ==
The Animal and Plant Health Inspection Service is based in Riverdale Park.

== Transportation ==
=== Roads and highways ===
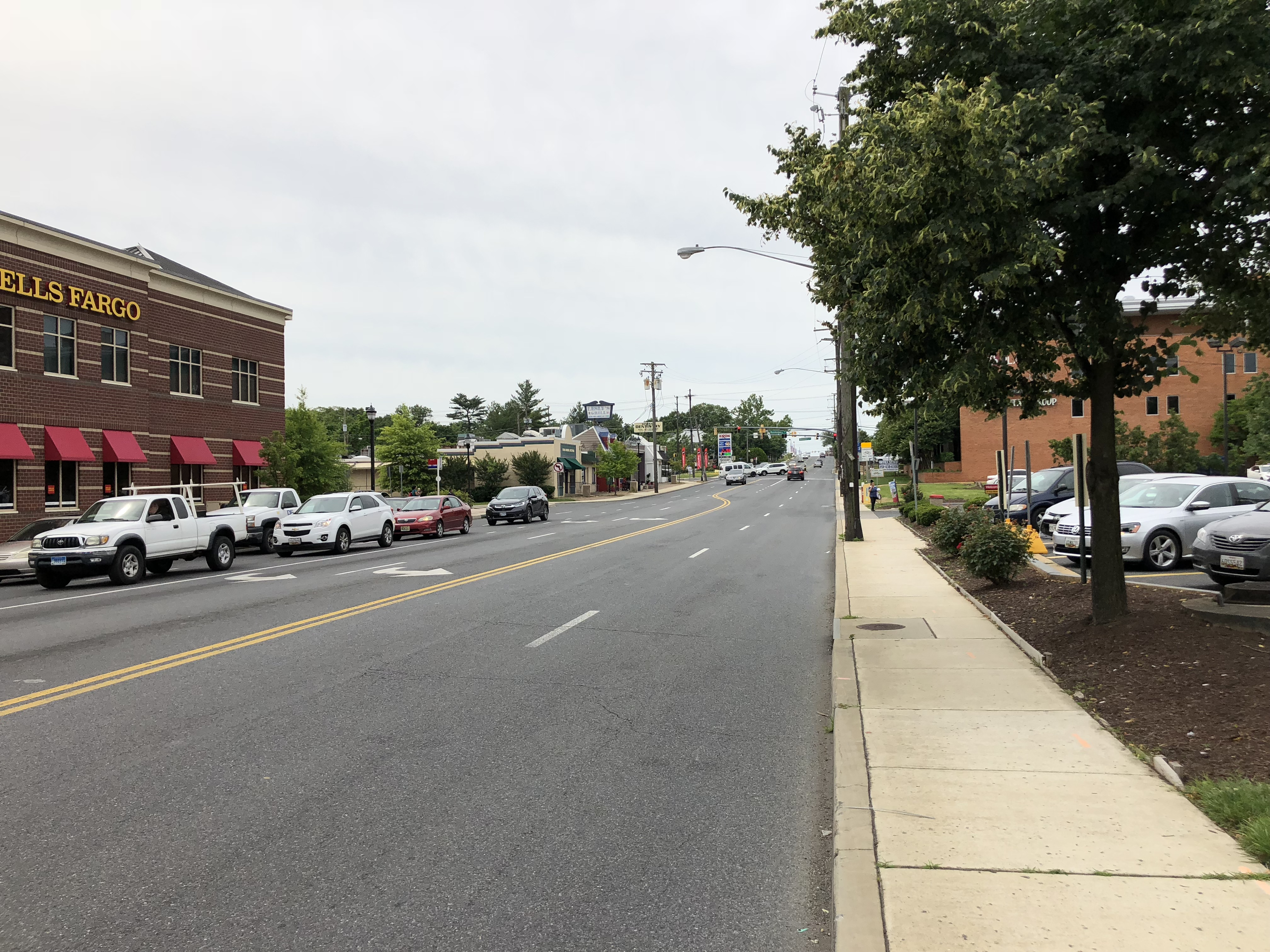
US 1 southbound in Riverdale Park

Several state highways serve Riverdale Park. The most prominent of these is U.S. Route 1, which follows Baltimore Avenue along a north-sign alignment on the west edge of town. On the opposite side of town, Maryland Route 201 also follows Kenilworth Avenue on a north–south alignment. Maryland Route 410, the aptly named East-West Highway, connects the two roads. Heading away from the town, US 1 and MD 201 both connect southward to Washington, D.C., and northward to the nearest interstate highways, Interstate 95 and Interstate 495 (the Capital Beltway). MD 410 serves as a local connector linking together the inner suburbs north and northeast of Washington D.C. MD 431 also serves Riverdale Park, linking it with College Park.

=== Public transportation ===
The town is served by Metrobus and TheBus. Riverdale Park Town Center station is served by the MARC Camden Line. Riverdale Park will have two stations (Riverdale Park–Kenilworth station and Riverdale Park North–UMD station) on the Purple Line light rail system, which is planned to open in 2027.

== Notable people ==
Moses Nyeman is a professional soccer player who has played for Loudoun United and now as a midfielder for D.C. United in Major League Soccer. The Liberian born pro footballer immigrated to Riverdale Park and has represented the United States at the U-16 International level.

== Geography ==
According to the United States Census Bureau, the town has a total area of 1.68 square miles (4.35 km^{2}), of which, 1.65 square miles (4.27 km^{2}) is land and 0.03 square miles (0.08 km^{2}) is water.

== See also ==
- Riversdale (Riverdale Park, Maryland), a historic mansion in Riverdale.
