= Tuxedo, Maryland =

Unincorporated community in Maryland, United States

- Unincorporated community
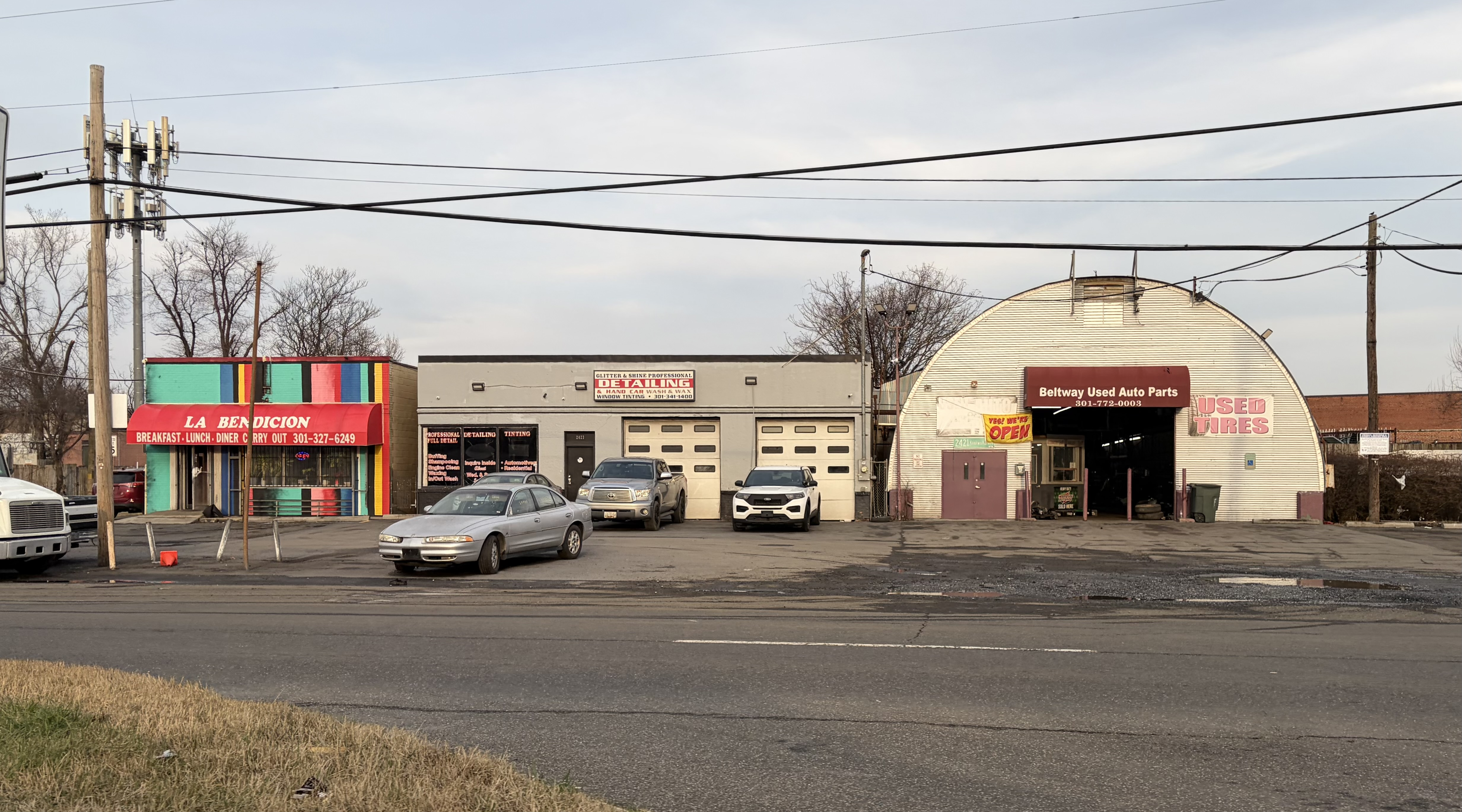
- Shops in Tuxedo in March 2026

- Location within the state of Maryland Tuxedo, Maryland (the United States)
- Coordinates: 38°55′3″N 76°55′16″W
- Country: United States of America
- State: Maryland
- County: Prince George's
- Time zone: UTC-5 (Eastern (EST))
  - Summer (DST): UTC-4 (EDT)
- GNIS feature ID: 598187

Tuxedo is an unincorporated community in Prince George's County, Maryland, United States.

== History ==
Scattered settlement in Tuxedo appeared along the Baltimore and Potomac Railroad (later the Pennsylvania Railroad) by 1886, according to historic maps. In 1894, a local developer created the area as a railroad suburb of DC and named it Tuxedo, advertising it as "Washington's Prettiest Suburb", with its own train station. Despite aggressive sales, the settlement slowly developed along three blocks adjacent to the rail line. By 1917, the community contained approximately 20 houses, one church, and one school. Tuxedo grew to include two additional blocks and a total of approximately 50 residences and a new school by 1942.

The community is bounded on the north by the Town of Cheverly, on the south and east by the John Hanson Highway, and on the west by the B&O Railroad line. All of the census and demographic data for Tuxedo residents are included with the information for the Town of Cheverly.

Tuxedo has remained unincorporated, but shares services with the incorporated town of Cheverly, which was developed in the early 20th century. The second school constructed in Tuxedo was called the Cheverly-Tuxedo School and opened in 1923. This school and another facility in Cheverly remained in operation until 1991. Since that time, the Cheverly-Tuxedo School has functioned as a specialty education center. Another facility shared with Cheverly was the volunteer fire department. The original Tuxedo-Cheverly Fire Station was constructed in 1930, but in 1968 a new station was constructed at 5711 Tuxedo Road. Both stations were originally all volunteer, with assistance from Prince George's County career (paid) firefighters coming later to supplement the volunteers. By 1995 the volunteers had ceased operation and the Tuxedo-Cheverly Fire Company (officially called Company 22) became the first fire station in Prince George's County to be staffed 24/7 by career firefighters. Unfortunately, the station was closed in 2010 with the county citing budget constraints and nearby station overlap. Most personnel and apparatus were transferred to the newly constructed Springdale Fire Station (Company 06) in nearby Springdale, Md. The previous Tuxedo-Cheverly Fire Station building was badly in need of repairs and was subsequently sold to a private buyer.

This building is now operated by the New Horizons Supported Services organization, which is dedicated to the personal and employment advancement of individuals with intellectual and developmental disabilities. Most of the land in and around Tuxedo has become industrial because of its proximity to the railroad line, the John Hanson Highway, and Baltimore–Washington Parkway.

== Notable person ==
- The former Chief of the Metropolitan Police Department of the District of Columbia, Cathy Lanier, grew up in Tuxedo.
