= BWI Business Partnership LINK Shuttle =

Overview
- Operator: BWI Business Partnership; Huber Bus Service
- Status: Active
- Began service: 2016

Route
- Locale: Anne Arundel County
- Communities served: BWI Business District
- Landmarks served: BWI Airport, BWI Rail Station
- Start: NSA Visitor Control Center; Fort George G. Meade
- End: BWI Rail Station

Service
- Level: Daily
- Frequency: Every 35 minutes (approx.)
- Operates: Monday-Friday; 5:45AM-5:30PM

The BWI Business Partnership LINK Shuttle is a free bus service provided by the BWI Business Partnership that circulates the BWI Business District surrounding the Baltimore/Washington International Airport, as well as military installations and defense contractors located at Fort Meade. The free shuttle provides last mile connections for employees and visitors in the area by connecting businesses and hotels to the BWI Rail Station, served by the MARC Penn Line and Amtrak, as well as the Baltimore Light Rail at the BWI Business District Light Rail station.

Established in 2016, the shuttle provides an essential link between numerous government agencies and businesses to public transport. Key landmarks served include the Friendship Annex, National Electronics Museum, Northrop Grumman, the National Security Agency, and others.

The shuttle bus operates approximately every 35 minutes Monday through Friday from 5:45 AM to 5:30 PM (excluding federal holidays).
