= National Cryptologic University =

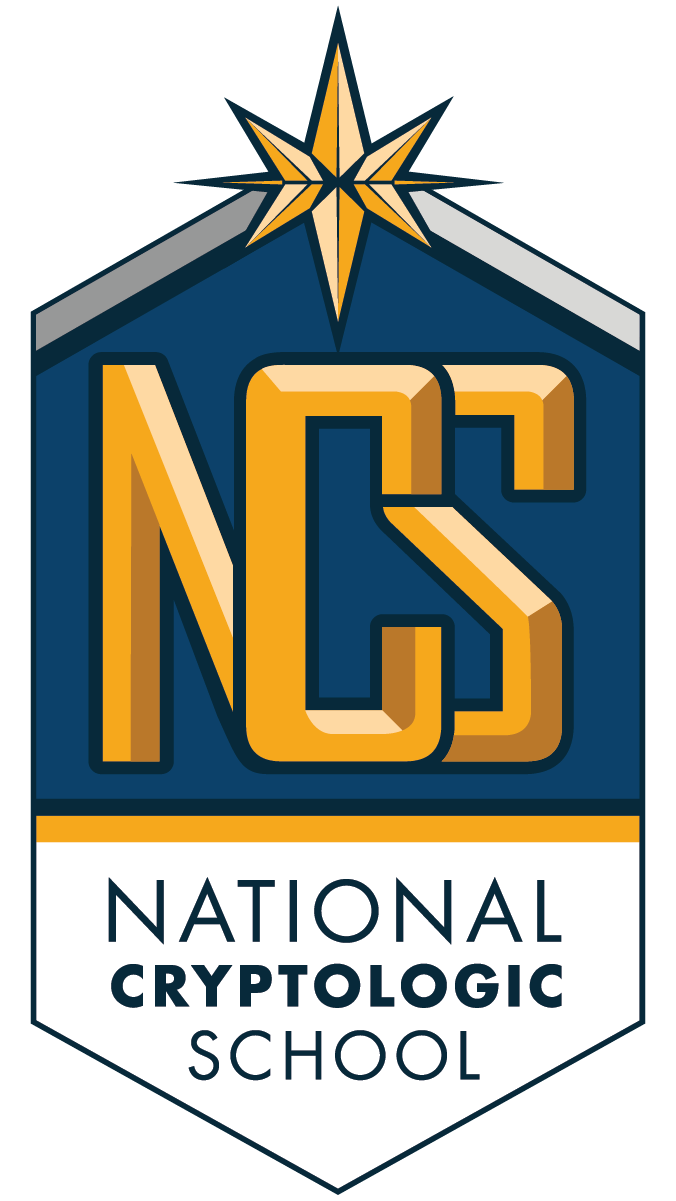
- Logo of the National Cryptologic School (since re-structuring as the National Cryptologic University, no new logo has been published as of October 2023)
- Formation: November 1, 1965; 60 years ago
- Location: Friendship Annex
- Official language: English
- The first director: Frank Byron Rowlett
- Parent organization: National Security Agency
- Website: www.nsa.gov

The National Cryptologic University (NCU) (formerly known as the National Cryptologic School, or the NCS) is a school within the National Security Agency that provides training to members of the United States Intelligence Community.

The National Cryptologic University is a Cryptologic Training School within the National Security Agency (NSA). It is responsible for designing, developing, and delivering curriculum in cryptology, information assurance, language, and leadership.

It was opened on November 1, 1965, and is now housed on multiple campuses, including the NSA's Friendship Annex facility in Linthicum, Maryland.

It was renamed from the National Cryptologic School to the National Cryptologic University in 2022.

NCU courses are provided to the civilian and military population of the NSA, as well as the Intelligence Community, the military services, and the Central Security Service (CSS). Many of the courses are accredited by the American Council on Education and the Council on Occupational Education, and are eligible for transfer credits at a variety of educational institutions.

Training is delivered via computer-based methods, as well as in the traditional classroom setting. Employees have access to thousands of web-based training courses developed by NSA, as well as those offered by a variety of vendors and agencies throughout the Intelligence Community.

== See also ==
- Dundee Society
- Zendian problem
- Government Code and Cypher School
