= BWI Rail Station =

Intermodal passenger station in Linthicum, Maryland

BWI Thurgood Marshall Airport, MD
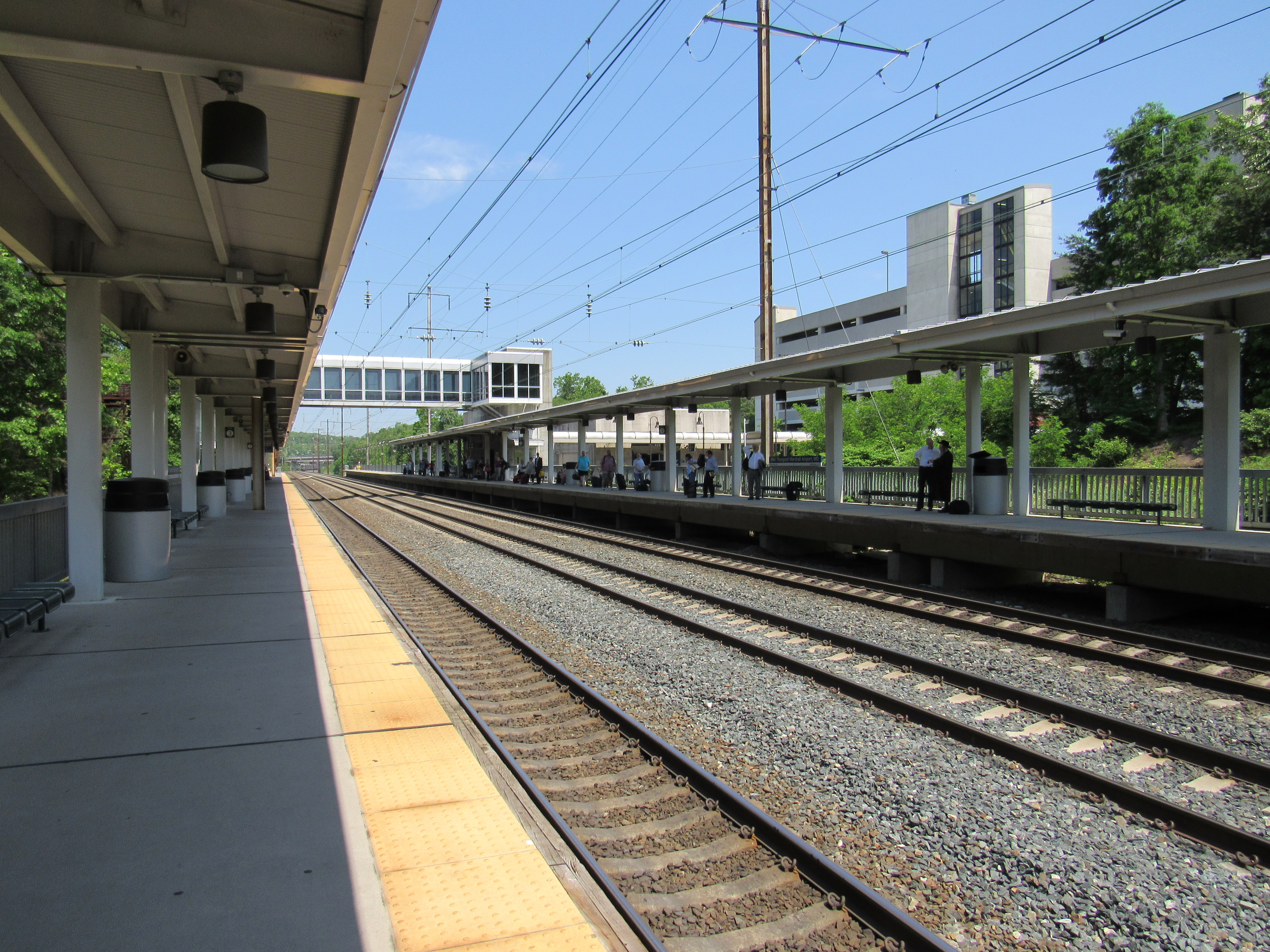
- Station platforms in May 2017

General information
- Location: 2-7 Amtrak Way; Linthicum, Maryland; United States
- Coordinates: 39°11′33″N 76°41′41″W
- Owner: Maryland Transit Administration (building); Amtrak (rail infrastructure)
- Line: Amtrak Northeast Corridor
- Platforms: 2 side platforms
- Tracks: 3
- Connections: ✈ BWI airport terminals (via shuttle); Baltimore Light RailLink (via shuttle); MTA BaltimoreLink: 75, 201; BWI Business Partnership LINK Shuttle; UMBC Transit: BWI Line; BWI Trail

Construction
- Parking: 3,200 spaces; Paid garages
- Cycle facilities: Yes
- Accessible: Yes

Other information
- Station code: Amtrak: BWI
- Website: bwiairport.com/to-from-bwi/transportation/transit/

History
- Opened: October 26, 1980
- Rebuilt: 2019

Passengers
- FY 2025: 911,275 (Amtrak only)

Services
Preceding station	Amtrak	Following station
Washington, D.C. Terminus	Acela	Baltimore toward Boston South
Washington, D.C. toward New Orleans	Crescent	Baltimore toward New York
New Carrollton toward Savannah	Palmetto	Baltimore toward New York
New Carrollton toward Norfolk, Newport News or Roanoke	Northeast Regional	Baltimore toward Boston South or Springfield
New Carrollton toward Washington, D.C.	Vermonter	Baltimore toward St. Albans
Cardinal does not stop here
Carolinian does not stop here
Silver Meteor does not stop here
Preceding station	MARC	Following station
Odenton toward Union Station	Penn Line	Halethorpe toward Perryville
Former services
Preceding station	Amtrak	Following station
Odenton toward Washington, D.C.	Chesapeake	Edmondson toward Philadelphia–Suburban
Capital Beltway toward Washington, D.C.	Metroliner	Baltimore toward New York
Location

BWI Rail Station (signed as BWI Thurgood Marshall Airport) is an intermodal passenger station in Linthicum, Maryland near Baltimore/Washington International Airport (BWI). It is served by Amtrak Northeast Corridor intercity trains, MARC Penn Line regional rail trains, and several local bus lines.

The station is located just over a mile from the airport's terminal. It was the first intercity rail station in the United States built to service an airport. A free shuttle bus runs between the station and the airport terminal at all hours.

Although Penn Station is the Baltimore area's main intercity station, BWI Airport is a major Amtrak stop in its own right and one of the busiest in Maryland.

== History ==
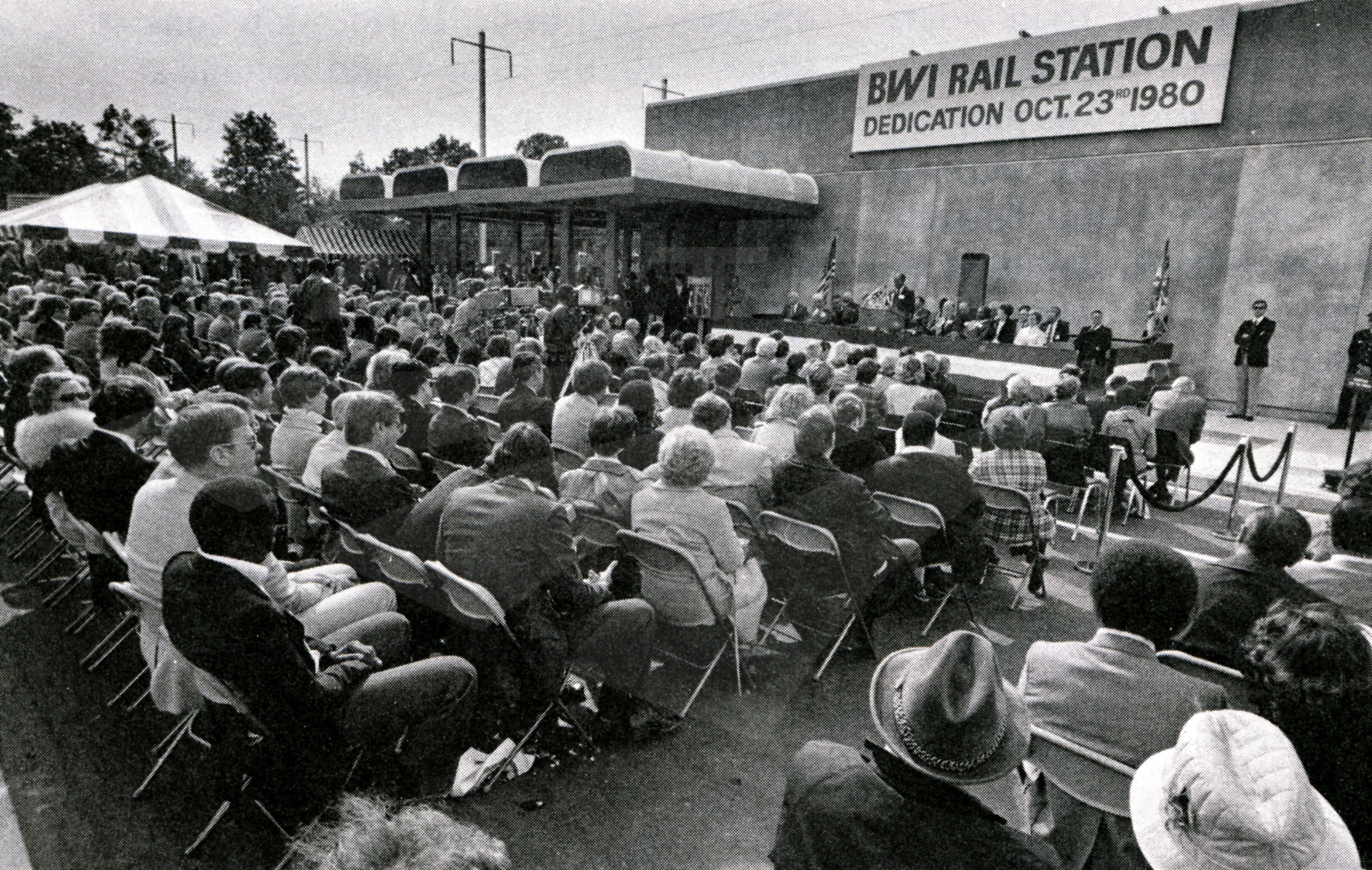
Amtrak vice president Bill Norman speaks at the dedication ceremony in October 1980

First proposed in 1964 by Charles Adler, a Baltimore-based inventor of traffic and aircraft safety devices, the station was dedicated on October 23, 1980 – coincidentally, mere hours after Adler's death – and opened for Amtrak intercity and Conrail (now MARC) commuter trains three days later.

The station's building houses a ticketing desk, waiting room, and a concessions area. The adjacent parking garage is used by commuters who ride the train to work in Baltimore or Washington, and also contains the bus stop for shuttles to the BWI terminal. The garage was built in the late 1990s to replace a smaller surface lot. It contains 3,200 parking spaces and typically does not fill to capacity.

=== Platform renovations ===
The 1,050 feet (320 m) high-level platforms were rebuilt and lengthened between 2006 and 2010. The existing structures were replaced with new precast concrete segments, and new signs, lights, shelters, railing, canopies, and benches were installed.

=== Expansion ===
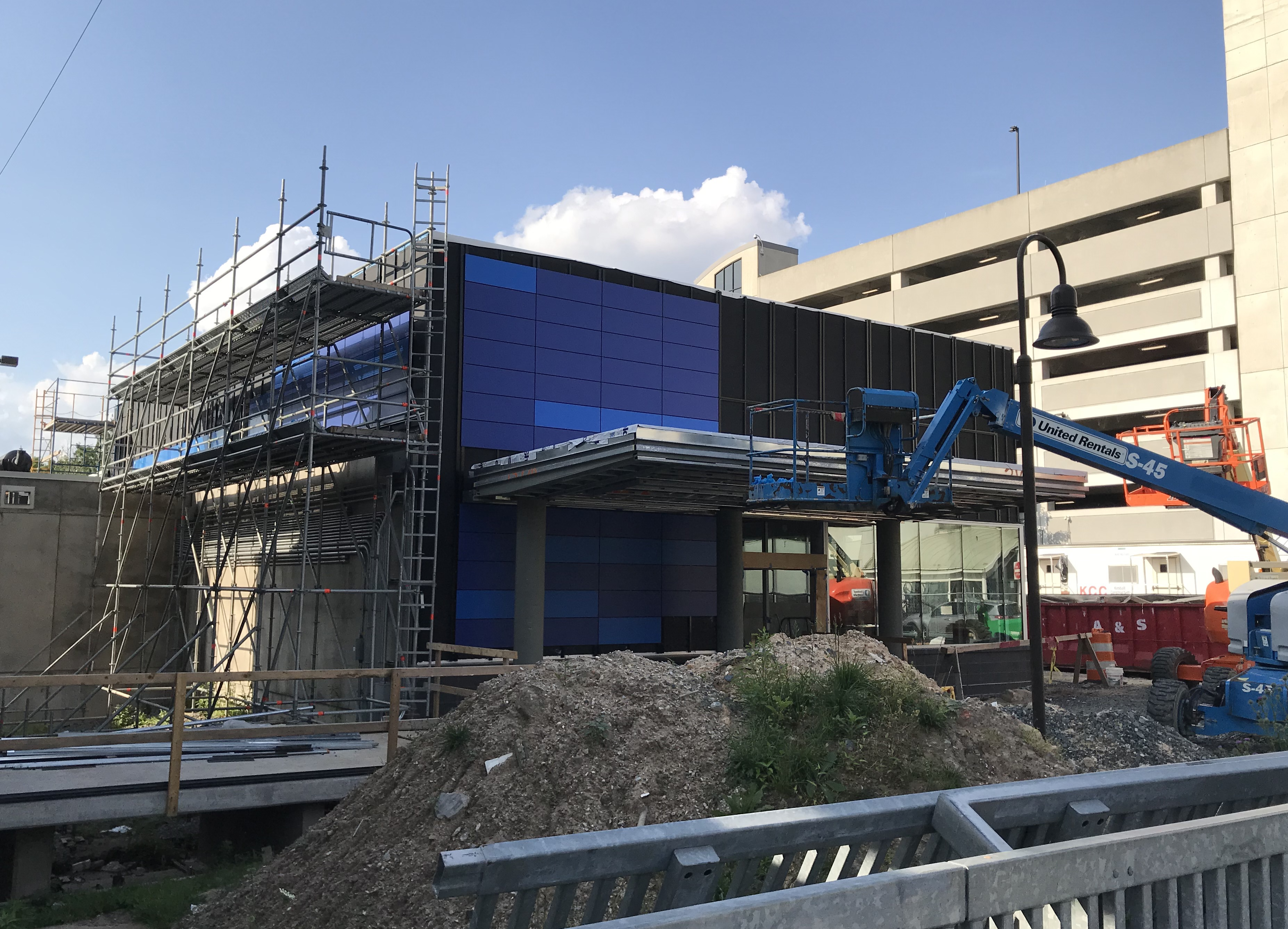
The new station under construction in June 2019

In 2010, $9.4 million was allocated for design and engineering of a new station building and fourth track, which was then expected to cost $80–100 million. MDOT requested $300 million in federal funds for the project in 2011, but the request was denied. The Federal Railroad Administration issued a Finding Of No Significant Impact—a major step in the environmental review process—in February 2016, clearing the way for final design and construction to begin after funding was obtained. The project was then expected to cost $600 million and include 9.4 miles (15.1 km) of fourth track.

On August 27, 2018, the MTA began a $4.7 million project to rebuild and enlarge the station. A temporary station building was used during construction. The new station opened in October 2019, with a ribbon-cutting ceremony held in December. The renovation did not modify the Amtrak-owned footbridge, which has water leakage and cleanliness issues, nor add WiFi service in the MTA-owned waiting area. In response, the MTA said that it does not offer WiFi at any of its stations, but is working with Amtrak to ensure that the footbridge gets needed repairs.

== Station layout and services ==
=== Northeast Corridor ===
BWI Rail Station is located on Amtrak's Northeast Corridor, a 457-mile-long (735 km) rail line connecting Washington, D.C., Philadelphia, New York, and Boston. Amtrak's Acela, Carolinian, Crescent, Northeast Regional, Vermonter, and Palmetto, as well as the MARC Penn Line commuter rail service, stop at the station. Amtrak long distance trains, as well as some Northeast Regional and Acela Express trains, bypass the station.

The station appears in Amtrak timetables as BWI Thurgood Marshall Airport. Unlike most major stations along the Northeast Corridor, checked baggage service is not available at BWI.

=== Public transit services ===
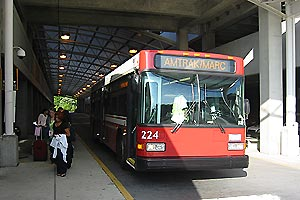
An airport shuttle bus at the station

- Airport shuttle bus: The station is indirectly connected to MTA's Baltimore Light Rail, for which there is a stop (BWI Marshall Airport) station at the airport terminal.
- MTA LocalLink 75: Connects the station to Arundel Mills (to the south) and the Patapsco Baltimore Light Rail station (to the north), with stops at the airport terminal and the BWI Business District station.
- MTA commuter bus route 201: Offers service between Gaithersburg and BWI Airport.
- UMBC Transit
- BayRunner Shuttle, a private shuttle connecting east to the Eastern Shore area of Maryland and connecting shuttle to Cumberland.
- County Connector, a semi-public funded, free-to-use shuttle, connecting to Arundel Mills, and with Anne Arundel County's 202 and Fort Meade routes, provides a inter-agency link for the NSA Friendship Annex to the National Security Agency.

=== Pedestrian and bicycle access ===
- BWI Trail: A walk/bike trail completely encircles the airport grounds parallel to the Airport Loop, and runs adjacent to the station.
- An elevated walkway connects the station (at the second floor of the southbound platform's stairwell) with office buildings on Corporate Center Drive, including the Maryland Department of Transportation headquarters.
