= Military Cryptanalytics =

Military Cryptanalytics (or MILCRYP as it is sometimes known) is a revision by Lambros D. Callimahos of the series of books written by William F. Friedman under the title Military Cryptanalysis. It may also contain contributions by other cryptanalysts. It was a training manual for National Security Agency and military cryptanalysts. It was published for government use between 1957 and 1977, though parts I and II were written in 1956 and 1959.

== Callimahos on the work ==
From the Introduction in Part I, Volume I, by Callimahos: "This text represents an extensive expansion and revision, both in scope and content, of the earlier work entitled 'Military Cryptanalysis, Part I' by William F. Friedman. This expansion and revision was necessitated by the considerable advancement made in the art since the publication of the previous text."

Callimahos referred to parts III–VI at the end of the first volume: "...Part III will deal with varieties of aperiodic substitution systems, elementary cipher devices and cryptomechanisms, and will embrace a detailed treatment of cryptomathematics and diagnostic tests in cryptanalysis; Part IV will treat transposition and fractioning systems, and combined substitution-transposition systems; Part V will treat the reconstruction of codes, and the solution of enciphered code systems, and Part VI will treat the solution of representative machine cipher systems." However, parts IV–VI were never completed.

== Declassification ==
Both Military Cryptanalytics and Military Cryptanalysis have been subjects of Mandatory Declassification Review (MDR) requests, including one by John Gilmore in 1992-1993 and two by Charles Varga in 2004 and 2016.

All four parts of Military Cryptanalysis and the first two parts of the Military Cryptanalytics series have been declassified. The third part of Military Cryptanalytics was declassified in part in December 2020 and published by GovernmentAttic.org in 2021. In 1984 NSA released copies of Military Cryptanalytics parts I and II to the (US) National Archives and Records Administration, Record Group 457, as SRH-273 and SRH-274, respectively. ("SRH" stands for "Special Research History.")

== Reprints ==
All the declassified books except the third part of Military Cryptanalytics have been reprinted by Aegean Park Press. Each part of Military Cryptanalytics consists of two volumes: the first volume contains the tutorial text and the second volume contains appendices. Part I includes material on both uniliteral and multiliteral ciphers and polyalphabetic ciphers. Part II includes material on repeating-key and bipartite systems and periodic ciphers. Part II, volume II includes the Zendian Problem, a practical exercise in traffic analysis and cryptanalysis.

For the Aegean Park Press edition, Wayne G. Barker added programs for the TRS-80.

== Books ==
- Military Cryptanalytics, Part I, Volume 1, ISBN 0-89412-073-5
- Military Cryptanalytics, Part I, Volume 2, ISBN 0-89412-074-3
- Military Cryptanalytics, Part II, Volume 1, ISBN 0-89412-075-1
- Military Cryptanalytics, Part II, Volume 2, ISBN 0-89412-076-X
- Military Cryptanalysis, Part I, ISBN 0-89412-044-1
- Military Cryptanalysis, Part II, ISBN 0-89412-064-6
- Military Cryptanalysis, Part III, Simpler Varieties of Aperiodic Substitution Systems, ISBN 0-89412-196-0
- Military Cryptanalysis, Part IV, Transposition and Fractionating Systems, ISBN 0-89412-198-7

== See also ==
- National Security Agency academic publications
