= Arthur Lora =

Arthur Lora (March 11, 1903 - November 28, 1992) was an Italian-born American flautist and music educator. He was an influential flute pedagogue of the 20th century who taught on the faculty of the Juilliard School for 53 years. He was principal flautist of several orchestras, including the Metropolitan Opera Orchestra (1937-1945) and the NBC Symphony Orchestra (1947-1952); the latter under Arturo Toscanini.

== Life and career ==
The son of Antonio Lora and Amalia Lora (née Daniele), Arthur Lora was born in Novale (near Valdagno in the Province of Vicenza), Italy on March 11, 1903. His brother Anotonio Lora was a composer and pianist, and his other brother, Alfred Lora, was a violinist. He immigrated to the United States with his family at the age of four; settling in Woonsocket, Rhode Island in 1907. The family lived there until 1916 when they moved again to New York City.

Arthur Lora began studying both the flute and solfege at the age of eight. From 1919 until his graduation with an Artist Diploma in 1924 he studied with Georges Barrère at the Institute of Musical Art (now the Juilliard School). His music theory teachers at Juilliard included Franklin Robinson, Alfred Madeley Richardson, and Percy Goetschius. In 1925 he was appointed associate flute professor at Juilliard under Barrère, and ultimately succeeded him as flute professor in 1944. He remained a professor at Juilliard until his retirement in 1978. He joined the faculty of the Manhattan School of Music in 1939 and taught at the Montreal Conservatoire in 1943.

Lora held several important orchestra posts during his career. He was first flutist of the City Symphony of New York (1922-23), the State Symphony of New York (1924-25), the Metropolitan Opera Orchestra (1937-1945), and the NBC Symphony Orchestra under Arturo Toscanini (1947-1952).

Lora was influential flautist of the 20th century, both as a player and teacher. As an educator he was proponent of the methods developed by Georges Barrère. He helped to popularize the use of the B foot joint (as opposed to the C foot joint) on the flute. Several of his students had successful careers as concert and orchestral flautists; including Lambros D. Callimahos, Ransom Wilson, and Leonard Posella.

Lora died on November 28, 1992 in Santa Barbara, California. He was married to the soprano Gloria Lora.
