= Dundee Society =

The Dundee Society was a society of graduates of CA-400, a National Security Agency course in cryptology devised by Lambros D. Callimahos, which included the Zendian Problem (a practical exercise in traffic analysis and cryptanalysis). The class was held once a year, and new members were inducted into the Society upon completion of the class. The Society was founded in the mid-1950s and continued after Callimahos retired from the NSA in 1976. The last CA-400 class was held at NSA in 1979, formally closing the society's membership rolls.

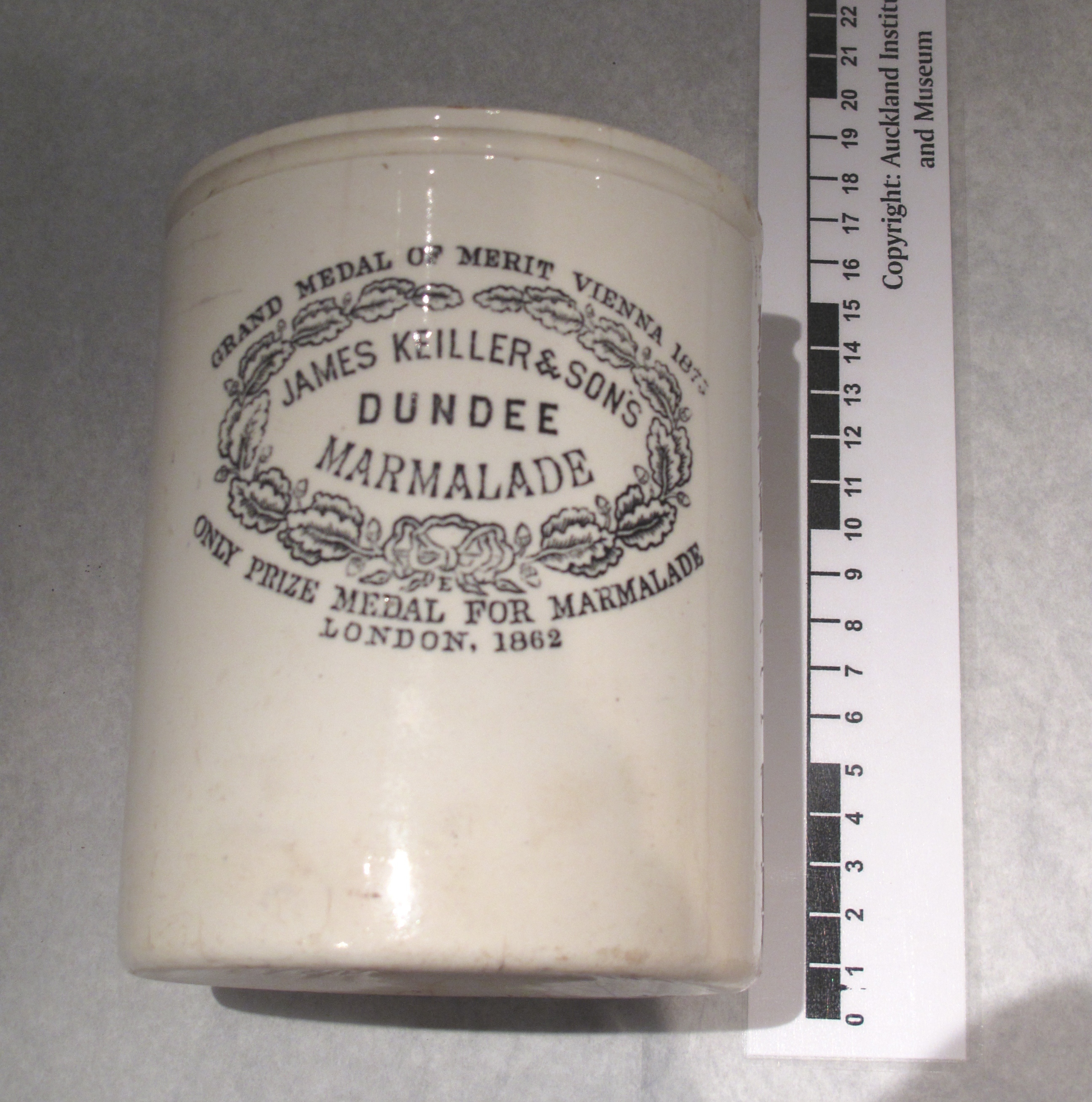
Keiller's Dundee marmalade jar

The society took its name from an empty jar of Dundee Marmalade that Callimahos kept on his desk for use as a pencil caddy. Callimahos came up with the society's name while trying to schedule a luncheon for former CA-400 students at the Ft. Meade Officers' Club. Being unable to use either the course name or the underlying government agency's name for security reasons, he spotted the ceramic Dundee jar and decided to use "The Dundee Society" as the cover name for the luncheon reservation. CA-400 students were presented with ceramic Dundee Marmalade jars at the close of the course as part of the induction ceremony into the Dundee Society. When Dundee switched from ceramic to glass jars, Callimahos would still present graduates with ceramic Dundee jars, but the jars were then collected back up for use in the next year's induction ceremony. Members were "encouraged" to seek out Dundee jars for their collections if they wished to have a permanent token of induction.

== See also ==
- American Cryptogram Association
- National Cryptologic School
