= Bowie Police Department (Maryland) =

Primary law enforcement agency for Bowie, Maryland, US

Coordinates: 38.96088°N 76.741034°W

Bowie City Police Department
- Patch of Bowie Police Department
- Abbreviation: BPD

Agency overview
- Formed: 2006; 20 years ago
- Employees: 86

Jurisdictional structure
- Operations jurisdiction: Bowie, Maryland, USA
- Population: 54,884 (2004)
- General nature: Local civilian police

Operational structure
- Headquarters: Bowie, Maryland
- Officers: 56
- Civilian employees: 21
- Agency executive: Dwayne Preston, Chief Of Police

Facilities
- Headquarters (located on the Lowest level of City Hall)s: 15901 Fred Robinson Way, Bowie, MD 20716

Website
- https://www.cityofbowie.org/150/Police

The Bowie City Police Department (BPD) is the primary law enforcement agency for Bowie, Maryland, servicing a population of 54,884 (2004 census estimate) in 16 square miles (41 km^{2}) of the municipality.

== Overview ==
The City of Bowie Police Department was established on September 11, 2006, under the direction of then-Police Chief Katherine Perez and Deputy Police Chief John K. Nesky. Currently, the Bowie Police Department is under the leadership of Police Chief Dwayne and Deputy Chief Robert V. Liberati, Jr. The Bowie Police Department is located in Prince George's County and is among the largest municipalities within the State of Maryland. As of today, the agency has a total of 57 sworn police officers. The Bowie Police Department also currently employs 21 civilian personnel. The City of Bowie Police Department covers approximately 18 square miles, protecting approximately 60,000 residents. The police department consists of several sections and divisions, which include the following: patrol division, community services section, criminal investigations section, directed response team, canine unit, training section, administrative support section, records section, evidence processing section, and most recently added its own communications and dispatch division.

Chiefs of Police History:

Dwayne Preston: Dec. 21, 2023–Present (Acting Chief - Sept. 2023 - Dec. 2023)

John K. Nesky: 2012 - Sept. 2023

Katherine Perez: 2006 - 2012
