= Zendian problem =

Exercise in communication intelligence

The Zendian problem was an exercise in communication intelligence operations (mainly traffic analysis and cryptanalysis) devised by Lambros D. Callimahos as part of an advanced course, CA-400, that Callimahos taught to National Security Agency cryptanalysts starting in the 1950s.

== Content ==
The scenario involves 375 radio messages said to have been intercepted on December 23 by the US Army contingent of a United Nations force landed on the fictional island of Zendia in the Pacific Ocean.

A typical intercept looks like this:

XYR DE OWN 4235KCS 230620T USM-99/00091

9516 8123 0605 7932 8423 5095 8444 6831

JAAAJ EUEBD OETDN GXAWR SUTEU   EIWEN YUENN ODEUH RROMM EELGE
AEGID TESRR RASEB ENORS RNOMM   EAYTU NEONT ESFRS NTCRO QCEET
OCORE IITLP OHSRG SSELY TCCSV   SOTIU GNTIV EVOMN TMPAA CIRCS
ENREN OTSOI ENREI EKEIO PFRNT   CDOGE NYFPE TESNI EACEA ISTEM
SOFEA TROSE EQOAO OSCER HTTAA   LUOUY LSAIE TSERR ESEPA PHVDN
HNNTI IARTX LASLD URATT OPPLO   AITMW OTIAS TNHIR DCOUT NMFCA
SREEE USSDS DHOAH REEXI PROUT   NTTHD JAAAJ EUEBD

For each message, the first line is provided by the intercept operator, giving call signs, frequency, time, and reference number. The rest of the message is a transcript of the Morse code transmission.

At the beginning of the intercepted message there is a header which consists of 8 four-digit groups. Initially, the meaning of the numeric header is not known; the meanings of various components of this header (such as a serial number assigned by the transmitting organization's message center) can be worked out through traffic analysis.

The rest of the message consists of "indicators" and ciphertext; the first group is evidently a "discriminant" indicating the cryptosystem used, and (depending on the cryptosystem) some or all of the second group may contain a message-specific keying element such as initial rotor settings. The first two groups are repeated at the end of the message, which allows correction of garbled indicators. The remaining characters are encrypted text. Since the transmissions always use complete groups, "nulls" may have been used to pad out the text.

Cryptosystems employed include transposition, dinome, and rotor-based ciphers and a one-part code. While these can be successfully tackled without use of a computer, solution is not easy. The practical exercise reinforces many basic principles, including ways to exploit having a collection of message traffic.

A certain amount of Plaintext inter-operator "chatter" is also provided, and may help with the analysis.

Headers and discriminants are also given for intercepts from the next three days; these may be used for traffic analysis and in determining daily operating procedures.

== Availability ==
The Zendian problem has been declassified and is available either as part of Military Cryptanalytics or as a book in itself. Both were published as reprints by Aegean Park Press, Walnut Creek, CA, USA. There are a few small differences in the ciphertext between these sources, with neither being entirely error-free; indeed, some errors were intentional, and dealing with them is part of the learning process.

A February 1958 NSA-hosted scan of Military Cryptanalytics, Part II, Interim Edition (Third Section), containing the Zendian problem as Appendix 8, is freely available online.

Karl Heinz-Everts' Web site provides a link to a downloadable archive of the "intercepts." (The site also provides analysis and partial solutions, which should not be viewed by anyone wishing to learn from working on this exercise.)

== The Dundee Society ==
Cryptanalists who successfully finished CA-400 became members of the Dundee Society. This society was founded by Lambros D. Callimahos and was so named after the empty Dundee marmalade jar on his desk, as he couldn't disclose the society's real purpose.

== Map of Zendia ==
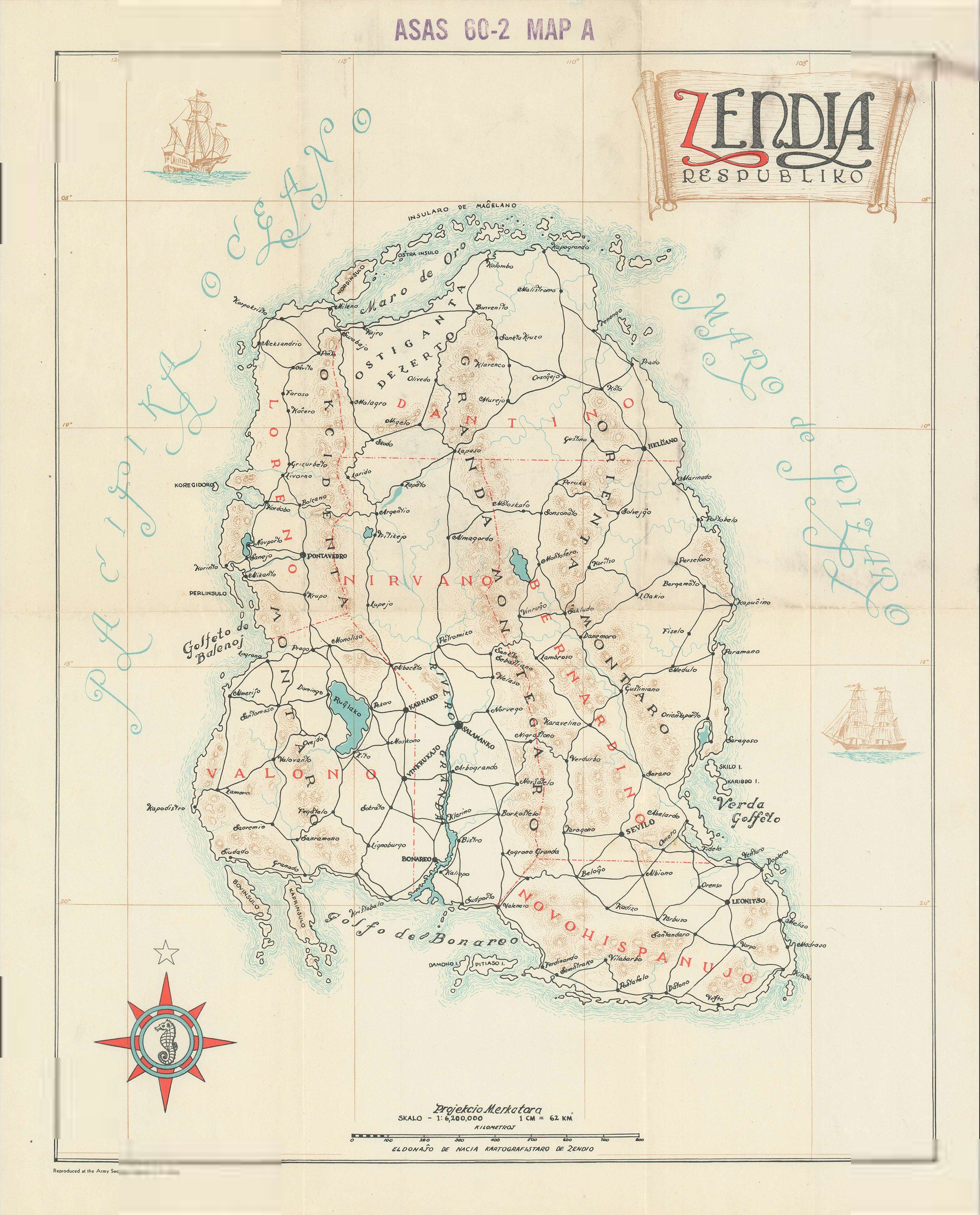
High-resolution color map of Zendia

A large print showing the fictional nation of Zendia hangs on the wall of the library at the National Cryptologic Museum, which is operated by the NSA. Copies of this map, shrunken to such a degree that most feature labels are illegible, appear in the previously cited books.

== See also ==
- Traffic analysis
- Dundee Society
- National Cryptologic Museum
