= BWI Marshall Airport Shuttle =

Bus service at Baltimore-Washington International Airport

Overview
- Operator: Baltimore–Washington International Airport
- Garage: Elkridge Landing Road Lot
- Status: Active
- Began service: 2004

Route
- Locale: Anne Arundel County
- Communities served: BWI Business District
- Landmarks served: BWI Airport, BWI Rail Station
- Start: Service Road Lower Level
- End: Amtrak Way
- Other routes: 17, 99

Service
- Level: Daily
- Frequency: Every 25 minutes Every 6 minutes (peak)
- Weekend frequency: Every 6-25 minutes
- Operates: 24 hours a day

The BWI Marshall Airport Shuttle is a free bus service provided by Baltimore–Washington International Airport, that connects the airport terminal to BWI Rail Station. The free shuttle connects airport passengers to Amtrak and MARC trains, hence connecting the airport to Baltimore and Washington, D.C., as well as the rest of the Northeastern United States.

The shuttle provides an essential link between intercity rail and the airport. The shuttle service connects to the Baltimore Light Rail incidentally due to the BWI Marshall Airport Light Rail Stop being located in Concourse E. Light Rail can be accessed from the shuttle at the line's last terminal stop at Doors 17 & 18.

The shuttle bus operates every 10-15 minutes from 5:00am to 1:00am daily, and every 25 minutes between 1:00am and 5:00am daily.
