= Bowie, Maryland =

- City
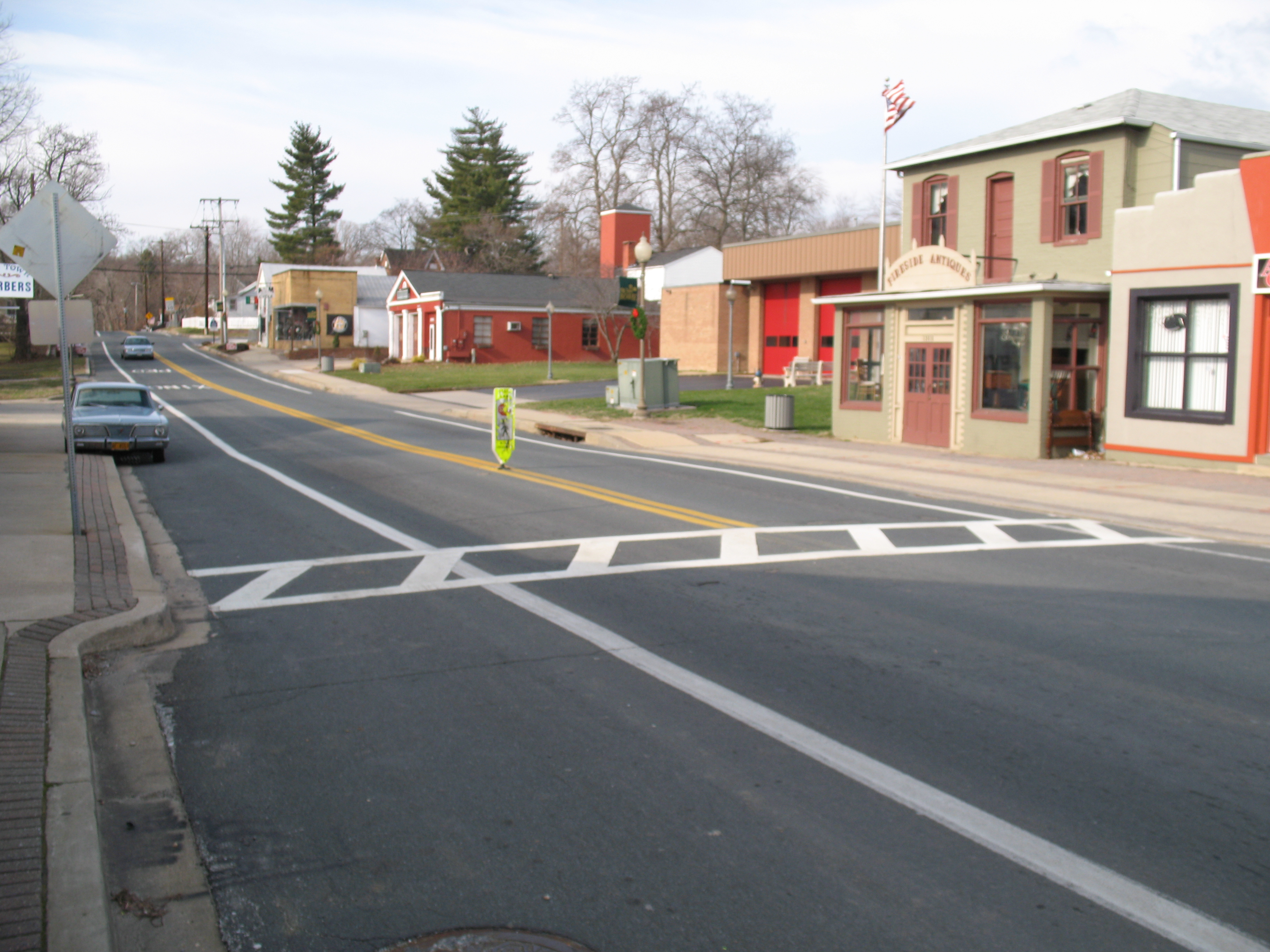
- Old Town Bowie, as seen from the intersection of Maryland Route 564 and Chapel Avenue in January 2008

- Flag Seal
- Nickname: Levitt Bowie
- Motto: "Growth, Unity and Progress"
- Location of Bowie in Prince George's County and the State of Maryland

- Location within the State of Maryland Bowie (the United States)
- Coordinates: 38°57′53″N 76°44′40″W
- Country: United States
- State: Maryland
- County: Prince George's
- Incorporated: 1882

Government
  - Mayor: Michael Estève

Area
  - Total: 20.55 sq mi (53.22 km^{2})
  - Land: 20.44 sq mi (52.95 km^{2})
  - Water: 0.10 sq mi (0.27 km^{2})
- Elevation: 154 ft (47 m)

Population (2020)
  - Total: 58,329
  - Density: 2,853.3/sq mi (1,101.66/km^{2})
- Time zone: UTC−5 (EST)
  - Summer (DST): UTC−4 (EDT)
- ZIP codes: 20715-20721
- Area codes: 301, 240
- FIPS code: 24-08775
- GNIS feature ID: 0597104
- Website: www.CityofBowie.org

Bowie (/ˈbuːi/) is a city in Prince George's County, Maryland, in the United States. As of the 2020 census, the population was 58,329 persons. Bowie, Maryland has grown from a small railroad town to the largest municipality in Prince George's County. It is the fifth most populous city, and third largest city by area, in Maryland.

== History ==
=== 19th century ===
The city of Bowie owes its existence to the railway. In 1853, Colonel William Duckett Bowie obtained a charter from the Maryland legislature to construct a rail line into Southern Maryland. In 1869, the Baltimore & Potomac Railroad Company began the construction of a railroad from Baltimore to Southern Maryland, terminating in Pope's Creek. The area had already been dotted with small farms and large tobacco plantations in an economy based on agriculture and slavery. In 1870, Ben Plumb, a land speculator and developer, sold building lots around the railroad junction and named the settlement Huntington City. By 1872, the line was completed, together with a "spur" to Washington, D.C., and the entire line through Southern Maryland was completed in 1873.

In 1880, Huntington City was rechartered as Bowie, named for Colonel Bowie's son and business partner Oden Bowie, the former Governor of Maryland and then-president of the Baltimore & Potomac Railroad. In the early days the land was subdivided by developers into more than 500 residential building lots, to create a large town site at a junction of the Baltimore and Potomac's main line to southern Maryland, and the branch line to Washington, D.C.

=== 20th century ===
==== Belair at Bowie ====
In 1957, the firm of Levitt and Sons acquired the nearby Belair Estate, the original colonial plantation of the Provincial Governor of Maryland, Samuel Ogle, and developed the residential community of Belair at Bowie. Two years later the town of Bowie annexed the Levitt properties and then re-incorporated the now-larger area as a city in 1963. The overwhelming majority of Bowie residents today live in this 1960s Levitt planned community, whose street names are arranged in alliterative sections. Levitt & Sons had a long history of prohibiting the sale of houses (including resale by owners) to African Americans which led to protests during the Civil Rights Movement in Bowie in 1963.

==== Belair Estate ====
The original Belair Estate contains the Belair Mansion (circa 1745), the five-part Georgian plantation house of Governor Samuel Ogle and his son Governor Benjamin Ogle. It was purchased in 1898 by the wealthy banker James T. Woodward who, on his passing in 1910, left it to his nephew, William Woodward Sr., who became a famous horseman. Restored to reflect its 250-year-old legacy, the Mansion is listed on the National Register of Historic Places.

Belair Stable, on the Estate, was part of the famous Belair Stud, one of the premier racing stables in the 1930s, '40s, and '50s. Owned and operated by William Woodward Sr. (1876–1953), it closed in 1957 following the death of his son, Billy Woodward. Belair had been the oldest continually operating racing horse farm in the country.

=== 21st century ===
Bowie has an area of 16 square miles (41 km^{2}) and about 50,000 residents with nearly 2,000 acres (8.1 km^{2}) set aside as parks or open space. It has 72 ball fields, three community centers, an ice arena at Allen Pond Park, the Bowie Town Center, the 800-seat Bowie Center for the Performing Arts, a 150-seat theatrical playhouse, a golf course, and three museums.

== Geography ==
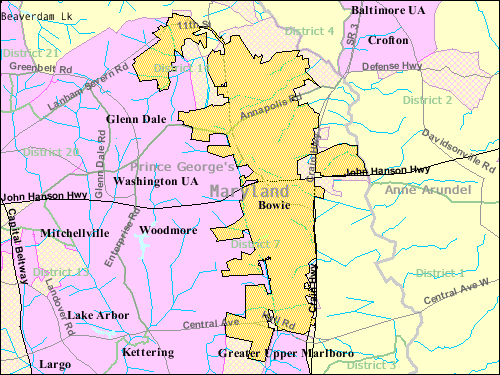
Census map of Bowie and surrounding areas. The city is in orange.

According to the United States Census Bureau, the city has a total area of 18.51 square miles (47.94 km^{2}), of which 18.43 square miles (47.73 km^{2}) is land and 0.08 square miles (0.21 km^{2}) is water.

=== Climate ===
The climate in this area is characterized by hot, humid summers and generally mild to cool winters. According to the Köppen Climate Classification system, Bowie has a humid subtropical climate, abbreviated "Cfa" on climate maps.

== Demographics ==
Historical population
Census	Pop.	Note	%±
1920	677		—
1930	694		2.5%
1940	767		10.5%
1950	860		12.1%
1960	1,072		24.7%
1970	35,028		3,167.5%
1980	33,695		−3.8%
1990	37,589		11.6%
2000	50,269		33.7%
2010	54,727		8.9%
2020	58,329		6.6%
U.S. Decennial Census; 2010 2020

=== Racial and ethnic composition ===
Bowie city, Maryland – Racial and ethnic composition Note: the US Census treats Hispanic/Latino as an ethnic category. This table excludes Latinos from the racial categories and assigns them to a separate category. Hispanics/Latinos may be of any race.
Race / Ethnicity (NH = Non-Hispanic)	Pop 2000	Pop 2010	Pop 2020	% 2000	% 2010	% 2020
White alone (NH)	30,709	21,287	16,182	61.09%	38.90%	27.74%
Black or African American alone (NH)	15,339	26,199	30,832	30.51%	47.87%	52.86%
Native American or Alaska Native alone (NH)	143	115	105	0.28%	0.21%	0.18%
Asian alone (NH)	1,466	2,229	2,616	2.92%	4.07%	4.48%
Native Hawaiian or Pacific Islander alone (NH)	15	15	20	0.03%	0.03%	0.03%
Other race alone (NH)	116	142	374	0.23%	0.26%	0.64%
Mixed race or Multiracial (NH)	1,013	1,654	2,954	2.02%	3.02%	5.06%
Hispanic or Latino (any race)	1,468	3,086	5,246	2.92%	5.64%	8.99%
Total	50,269	54,727	58,329	100.00%	100.00%	100.00%

Bowie is home to a significant Nigerian American community.

=== 2020 census ===
As of the 2020 census, Bowie had a population of 58,329. The median age was 42.3 years. 21.0% of residents were under the age of 18 and 15.9% of residents were 65 years of age or older. For every 100 females there were 87.0 males, and for every 100 females age 18 and over there were 82.3 males age 18 and over.

99.9% of residents lived in urban areas, while 0.1% lived in rural areas.

There were 20,991 households in Bowie, of which 32.0% had children under the age of 18 living in them. Of all households, 49.7% were married-couple households, 13.9% were households with a male householder and no spouse or partner present, and 32.2% were households with a female householder and no spouse or partner present. About 24.2% of all households were made up of individuals and 9.2% had someone living alone who was 65 years of age or older.

There were 21,560 housing units, of which 2.6% were vacant. The homeowner vacancy rate was 0.9% and the rental vacancy rate was 4.7%.

Racial composition as of the 2020 census
Race	Number	Percent
White	16,904	29.0%
Black or African American	31,207	53.5%
American Indian and Alaska Native	220	0.4%
Asian	2,655	4.6%
Native Hawaiian and Other Pacific Islander	24	0.0%
Some other race	2,726	4.7%
Two or more races	4,593	7.9%

=== 2010 census ===
As of the census of 2010, there were 54,727 people, 19,950 households, and 14,264 families residing in the city. The population density was 2,969.5 inhabitants per square mile (1,146.5/km^{2}). There were 20,687 housing units at an average density of 1,122.5 per square mile (433.4/km^{2}).

The ethnic makeup of the city was 41.4% White, 48.7% African American, 0.3% Native American, 4.1% Asian, 0.1% Pacific Islander, 1.9% from other races, and 3.6% from two or more races. Hispanic or Latino of any race were 5.6% of the population.

There were 19,950 households, of which 37.0% had children under the age of 18 living with them, 53.2% were married couples living together, 14.0% had a female householder with no husband present, 4.3% had a male householder with no wife present, and 28.5% were non-families. 23.4% of all households were made up of individuals, and 7.7% had someone living alone who was 65 years of age or older. The average household size was 2.73 and the average family size was 3.23.

The median age in the city was 40.1 years. 24.5% of residents were under the age of 18; 7.6% were between the ages of 18 and 24; 26.2% were from 25 to 44; 30.1% were from 45 to 64; and 11.6% were 65 years of age or older. The gender makeup of the city was 46.9% male and 53.1% female.

According to a 2007 estimate, the median income for a household in the city was $99,105, and the median income for a family was $109,157. Males had a median income of $52,284 versus $40,471 for females. The per capita income for the city was $30,703. About 0.7% of families and 1.6% of the population were below the poverty line, including 1.0% of those under age 18 and 1.8% of those age 65 or over.

- Rank by per capita income in Prince George's County: 7
- Rank by per capita income in Maryland: 65

== Government ==
The City of Bowie operates under a council-manager government as established by the city charter. This means that the mayor and council are responsible for making policy, passing ordinances, voting appropriations, and having overall supervisory authority in the city government.

The U.S. Postal Service operates multiple post offices including Mitchellville, West Bowie, and Bowie/Mitchellville Carrier Annex (adjacent to the city limits).

=== Law enforcement ===
The primary law enforcement agency for the city is the Bowie Police Department aided by the Prince George's County Police, the Maryland-National Capital Park Police Department, and the Sheriff's Office as directed by authority.

Prince George's County Police Department District 2 Station in Brock Hall CDP, with a Bowie postal address, serves the community.

== Transportation ==
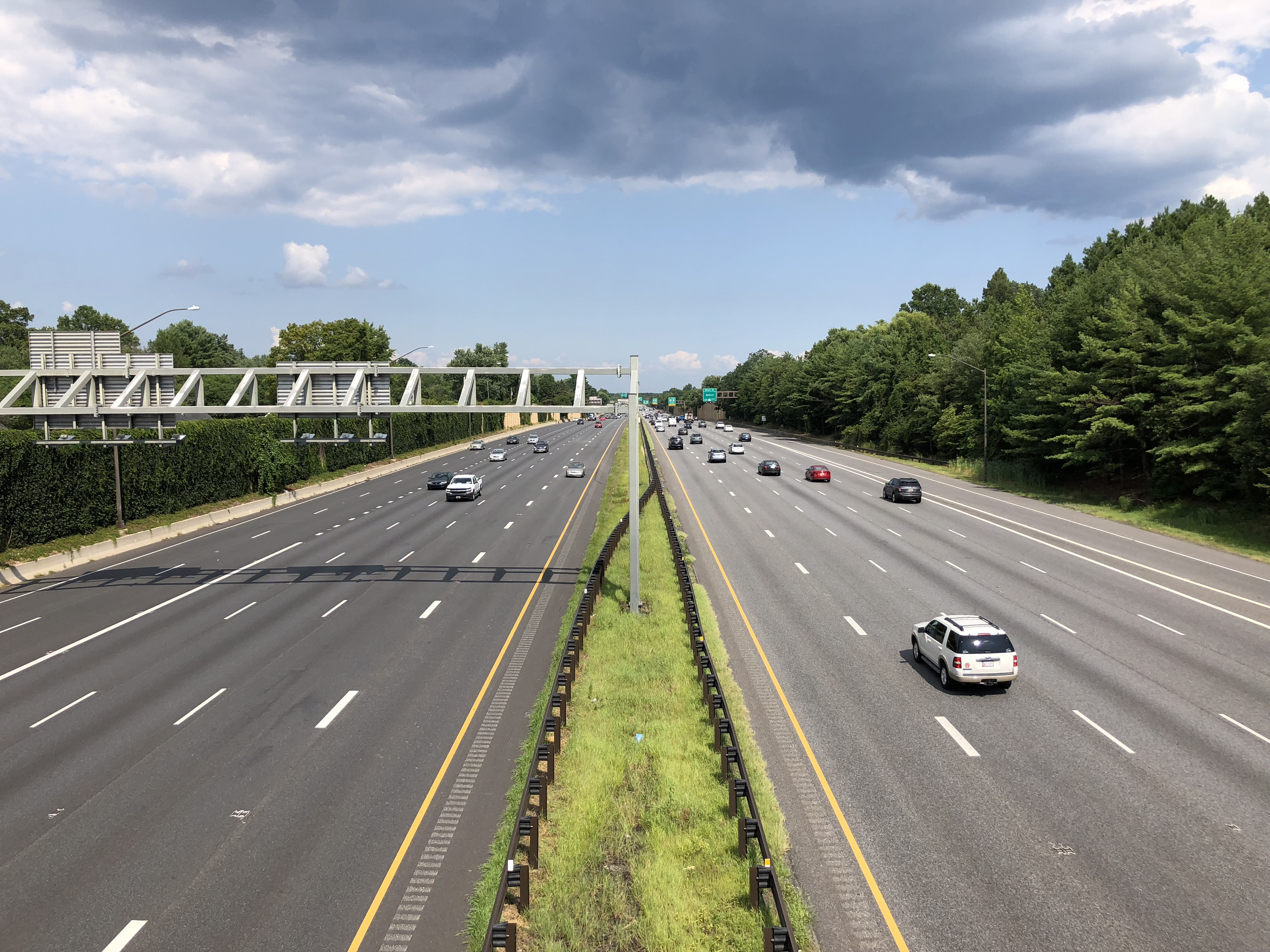
I-595/US 50 eastbound in Bowie

Bowie is served by several significant highways. The most prominent of these is Interstate 595/U.S. Route 50, the John Hanson Highway, which follows an east–west route through the city. Via I-595/US 50, Bowie has direct connections westward to Washington, D.C., and eastward to Annapolis and the Eastern Shore of Maryland. U.S. Route 301 and Maryland Route 3 skim the eastern edge of the city, providing connections southward to Waldorf and La Plata and northward to Baltimore. Other state highways serving the city include Maryland Route 197, Maryland Route 214, Maryland Route 450 and Maryland Route 564.

It is served by Bowie State station on MARC's Penn Line.

== Economy ==
=== Largest employers ===
According to the city's 2018 Comprehensive Annual Financial Report, the largest employers in the city are:

#	Employer	# of Employees
1	Prince George's County Public Schools	1,178
2	Inovalon	605
3	City of Bowie	446
4	Bowie Baysox	260
5	P.G. County Public Safety Communications Control	195

== Education ==
=== Primary and secondary schools ===
==== Public schools ====
Bowie is within the Prince George's County Public Schools system.

Area residents are zoned to Benjamin Tasker Middle School or Samuel Ogle Middle School, and Bowie High School.

Elementary schools in Bowie include Heather Hills, Kenilworth, Northview, Pointer Ridge, Rockledge, Tulip Grove, Whitehall, and Yorktown Elementary Schools. Elementary schools not in Bowie and serving Bowie include High Bridge and Woodmore.

Samuel Ogle was previously a junior high school, then an elementary school; around 2005, PGCPS planned to convert it into a middle school.

From 1950 to 1964, during the era of legally-required racial segregation of schools, black students from Bowie attended Fairmont Heights High School, then near Fairmount Heights.

=== Colleges and universities ===
Bowie State University, located north of Bowie, Maryland, has been in operation since 1865.

=== Public libraries ===
Prince George's County Memorial Library System operates two public libraries in Bowie: Bowie Branch and South Bowie Branch.

== Notable people ==
- Kwame Adjeman-Pamboe, soccer player
- Spencer Anderson, offensive guard for the Pittsburgh Steelers
- Richard "Ricky" Arnold, NASA astronaut
- Khalid Balogun, soccer player
- Michael Bray, convicted conspirator in numerous bombings
- Scott Buete, soccer player and coach
- Eva Cassidy, singer and songwriter
- Daniel "Jungleman" Cates, professional poker player
- Alexis Cerritos, soccer player who represented the El Salvador national team
- JC Chasez, singer and member of *NSYNC
- Julius Chestnut, running back for the Tennessee Titans
- Anthony Cowan Jr., professional basketball player for the Promitheas Patras of the Greek Basket League
- Nick Cross, safety for the Indianapolis Colts
- Francis B. Francois, engineer and politician
- Kathie Lee Gifford, television host, singer, songwriter, comedian, and actress
- Jerai Grant, player for BC Wolves of the Lithuanian Basketball League
- Leo E. Green, former Maryland state senator and mayor of Bowie.
- Zion Johnson, offensive guard for the Los Angeles Chargers
- Abby Philip, CNN anchor
- Jan Scruggs, founder of the Vietnam Veterans Memorial Fund (VVMF)
- Chris Volz, singer for Flaw
- Benny Williams, college basketball player for the Syracuse Orange
- Caleb Williams, American football player for the USC Trojans, and 2022 Heisman Trophy winner
- Quincy Wilson, track runner
- Khoi Young, professional gymnast
- YungManny, American rapper
- 6ix, record producer

== Sports ==
Team	Sport	League	Championships	Venue
Chesapeake Baysox	Baseball	Eastern League	1 (2015)	Prince George's Stadium
Capital Seahawks	Basketball	94x50 League	0	Bowie State University

== Historic sites ==
Historic sites identified by the Maryland-National Capital Park and Planning Commission or listed on the National Register of Historic Places include:

- Belair
- Belair Stables
- Bowie Railroad Buildings
- Boyden House
- Fair Running (Maenner House)
- Don S. S. Goodloe House
- Harmon-Phelps House
- Ingersoll House
- Knights of St. John Hall
- Melford
- Mitchellville Storekeeper's House and Store Site
- Ryon House
- Sacred Heart Catholic Church
- Albert Smith House
- St. James Episcopal Chapel
- Straining House
- Williams Plains

== Parks ==
- Allen Pond Park
- Foxhill Park
- Buckingham Park
- Somerset Park
- Whitemarsh Park
- Jericho Park

== Sister Cities ==
In June 2016, Mayor Robinson gave honorary Bowie citizenship to Mayor Luigi Lucchi of Berceto, Italy, as part of an International Youth Festival being held there.
