= Odenton station =

Rail station in Anne Arundel County, Maryland, US

Odenton
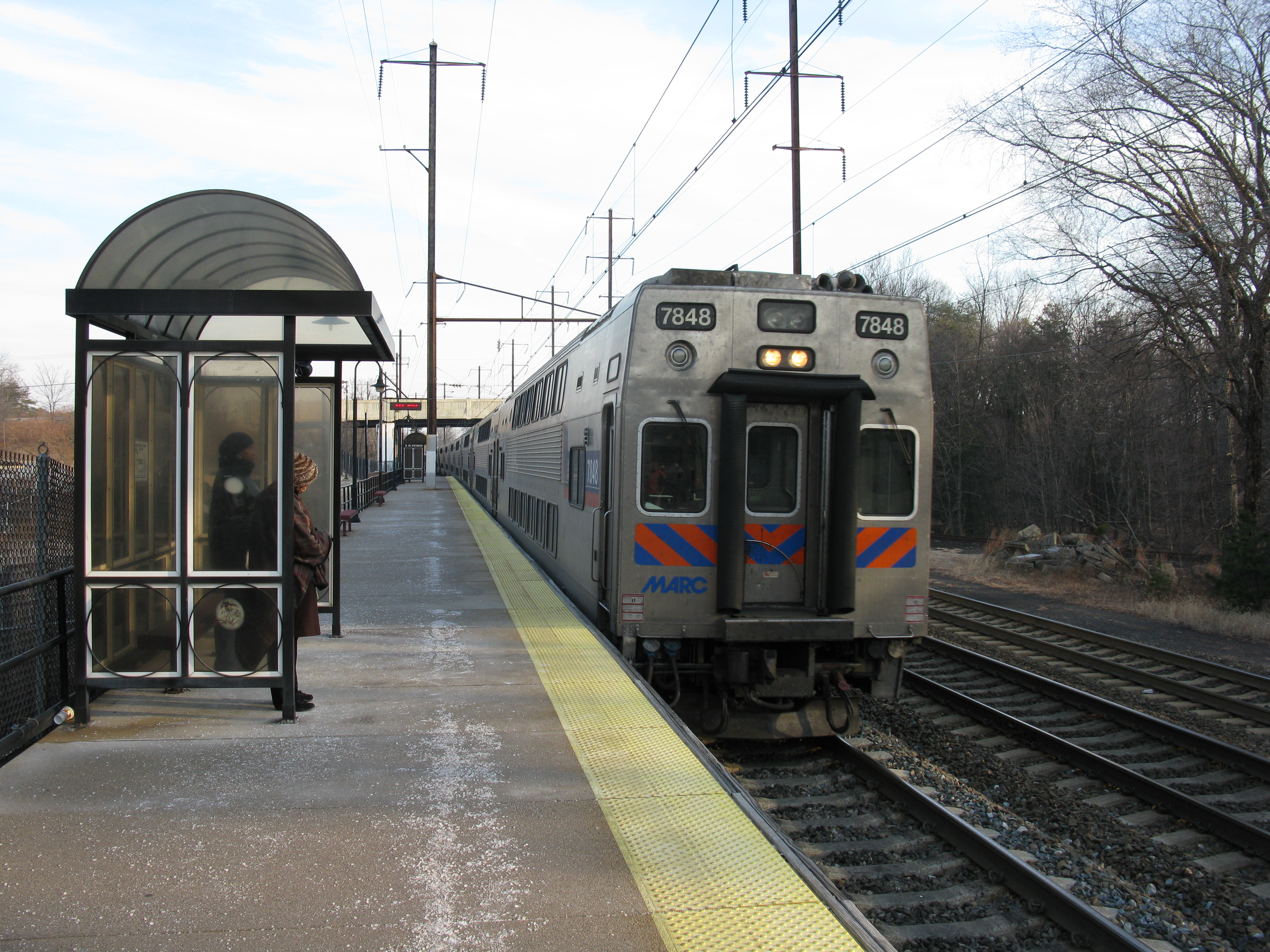
- MARC train at Odenton station platform in January 2009

General information
- Location: 1400 Odenton Road; Odenton, Maryland
- Coordinates: 39°5′13.6″N 76°42′22.6″W
- Owner: Amtrak
- Line: Amtrak Northeast Corridor
- Platforms: 2 side platforms
- Tracks: 3
- Connections: Anne Arundel County Office of Transportation: 202, Crofton Connector

Construction
- Parking: 1,977 spaces
- Cycle facilities: 5 lockers
- Accessible: Yes

History
- Opened: July 2, 1872 (B&P)
- Rebuilt: 1943 (PRR), 1989
- Electrified: 1935

Passengers
- 2018: 2,984 daily ▲20.8%

Services
Preceding station	MARC	Following station
Bowie State toward Union Station	Penn Line	BWI Airport toward Perryville
Former services
Preceding station	Amtrak	Following station
Bowie toward Washington, D.C.	Chesapeake	Baltimore Airport toward Philadelphia–Suburban
Preceding station	Pennsylvania Railroad	Following station
Patuxent toward Washington, D.C.	Philadelphia, Wilmington and Baltimore Railroad	Harman toward Philadelphia
Location

Odenton station is a passenger rail station on the MARC Penn Line. It is located along the Northeast Corridor; Amtrak trains operating along the corridor pass through but do not stop. Both platforms at the station are high-level and are among the longest in the MARC system.

== History ==
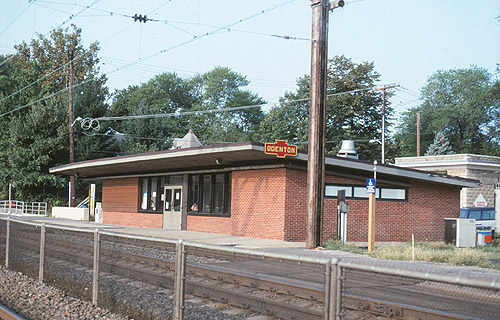
Odenton station in 1995, with PRR sign on the station house

The Odenton station was originally built in 1872 by the Baltimore and Potomac Railroad which was later merged into the Pennsylvania Railroad on November 1, 1902. The station survived the merger between the New York Central Railroad and the PRR that formed Penn Central. When Amtrak was formed in 1971, it initially retained very limited intercity service to the station – eventually dwindling to two trains each way, each day, Monday – Friday. Although the station building closed to the public at that time, it continued to be used as a maintenance-of-way storage facility.

Commuter passenger service has operated continuously from this station since prior to 1900. Since around 1989, the station has been served by MARC, a division of the Maryland Transit Administration (MTA) who continues to provide commuter service to the area. MARC service has expanded offers frequent daily service at the station Monday through Friday as well as expanded weekend and holiday service.

== Station layout ==
The station has two side platforms serving the outer tracks of the Northeast Corridor, with a tunnel connecting the two platforms.

== Connecting services ==
The National Security Agency (NSA) maintains a shuttle service from Odenton station to its Visitor Control Center at its headquarters at Fort George G. Meade; it has done so since 2005. In 2009 the U.S. Army established a similar shuttle service from Odenton station to the Army section of Fort Meade; the NSA operates this service, allowing garrison employees, persons with Fort Meade visitor passes, and U.S. Department of Defense IDs to board. In addition, Anne Arundel County's 202 and Crofton Connector shuttles service the station, providing a link to Annapolis, Maryland and Arundel Mills.
