= Bowie State station =

Rail station in Bowie, Maryland

Bowie State
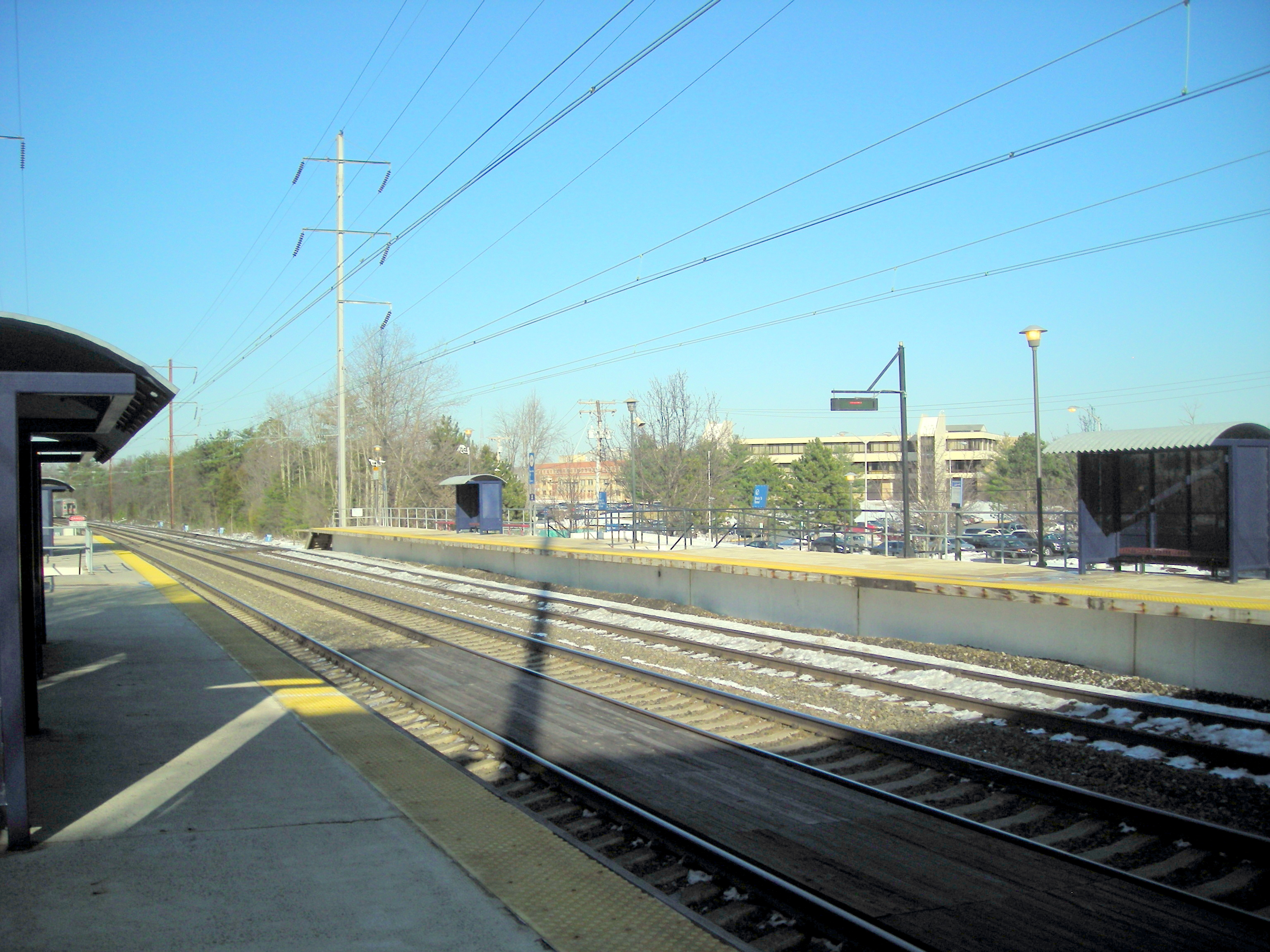
- Bowie State station platforms in March 2009

General information
- Location: 13900 Old Jericho Park Road; Bowie, Maryland
- Coordinates: 39°01′04″N 76°45′53″W
- Owner: Amtrak
- Line: Amtrak Northeast Corridor
- Platforms: 2 side platforms
- Tracks: 3

Construction
- Parking: 675 spaces
- Accessible: Yes

History
- Opened: February 27, 1989
- Electrified: 1935

Passengers
- 2018: 819 daily ▲6.2%

Services
Preceding station	MARC	Following station
Seabrook toward Union Station	Penn Line	Odenton toward Perryville
Location

Bowie State station is a regional rail station on the Northeast Corridor, located adjacent to the campus of Bowie State University in Bowie, Maryland. It is served by MARC Penn Line commuter rail trains. The station is located on a three-track section of the Northeast Corridor, with two side platforms next to the outer tracks.

== History ==
The Baltimore and Potomac Railroad (B&P) opened its main line in 1872, with a station at Bowie but not at Jericho Park. The B&P was merged into the Pennsylvania Railroad (PRR) in 1902. The PRR opened Jericho Park station, located at the modern station site, to serve the Maryland Normal and Industrial School (the predecessor to Bowie State College) around 1911.

The PRR folded into Penn Central in 1968. Conrail took over the ex-PRR Baltimore-Washington service, soon subsidized by the Maryland Department of Transportation, from Penn Central at its creation on April 1, 1976. Conrail operated service to the station until June 26, 1981. It was closed as the Jericho Park Road grade crossing was eliminated by the Laurel–Bowie Road overpass.

Bowie State station was opened on February 27, 1989, as a replacement for the Bowie station, 1.1 miles (1.8 km) to the south. Bowie State provided parking lots – not possible to construct at Bowie – and better road access to surrounding suburban areas. This was one of the first major station projects undertaken under the MARC branding.
