= Bowie Railroad Buildings =

Railway museum in Maryland, US

Bowie, MD
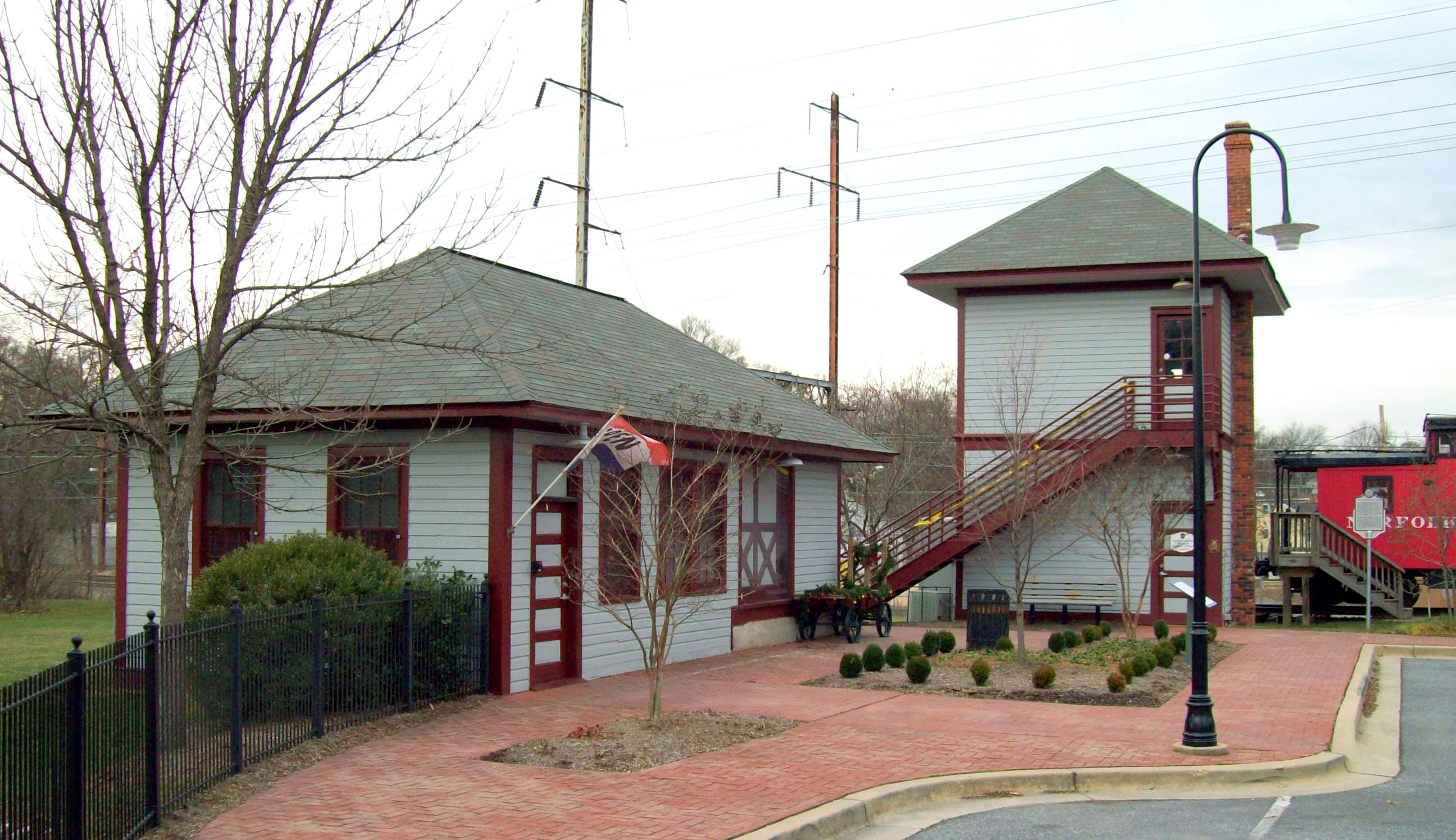
- Bowie Tower and freight station in December 2008

General information
- Location: 8614 Chestnut Avenue, Bowie, Maryland
- Operator: Baltimore and Potomac Railroad; Pennsylvania Railroad; Amtrak; MARC

History
- Opened: 1872
- Closed: 1989
- Electrified: January 28, 1935 (ceremonial); February 10, 1935 (regular service)

Former services
Preceding station	MARC	Following station
Seabrook toward Union Station	Penn Line Until 1989	Odenton toward Perryville
Preceding station	Amtrak	Following station
Capital Beltway toward Washington, D.C.	Chesapeake 1978–1983	Odenton toward Philadelphia–Suburban
Preceding station	Pennsylvania Railroad	Following station
Glendale toward Washington, D.C.	Philadelphia, Wilmington and Baltimore Railroad	Jericho Park toward Philadelphia
- Bowie Railroad Buildings
- U.S. National Register of Historic Places
- Interactive map of Bowie Railroad Buildings
- Coordinates: 39°0′26″N 76°46′46″W
- Area: less than one acre
- Built: 1913
- Architectural style: Queen Anne
- NRHP reference No.: 98001261
- Added to NRHP: November 4, 1998
Location

The Bowie Railroad Buildings comprise three small frame structures at the former Bowie train station, located at the junction of what is now the Northeast Corridor and the Pope's Creek Subdivision in the town center of Bowie, Maryland. The complex includes a single-story freight depot, a two-story interlocking tower, and an open passenger shed. The station was served by passenger trains from 1872 until 1989, when it was replaced by Bowie State station nearby. The buildings were restored in 1992 as the Bowie Railroad Museum and added to the National Register of Historic Places in 1998.

== History ==
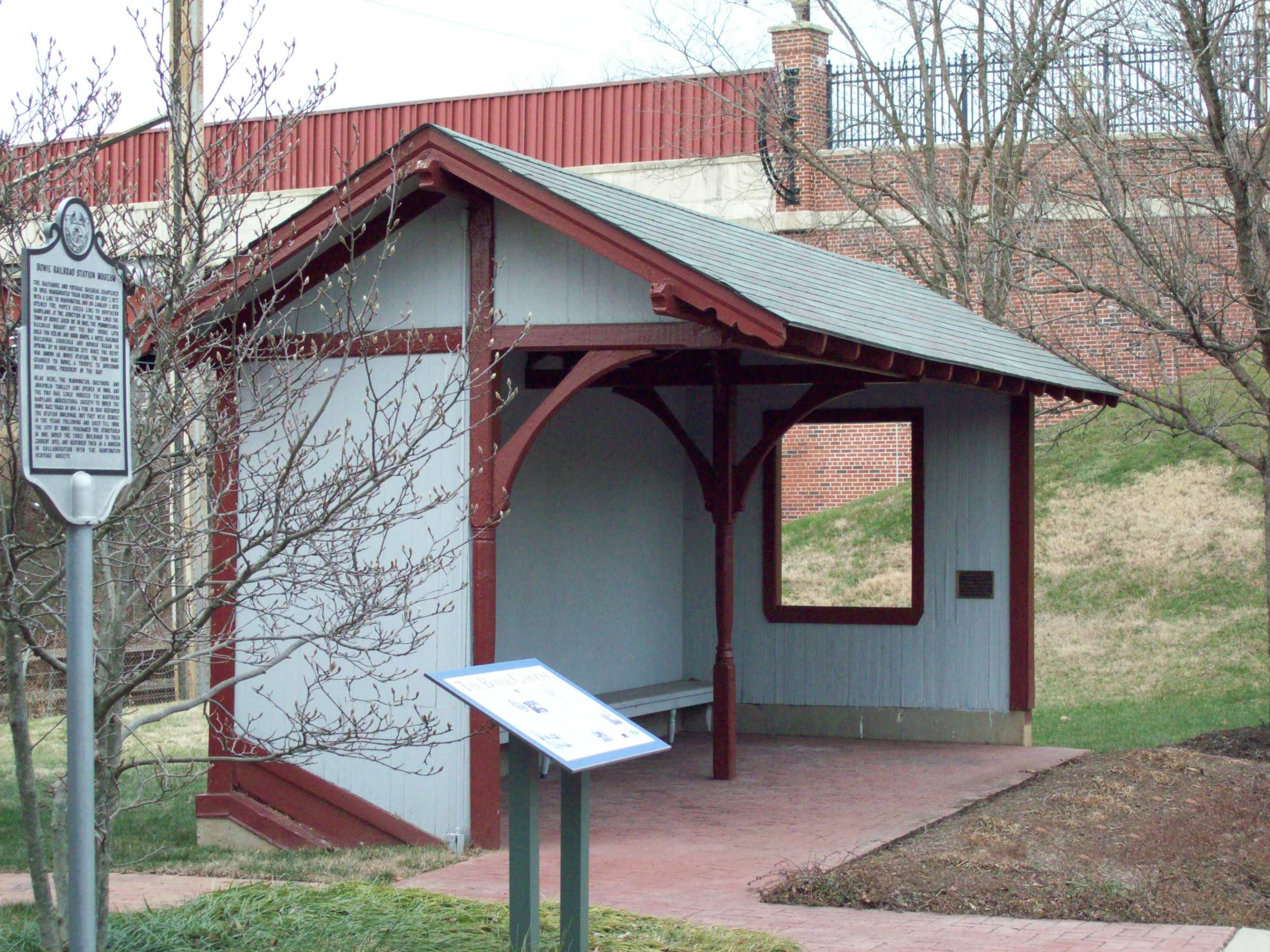
The 1930s-built passenger shed

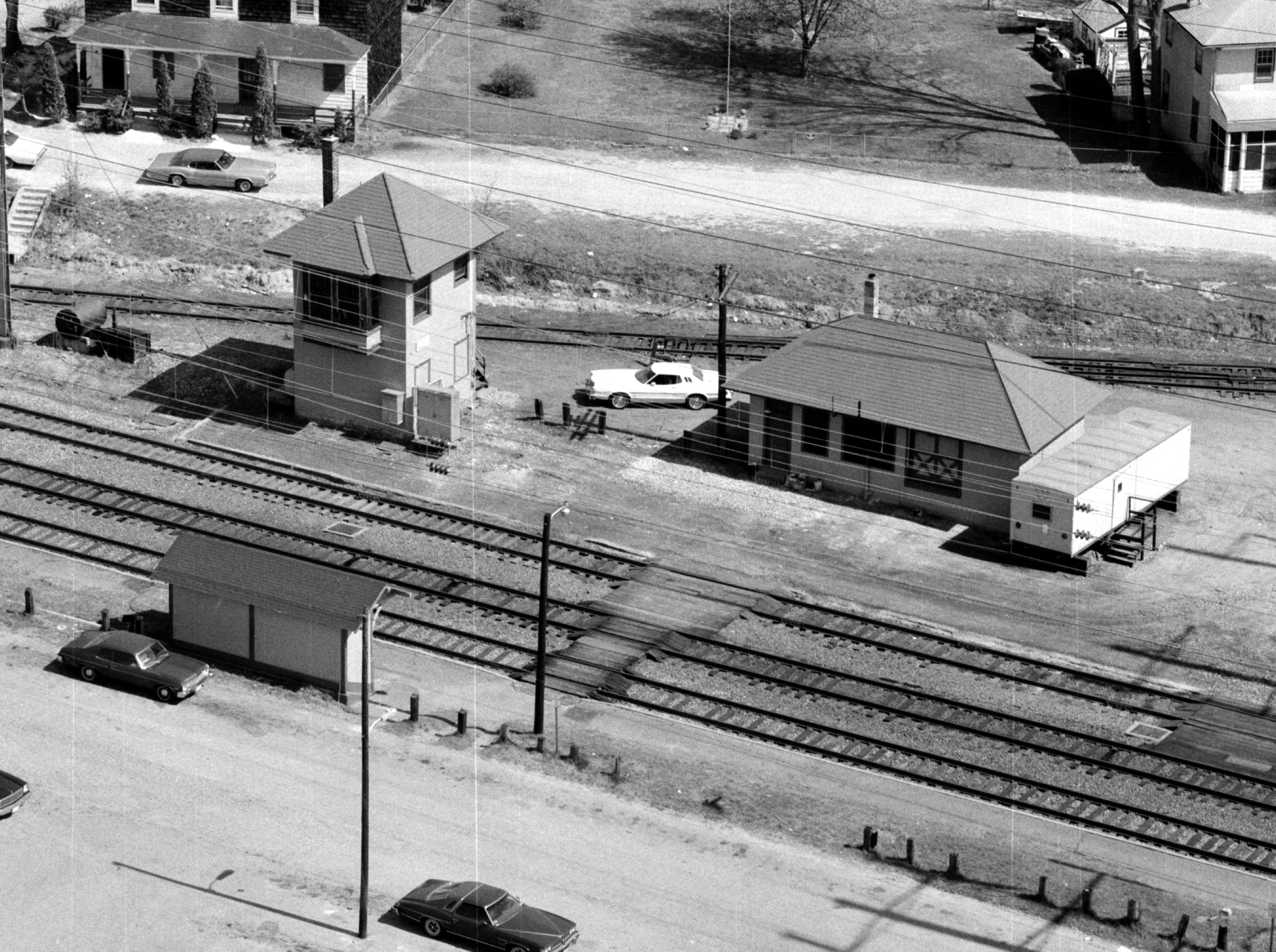
Aerial view of Bowie station in 1977

Even before its opening, the construction of the Baltimore and Potomac Railroad (B&P) prompted land speculation including the 1870 founding of Huntington City (renamed Bowie in 1880). In August 1870, Benjamin Plumb, who laid out the town, sold two lots to the railroad under the condition they be used as a station and an engine house by 1875.

The line opened from Baltimore to Washington, D.C. via Huntington on July 2, 1872. The section from Washington to Bowie was originally a branch line but soon became the more important route. The Pope's Creek Branch, the original mainline, opened from Huntington in January 1873. By this time, Bowie station was open at the junction. It was named after Oden Bowie, the railroad's proprietor, who served as the governor of Maryland from 1869 to 1872.

In the 1880s, the development of the interlocking system allowed a single worker in an interlocking tower to control multiple railroad switches by means of electrical controls. The original Bowie Tower, which controlled the junction of the mainline, opened in the 1890s. It was destroyed by a fire in 1910. The Pennsylvania Railroad (PRR), which had controlled the B&P since the 1870s and acquired it outright in 1902, immediately constructed a replacement tower.

In the early 1930s, the PRR began straightening and upgrading the main line. A new station building was built at the same site, with a small passenger shelter across the tracks. In 1934, the PRR moved a 1913-built interlocking tower from Severn to Bowie Junction. Passenger service from Bowie to Pope's Creek ended on October 29, 1949, though the line continued to be used for freight service.

=== Amtrak and MARC ===
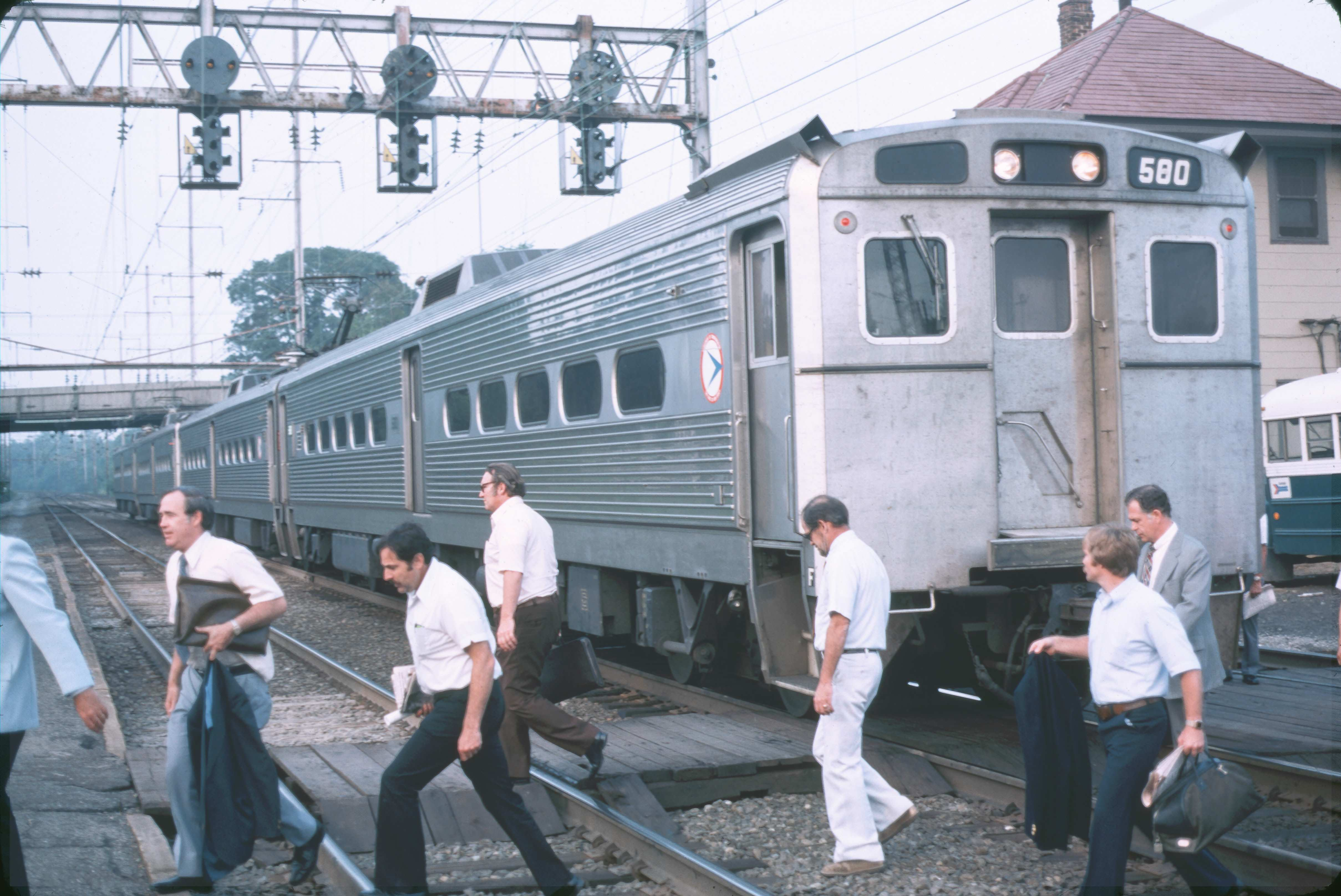
Conrail commuter train at Bowie in 1978

The PRR was merged into the Penn Central Transportation Company in 1968. When Amtrak took over intercity passenger service on the line from Penn Central in May 1971, Bowie and most other local stations between Washington, and Wilmington were left with only limited commuter service still operated by Penn Central. Conrail took over the unsubsidized Baltimore-Washington service at its creation on April 1, 1976; the Maryland Department of Transportation (MDOT) began subsidizing the service soon after.

In 1978, Amtrak began operating the commuter-oriented Chesapeake between Washington and Philadelphia, making local stops including at Bowie. Amtrak took over the operation of the Baltimore-Washington service (retitled AMDOT) under contract to MDOT on January 1, 1983. Now largely redundant to Amtrak intercity and the AMDOT regional service, the Chesapeake was cut on October 30, 1983.

The MARC brand replaced AMDOT in 1984. On February 27, 1989, MARC service moved to Bowie State station at Bowie State University, which had room for a large park-and-ride lot and more direct access to Route 197. Bowie Tower was used until 1986, when the signal and interlocking system on the line was computerized. The three buildings – station, shelter, and tower – were boarded up and unused.

A 2009 Maryland Transit Administration analyzed the possibility of restoring passenger rail service to La Plata and Lexington Park via the Pope's Creek Branch. Under that proposal, a Bowie Center station would have been built to the south near Route 50 to serve the new MARC branch.

=== Bowie Railroad Museum ===
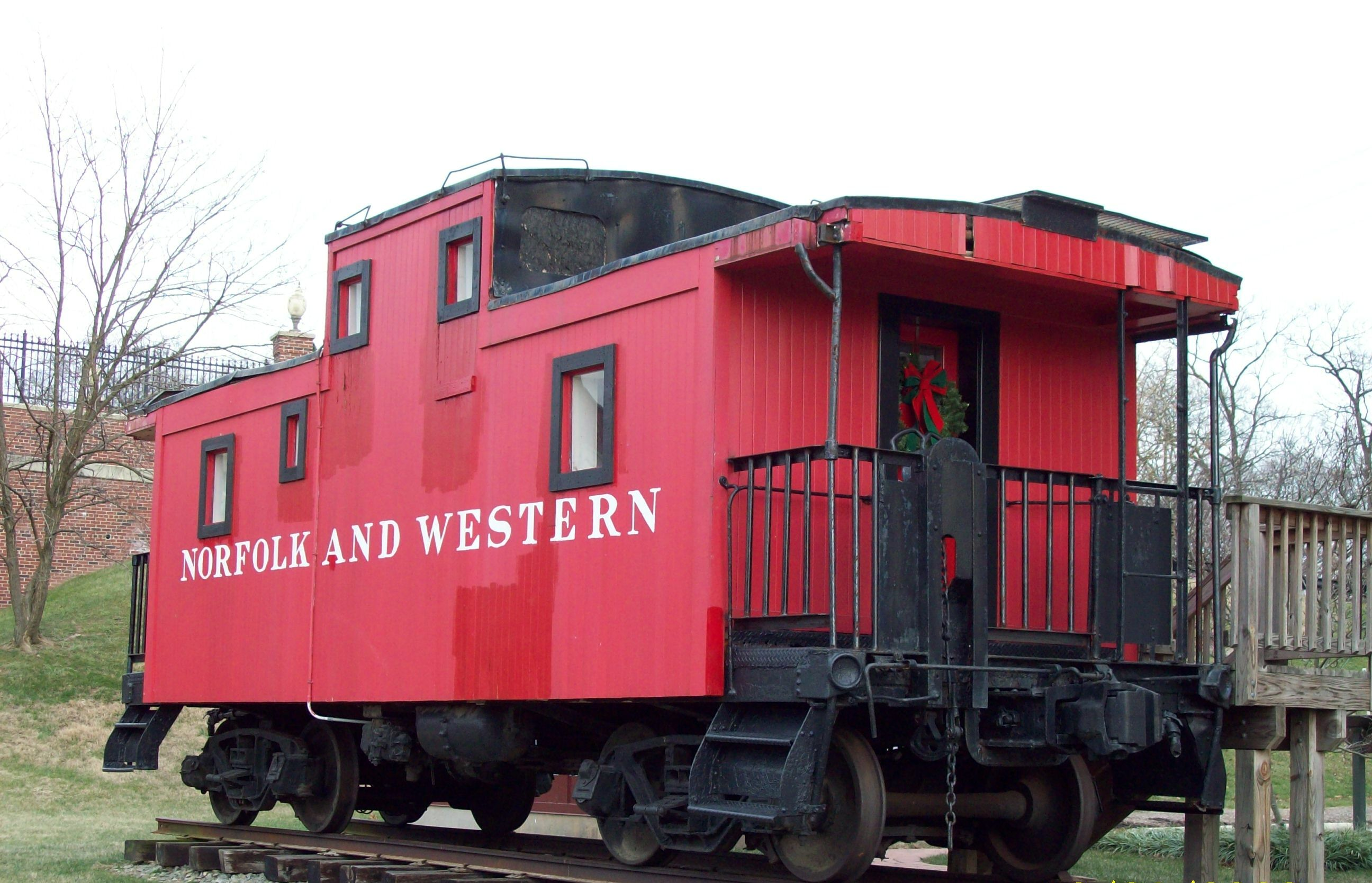
Restored Norfolk & Western Railway caboose at the Bowie Railroad Museum

In 1992, the City of Bowie bought the buildings and moved them about 100 feet (30 m) away from the mainline off Amtrak property. The Maryland Historical Trust assisted with restoration, under which the buildings were restored to their Pennsylvania Railroad livery of gray with burgundy trim. The complex of buildings are significant for their contribution to the development of rail transportation in the region, and as examples of the types of buildings commonly associated with small-scale rail junctions in the early 20th century. The railroad depot structures in Old Bowie are rare survivors of the numerous early 20th century railway stations in the Washington, D.C., metropolitan area.

The buildings were reopened as the Huntington Railroad Museum, later the Bowie Railroad Museum, a small railway museum maintained by the city government. A wooden 1922 Norfolk and Western Railroad caboose was also located on the museum grounds. Its deteriorating condition led to it being replaced in August 2016 by a former B&O Railroad caboose obtained from the B&O Railroad Museum in Baltimore.

The station building houses exhibits and artifacts, while the tower contains the National Railroad Historical Society's Martin O'Rourke Railroad Research Library. The buildings were added to the National Register of Historic Places as the Bowie Railroad Buildings in 1998.
