= Williams Plains (Bowie, Maryland) =

Historic house in Maryland, United States

- U.S. National Register of Historic Places
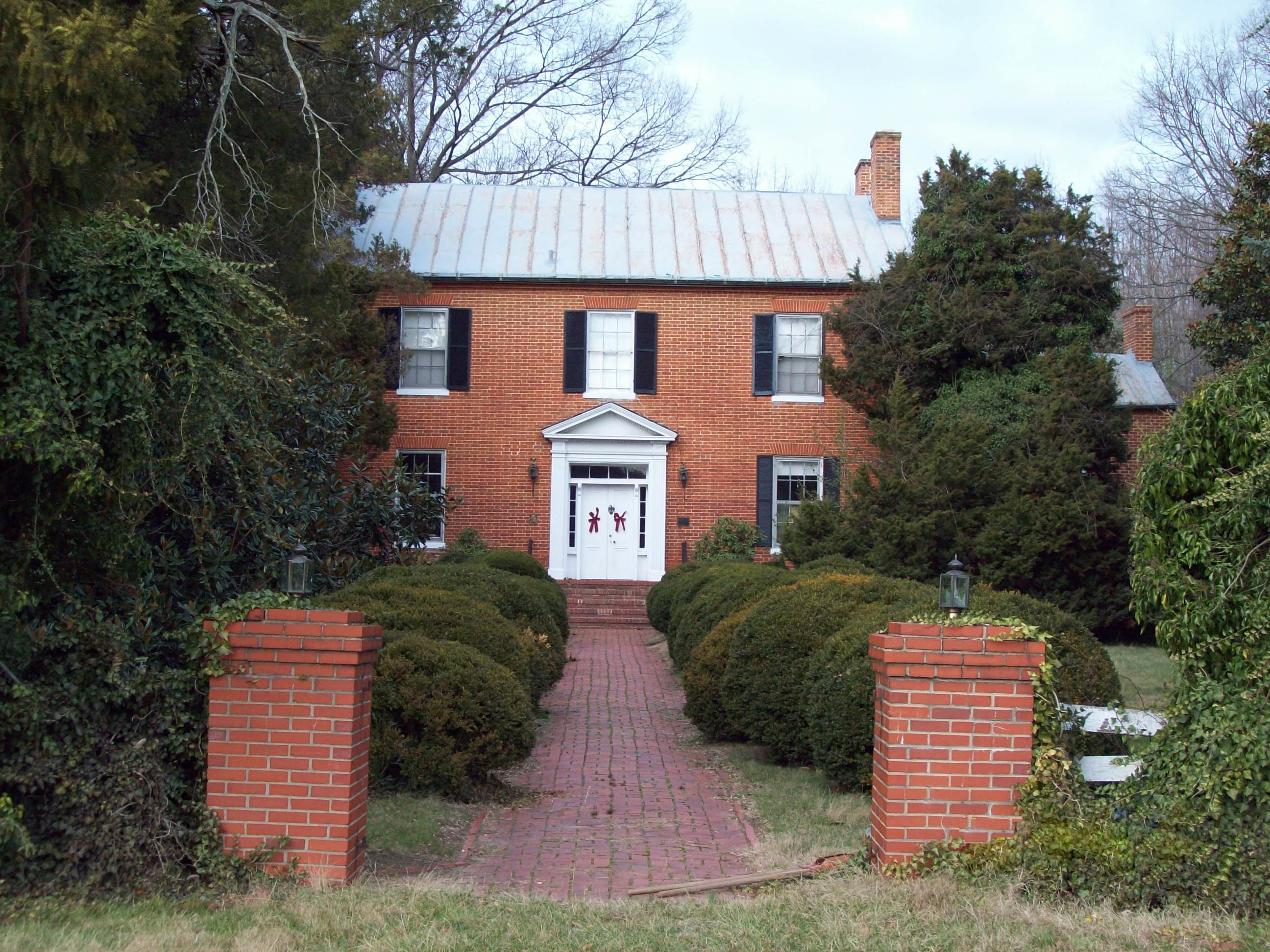
- Williams Plains South Front, December 2008

- Location within Maryland Location within the United States
- Location: MD 3, White Marsh Recreational Park, Bowie, Maryland
- Coordinates: 38°58′35″N 76°43′19″W
- Area: 4.9 acres (2.0 ha)
- Architectural style: Classical Revival, Greek Revival
- NRHP reference No.: 80004329
- Added to NRHP: November 28, 1980

Williams Plains is a historic home located in the White Marsh Recreational Park at Bowie in Prince George's County, Maryland, United States.

The house was built for the Hon. John Johnson (1770-1824), judge of the Maryland Court of Appeals, who purchased the property in 1812.

It is a 2 1/2-story brick house, with a Flemish bond south facade and six-course common bond used for the remaining walls. It is an early- to mid-19th-century brick house which is significant primarily for the Greek Revival–influenced interior decorative detailing which remains almost completely intact and thus is an excellent and somewhat rare record of domestic architecture in Prince George's County in the first half of the 19th century. The dominant design elements which characterize the decorative detailing include Greek Revival influenced trim, mantels, and paneled doors. A much lower 2 1/2-story wing, likely dating to 1942, projects from the northern portion of the east side. The bricks of the wing are laid in stretcher bond, and is a veneer-over-frame construction.

Williams Plains was listed on the National Register of Historic Places in 1980.

== Gallery ==
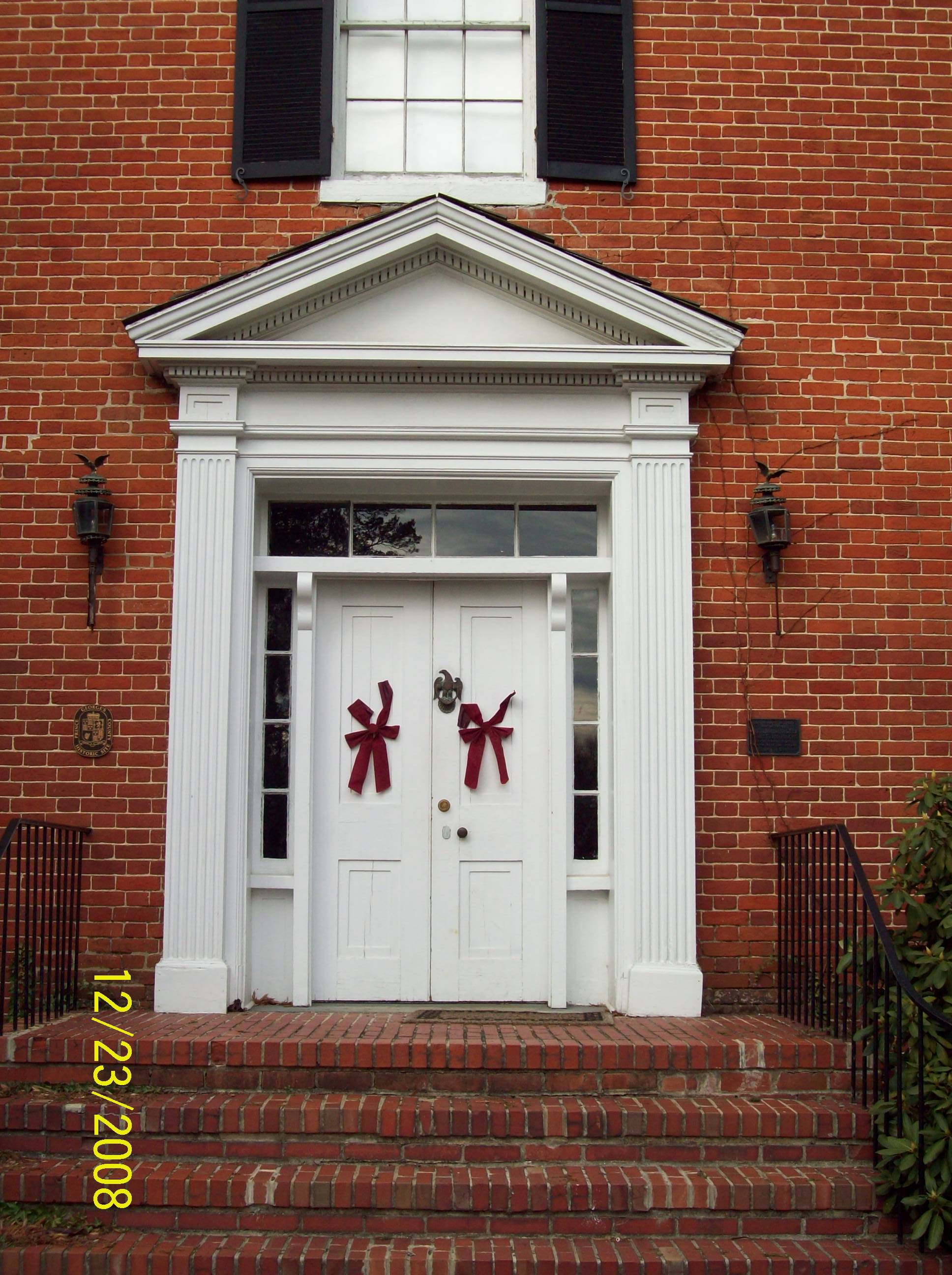
Williams Plains Door Detail, December 2008

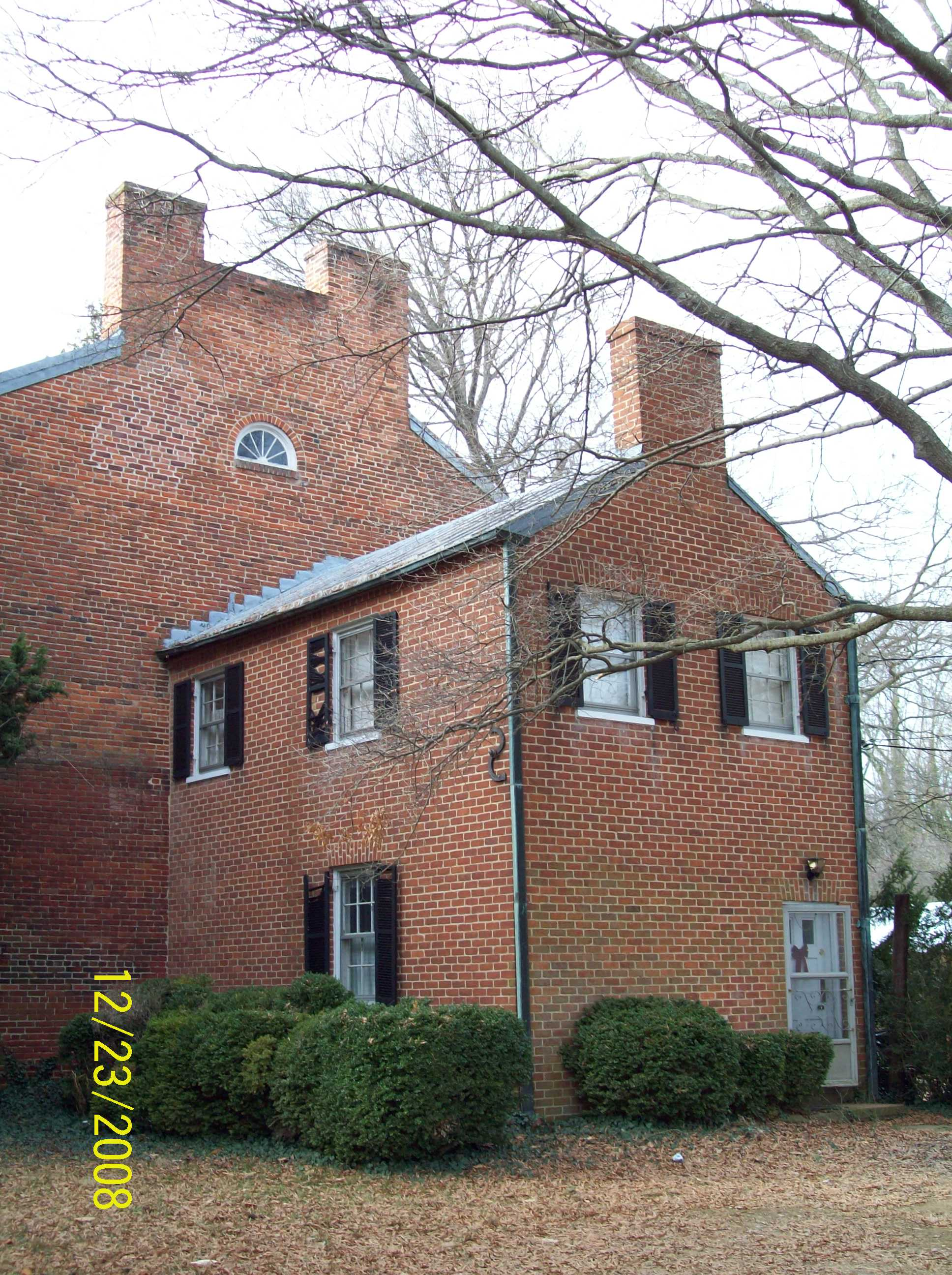
Williams Plains East Addition, December 2008

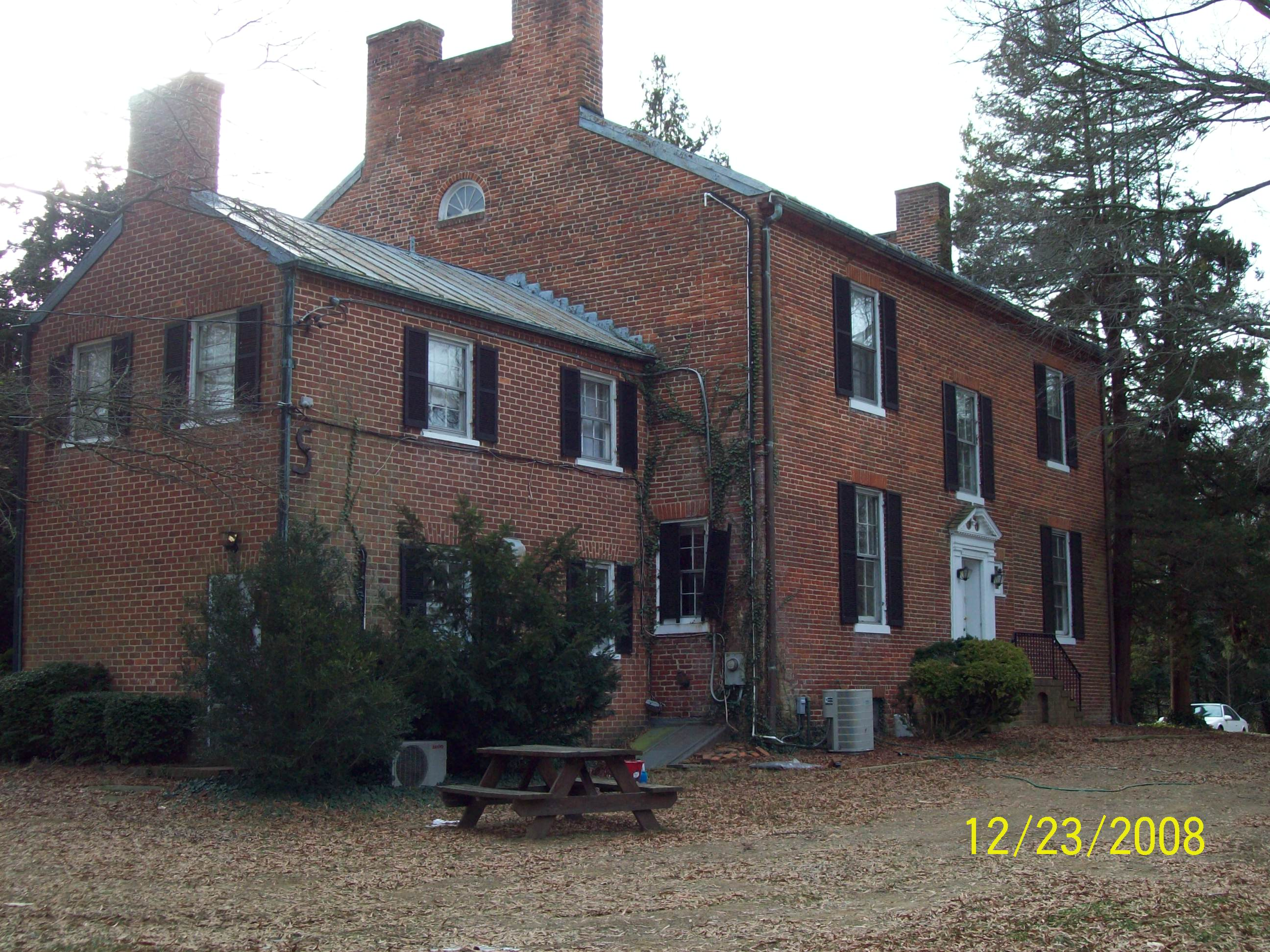
Williams Plains North Front, December 2008
