= Lambros D. Callimahos =

US Army and early NSA Cryptologist (1910-1977)

Lambros Demetrios Callimahos (December 16, 1910 – October 28, 1977) was a US Army cryptologist and a flute player.

== Early life and education ==
Callimahos was born in Alexandria of Greek parents; the family emigrated to the United States when he was four. His father was a journalist.

His main interests at school were in chemistry, physics and medicine. He did not show interest in music until the age of fourteen when he entered high school in Asbury Park.

Callimahos earned a degree in law from Rutgers in accord with his fathers' wishes, but attended Juilliard music school at the age of nineteen and graduated with a degree in 1933. While he started at the bottom of the class, he became head of his class in his second year after encouragement from his teacher, Arthur Lora. After graduation, he continued study in Europe.

== Musical career ==
His musical debut was in Munich in 1935 and was heralded as Meisterfloetist. He also played in Vienna and that autumn played an all-Bach programme in Munich, consisting of the seven sonatas and his own transcription for flute and harpsichord of the B-Minor suite. He had a two-year tour of recitals in Europe and was appointed to a professorship in the Mozarteum. Two CDs of his performances were recorded and released.

In April 1937, he had his first United States debut in The Town Hall. He continued to tour both in Europe and the United States.

== World War II ==
He joined the United States Army in 1941, hoping his interest in cryptology could be put to service.

He taught Italian and cryptanalysis at Fort Monmouth. He enrolled in a Japanese course and eventually served as a Signals Intelligence officer in New Delhi.

== Later career ==
After World War II, he was assigned to the Army Security Agency as assistant to William F. Friedman. When the National Security Agency was formed, both men joined it. During the 1950s he developed the course CA-400, an expansion of Friedman's own intensive-study course. Graduates of the course became members of the Dundee Society. As part of this course he devised the Zendian Problem. He also revised some of Friedman's own work to produce the text Military Cryptanalytics.

According to the official NSA website, he helped establish the NSA Technical Journal in 1955 and served as technical advisor for the rest of his career. Callimahos also "played a crucial role in shaping cryptologic development at NSA."

Health problems forced his retirement in 1976.
