= Aegean Park Press =

Aegean Park Press was a publisher based in Walnut Creek, California, specializing in cryptology, military intelligence, contract bridge and Mayan languages. The company's books on cryptology were "mostly reprints of fairly advanced texts, "[i]ncluding at least 16 books by World War II cryptologists William F. Friedman, Lambros D. Callimahos, and Solomon Kullback. It published more than 50 books related to cryptology and a smaller number of books on other areas such as military intelligence." It did most of its business by direct mail.

It was founded in 1973 by Wayne Barker (1922-2001).

One of the company's ostensible customers has reported that it "ceased to exist either in lat[e] 2011 or early 2012". Better Business Bureau reported it was out of business as of January 2014.
