= Friendship Annex =

National Security Agency facility complex in Linthicum, Maryland

Coordinates: 39.2008°N 76.6884°W

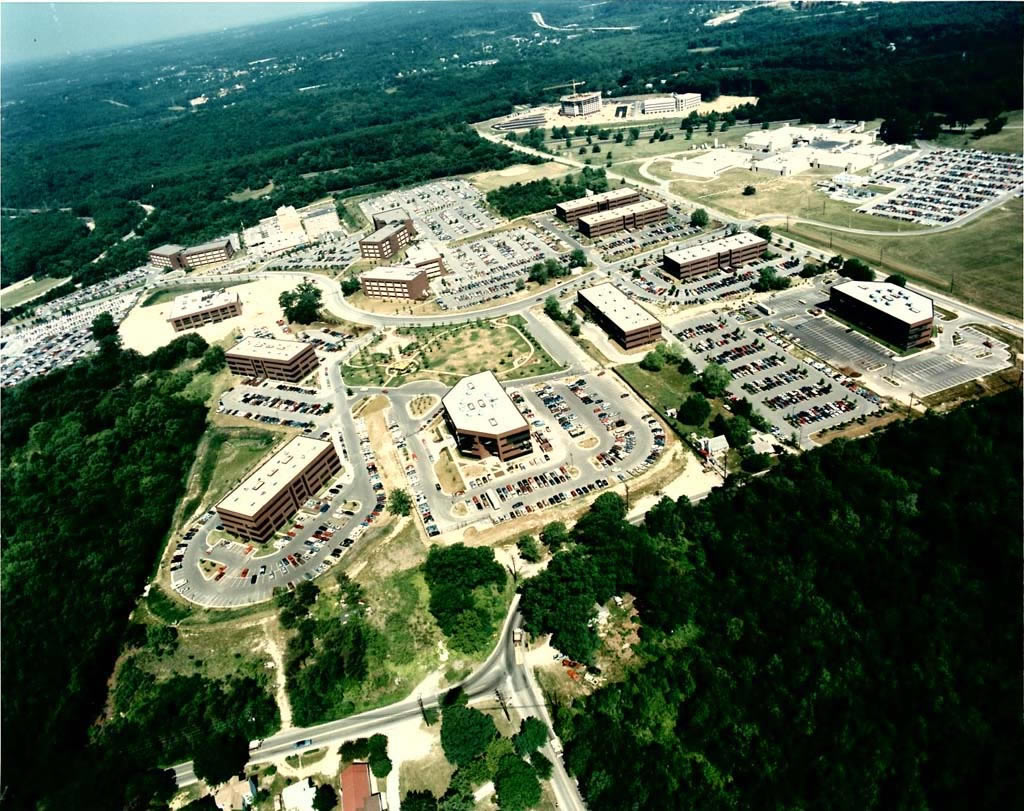
The Friendship Annex complex, 1990

The Friendship Annex, also known as FANX or FANEX, is a National Security Agency (NSA) facility complex located in Linthicum, Maryland, near the Baltimore Washington International Airport (BWI). Established in the 1970s, the complex consists of multiple buildings and serves multiple roles as a cyber espionage station, electronic intelligence processing facility, and NSA Broadcast Network television studio. It is also the primary campus of the National Cryptologic School.

== History ==
Friendship Annex was established in early 1970 after the NSA outgrew the office space of its headquarters at Fort Meade, Maryland. The agency leased several buildings in the Airport Square Technology Park near BWI, located 20–25 minutes drive time from its headquarters, and named the new facility after the airport, which was at one time named Friendship International Airport. The buildings comprised two seven-story towers and two two-story buildings, labeled FANX I, II, III and IV. One of the two-story buildings was later leased to NASA. The NSA expanded the size of Friendship Annex, completing the complex in the 1990s. Today the complex covers 1,000,000 square feet (93,000 m^{2}) of leased space and houses an estimated 12,000 NSA personnel. A number of intelligence contractors are also co-located within or near the technology park.

== Functions ==
Friendship Annex serves multiple roles. It functions, in part, as a cyber espionage station. Teams of NSA hackers within the facility attempt to penetrate the digital communications of foreign governments both friendly and unfriendly to the United States. In addition, teams of "defenders" are tasked with monitoring penetrations and attempted penetrations of U.S. government computer systems. Friendship Annex also conducts the NSA's electronic intelligence (ELINT) signals analysis processing.

Friendship Annex is the primary campus of the National Cryptologic School. The school offers a wide range of courses in cryptology, from basic training to advanced techniques for senior staff, as well as courses in language, leadership, education, and business. The school is located in the seven-story FANX IV building.

The complex also serves as the production studio for the NSA Broadcast Network, which produces live, closed-circuit television programs such as NSA Talk—similar to Larry King Live and hosting guests such as former NSA director Kenneth Minihan—and Newsmagazine, all exclusively for NSA staff. The television facility is completely soundproof, and contains two video-edit suites, a sound booth, an audio-sweetening room, a studio, and 3D computer graphics capability. Friendship Annex is connected to the NSA headquarters and other Washington-area facilities by the Washington Area Wideband System, a coaxial cable network that was constructed in the mid-1970s.

Friendship Annex is where the NSA conducts its new employee screening. In particular, polygraph tests are administered to prospective employees in the FANX III building. Following the polygraph test, recruits undergo a series of psychological tests. In all, prospective employees spend about 48 hours in the FANX facility undergoing preemployment testing.

== See also ==
- National Security Agency
- National Cryptologic School
- Special Collection Service
- Baltimore–Washington International Airport
