= Maryland Route 346 =

Highway in Maryland

Maryland Route 346
- Maryland Route 346 highlighted in red

Route information
- Maintained by MDSHA and City of Salisbury
- Length: 23.72 mi (38.17 km)
- Existed: 1966–present

Major junctions
- West end: US 50 Bus. in Salisbury
- MD 353 in Pittsville; MD 354 in Willards; MD 610 in Whaleyville; MD 818 in Berlin; MD 377 in Berlin; US 113 in Berlin
- East end: US 50 near Berlin

Location
- Country: United States
- State: Maryland
- Counties: Wicomico, Worcester

Highway system
- Maryland highway system; Interstate; US; State; Scenic Byways
← MD 344	→ MD 347

Maryland Route 346 (MD 346) is a state highway in the U.S. state of Maryland. The state highway runs 23.72 miles (38.17 km) from U.S. Route 50 Business (US 50 Business) in Salisbury east to US 50 in Berlin. MD 346 is the old alignment of US 50 between Salisbury and Berlin, connecting those cities with Parsonsburg, Pittsville, and Willards in eastern Wicomico County and Whaleyville in northern Worcester County. Much of what is now MD 346 was built as the original state road between Salisbury and Ocean City in the mid-1910s. The highway was designated US 213 in 1927 and changed to US 50 in 1949. MD 346 was first applied to Church Street in Salisbury in the 1940s; this designation was removed in 1954. MD 346 was reassigned in the mid-1960s to the old alignments of US 50 left behind after US 50's bypass of Berlin opened in the late 1950s and the US 50 divided highway was completed between Salisbury and Berlin in the mid-1960s.

== Route description ==
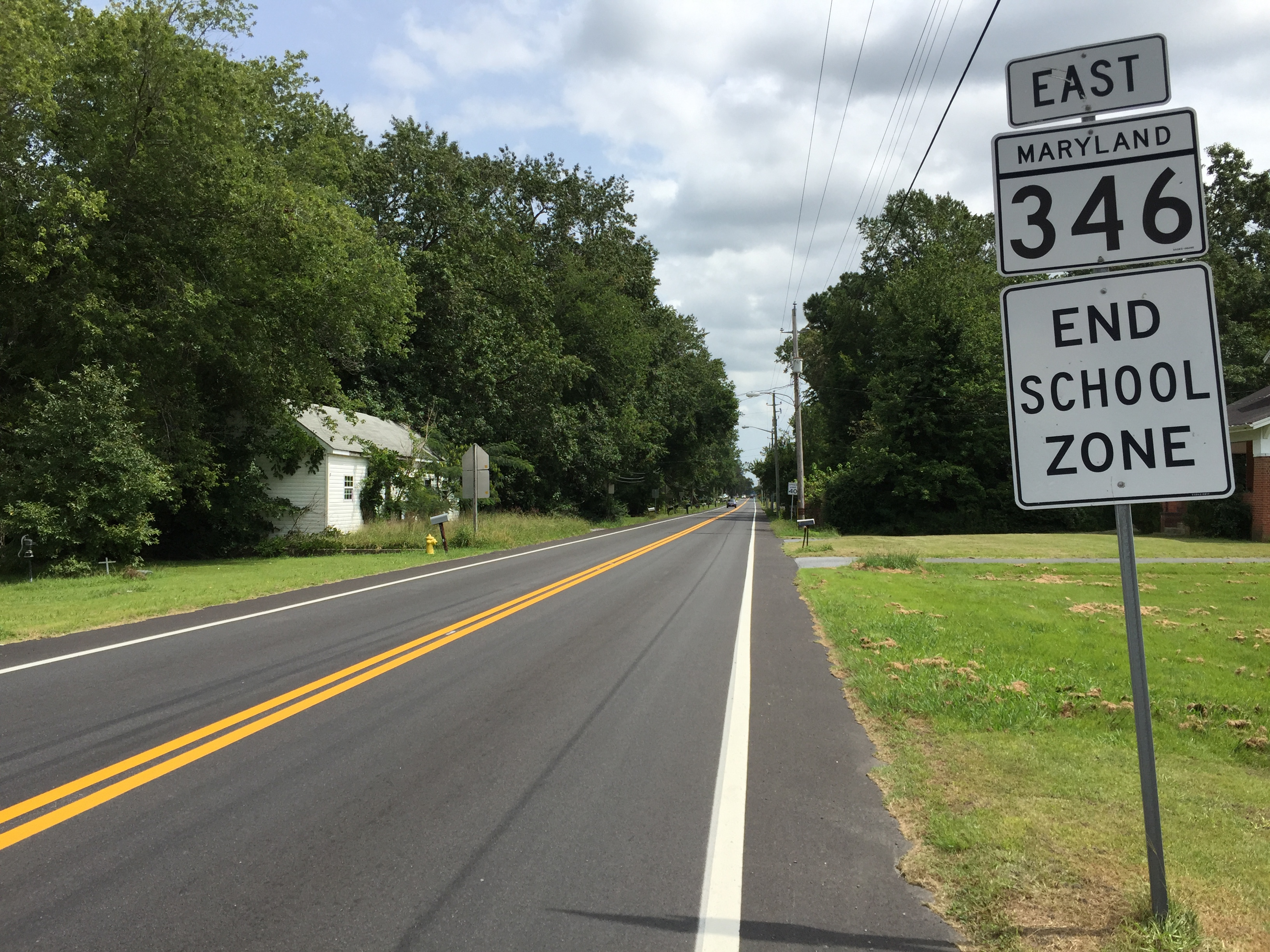
View east along MD 346 at MD 353 in Pittsville

MD 346 begins at an intersection with US 50 Business (Salisbury Parkway) in Salisbury. Main Street continues west into downtown Salisbury on the other side of US 50 Business. MD 346 heads northeast as Main Street, a two-lane undivided road maintained by the city of Salisbury. The state highway veers east at Church Street. At the city limit of Salisbury, state maintenance begins and the name of the highway changes to Old Ocean City Road. MD 346 passes under the Salisbury Bypass (US 13 and US 50) without access and continues east through a mix of farmland and scattered residences, crossing Beaverdam Creek. MD 346 passes through the unincorporated community of Parsonsburg and along the edge of the town of Pittsville, where the highway intersects MD 353 (Gumboro Road/Sixty Foot Road). The state highway next passes through Willards, where the highway meets the northern end of MD 354 (Powellville Road). After crossing Burnt Mill Branch, MD 346 crosses the Pocomoke River and enters Worcester County.

MD 346 continues east as Old Ocean City Boulevard, passing along the southern edge of Whaleyville, where the highway intersects MD 610 (Whaleyville Road). The state highway curves southeast and crosses over MD 90 (Ocean City Expressway) with no access, then turns south through the hamlet of St. Martin before intersecting US 50 (Ocean Gateway). MD 346 turns southeast, paralleling US 50 for a while before turning south toward the center of Berlin. Upon entering the town limits of Berlin, the state highway curves east to intersect MD 818 (Main Street). MD 346 has a grade crossing of the Maryland and Delaware Railroad's Snow Hill Line track, then intersects the northern terminus of MD 377 (Williams Street) immediately before an intersection with US 113 (Worcester Highway). The state highway passes south of Atlantic General Hospital and veers northeast to its eastern terminus at a tangent intersection with US 50.

== History ==
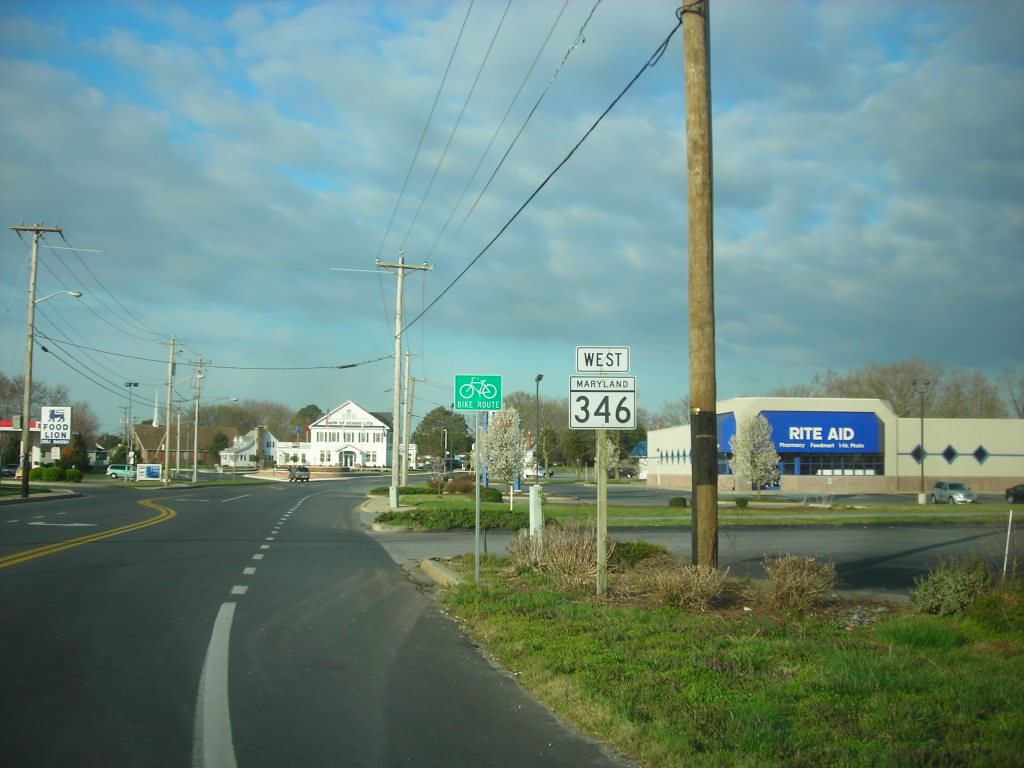
MD 346 westbound past US 113 in Berlin

The original highway between Salisbury and Ocean City, which followed much of which is now MD 346, was marked for improvement as a state road by the Maryland State Roads Commission in 1909. This highway was paved from Salisbury to Berlin in 1914 and from Berlin toward Ocean City in 1915. The road followed present-day MD 346 with two exceptions: the highway exited Salisbury on Church Street; and in Berlin, the state road followed Main Street south to the downtown area, then northeast toward Ocean City on Williams Street before rejoining MD 346's course. Main Street in Salisbury was extended east from the downtown area to its present intersection with Church Street in 1925 and 1926. In Berlin, the cut-off between Main Street and Williams Street was completed by 1927. US 213 was assigned to the Salisbury – Ocean City road in 1927. The U.S. Highway originally followed Church Street out of downtown Salisbury, while Main Street was also a state highway. In 1940, the two highways swapped streets, with US 213 following Main Street and the other highway using Church Street from US 13 (now US 13 Business) to the intersection of Main Street and Church Street on the east side of Salisbury. That other highway was marked MD 346 by 1946 at the latest. MD 346 was removed from Church Street in Salisbury in 1954. US 50 replaced US 213 from Wye Mills to Ocean City in 1949. US 50's bypass of Berlin was completed in 1958. Salisbury Parkway (now US 50 Business) from MD 349 to Main Street was completed by 1964 and US 50's four-lane divided highway between MD 346's western terminus and the US 50–MD 346 intersection west of Berlin opened in 1965. MD 346 was assigned to the old alignment of US 50 from Salisbury to west of Berlin in 1966 and through Berlin in 1967.

== Junction list ==
County	Location	mi	km	Destinations	Notes
Wicomico	Salisbury	0.00	0.00	US 50 Bus. (Salisbury Parkway) / Main Street west – Cambridge, Ocean City	Western terminus
Wicomico	Pittsville	9.37	15.08	MD 353 (Gumboro Road / Sixty Foot Road) – Gumboro, DE	
Wicomico	Willards	12.94	20.82	MD 354 south (Powellville Road) / Main Street north – Powellville	Northern terminus of MD 354
Worcester	Whaleyville	15.39	24.77	MD 610 (Whaleyville Road) – Selbyville	
Worcester	Berlin	20.13	32.40	US 50 (Ocean Gateway) – Salisbury, Ocean City	
Worcester	Berlin	22.34	35.95	MD 818 (Main Street)	
Worcester	Berlin	22.82	36.73	MD 377 south (Williams Street)	Northern terminus of MD 377
Worcester	Berlin	22.91	36.87	US 113 (Worcester Highway) – Snow Hill, Selbyville	
Worcester	Berlin	23.72	38.17	US 50 (Ocean Gateway) – Salisbury, Ocean City	Eastern terminus
1.000 mi = 1.609 km; 1.000 km = 0.621 mi
