= Maryland Route 354 =

State highway in Maryland, United States

Maryland Route 354
- Maryland Route 354 highlighted in red

Route information
- Maintained by MDSHA
- Length: 14.98 mi (24.11 km)
- Existed: 1927–present

Major junctions
- South end: MD 12 near Snow Hill
- MD 374 in Powellville; MD 350 in Powellville; US 50 in Willards
- North end: MD 346 in Willards

Location
- Country: United States
- State: Maryland
- Counties: Worcester, Wicomico

Highway system
- Maryland highway system; Interstate; US; State; Scenic Byways
← MD 353	→ MD 355

Maryland Route 354 (MD 354) is a state highway in the U.S. state of Maryland. The state highway runs 14.98 miles (24.11 km) from MD 12 near Snow Hill north to MD 346 in Willards. MD 354 parallels the Pocomoke River, connecting eastern Wicomico County and northwestern Worcester with Snow Hill. The state highway was first constructed from Willards in the mid-1910s. The remainder of MD 354 was completed in the late 1920s and early 1930s, with little change in the highway since.

== Route description ==
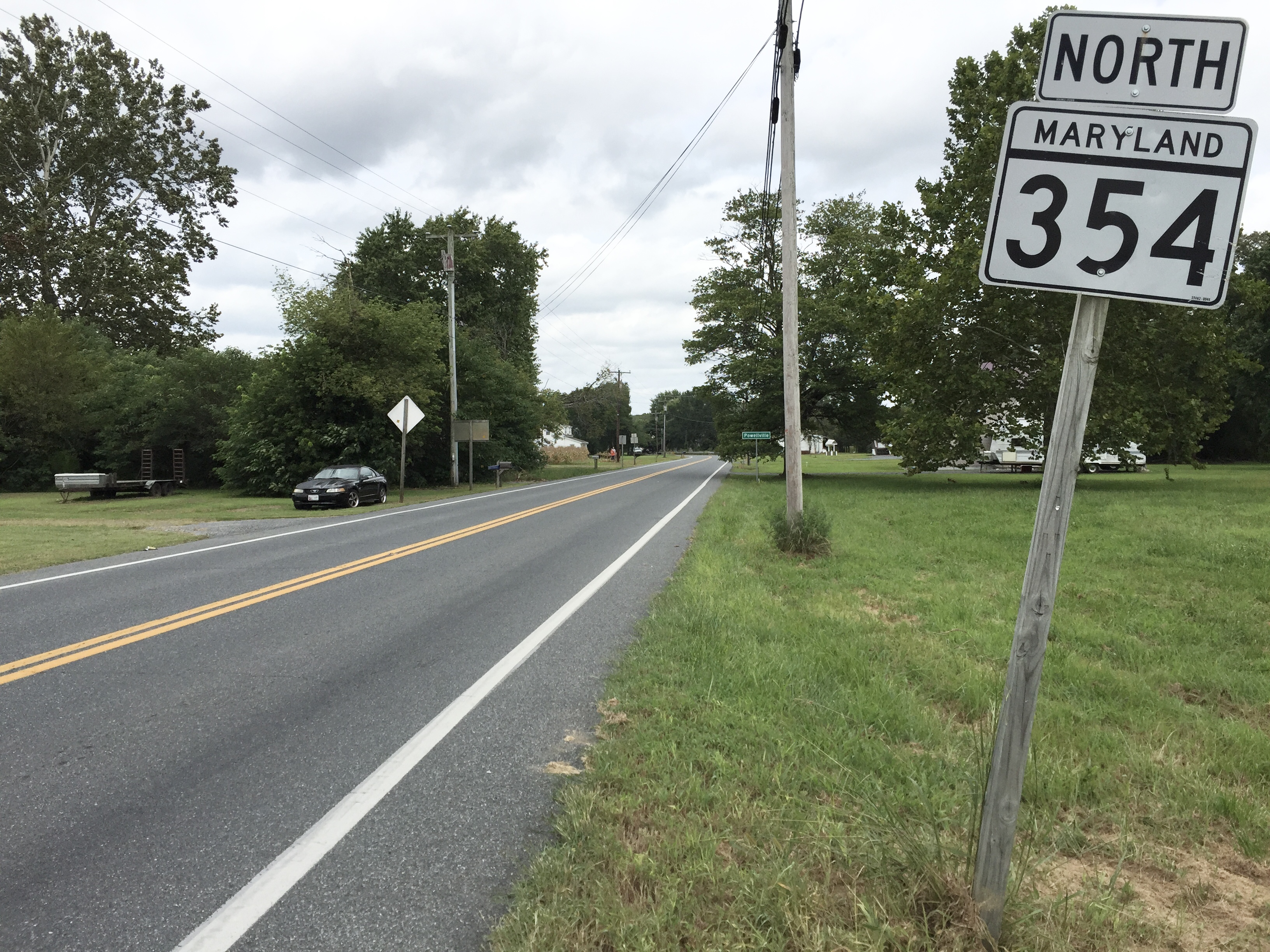
View north along MD 354 at MD 374 in Powellville

MD 354 begins at an intersection with MD 12 in the hamlet of Indiantown north of the town of Snow Hill. Nassawango Road heads southwest from the junction toward Pocomoke State Forest. MD 354 heads north as Whiton Road, a two-lane undivided road that passes through farmland and parallels the Pocomoke River at a distance. The state highway crosses Tilghman Race before passing through the hamlet of Whiton and entering Wicomico County, where the name of the highway changes to Powellville Road. In Powellville, MD 354 intersects the western terminus of MD 374 (Burbage Crossing Road) at an acute angle and the eastern terminus of MD 350 (Mount Hermon Road) at a right angle before crossing Adkins Mill Pond. After passing through more farmland, the state highway enters the town of Willards and intersects U.S. Route 50 (US 50, Ocean Gateway). MD 354 continues north to its terminus at MD 346 (Old Ocean City Road), where Main Street continues north into the center of Willards.

== History ==
The first section of the highway that was to become MD 354 was paved from the Pennsylvania Railroad crossing on the north side of Willards south to Friendship Road north of Powellville in 1917. The pavement was extended south to Powellville by 1921. Paving began from Indiantown toward Whiton by 1927. MD 354 was completed south to Whiton in 1930. The gap south of Whiton was filled in 1933, completing the highway. The state highway between Powellville and Willards was widened in 1956, the same year the northern end was rolled back from the railroad crossing in Willards to US 50 (now MD 346).

== Junction list ==
County	Location	mi	km	Destinations	Notes
Worcester	Indiantown	0.00	0.00	MD 12 (Snow Hill Road) / Nassawango Road south – Snow Hill, Salisbury	Southern terminus
Wicomico	Powellville	10.13	16.30	MD 374 east (Burbage Crossing Road) – Berlin	Western terminus of MD 374
Wicomico	Powellville	10.49	16.88	MD 350 west (Mount Hermon Road) – Salisbury	Eastern terminus of MD 350
Wicomico	Willards	14.79	23.80	US 50 (Ocean Gateway) – Salisbury, Ocean City	
Wicomico	Willards	14.98	24.11	MD 346 (Old Ocean City Road) / Main Street north – Pittsville, Whaleyville	Northern terminus
1.000 mi = 1.609 km; 1.000 km = 0.621 mi
