= Maryland Route 350 =

State highway in Maryland, United States

Maryland Route 350
- Mount Hermon Road
- Maryland Route 350 highlighted in red

Route information
- Maintained by MDSHA and City of Salisbury
- Length: 11.80 mi (18.99 km)
- Existed: 1927–present

Major junctions
- West end: Main Street in Salisbury
- East end: MD 354 in Powellville

Location
- Country: United States
- State: Maryland
- Counties: Wicomico

Highway system
- Maryland highway system; Interstate; US; State; Scenic Byways
← MD 349	→ MD 352

Maryland Route 350 (MD 350) is a state highway in the U.S. state of Maryland. Known as Mount Hermon Road, the state highway runs 11.80 miles (18.99 km) from Main Street in Salisbury east to MD 354 in Powellville. MD 350 provides access to a large area of farmland and forest in southeastern Wicomico County as well as Salisbury–Ocean City–Wicomico Regional Airport. The state highway was constructed from Salisbury to Mount Hermon in the 1910s and from Mount Hermon to Powellville in the first half of the 1930s.

== Route description ==
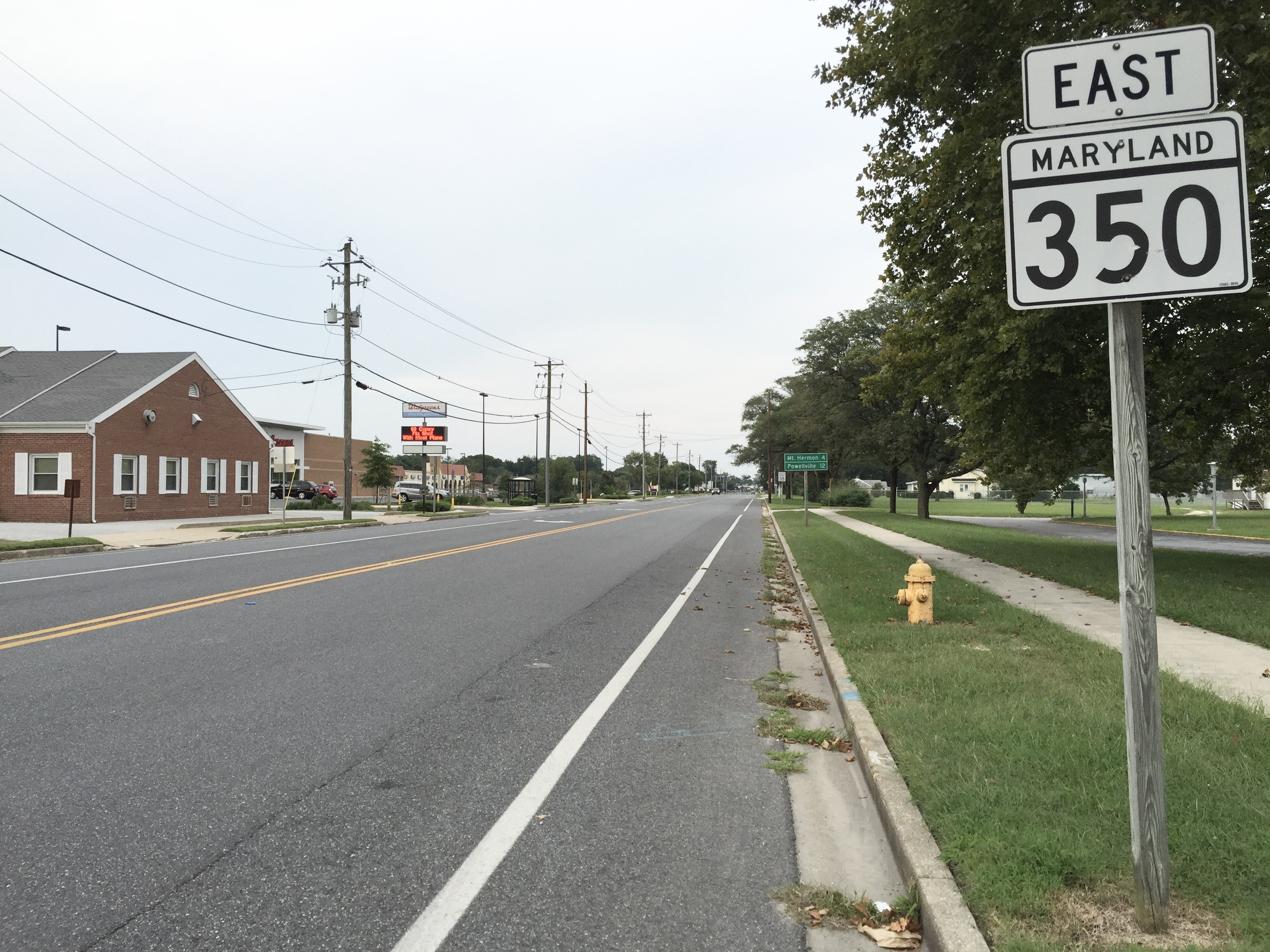
View east along MD 350 at Main Street in Salisbury

MD 350 begins as the east leg of a six-way intersection in the city of Salisbury. Main Street, which was formerly U.S. Route 50 (US 50), runs through the intersection from southwest to northeast, while Long Avenue, Truitt Street, and William Street are the south, north, and west prongs of the junction, respectively. MD 350, which is maintained by the city of Salisbury for its first 0.18 miles (0.29 km), heads east as a four-lane undivided highway, passing north of Wicomico High School. The state highway parallels the partially controlled access US 50 Business (Salisbury Parkway) on the south and provides access to businesses situated between the two highways. After the intersection with Beaglin Park Drive, a county arterial highway on the east side of Salisbury, MD 350 veers away from US 50 Business and reduces to a two-lane road. The state highway passes under US 13 (Salisbury Bypass) with no access and crosses Beaverdam Creek. MD 350 continues through the hamlet of Mount Hermon, where the highway intersects Hobbs Road and Airport Road, the latter of which leads south to Salisbury–Ocean City–Wicomico Regional Airport. The state highway passes through a mix of farmland and forest, traversing Horsebridge Creek, Gate Creek, and Nassawango Creek in succession on the edge of the Wicomico Demonstration Forest, which is accessed via Sixty Foot Road. MD 350 enters Powellville and reaches its eastern terminus at MD 354 (Powellville Road).

== History ==
The first portion of MD 350 was constructed between Salisbury and Mount Hermon as a state-aid road by 1915; this highway was improved and brought into the state highway system by 1919. Work began on the Mount Hermon–Powellville portion of the highway in 1929. A small segment in Powellville and the section between Mount Hermon and Sixty Foot Road were completed by 1933. The gap between Sixty Foot Road and the west end of Powellville was closed in 1935.

== Junction list ==
The entire route is in Wicomico County.

Location	mi	km	Destinations	Notes
Salisbury	0.00	0.00	Main Street to US 50 Bus. / Long Avenue south / William Street west / Truitt Street north	Western terminus
Mount Hermon	3.34	5.38	Airport Road south – Salisbury–Ocean City–Wicomico Regional Airport	
Powellville	11.80	18.99	MD 354 (Powellville Road) to US 50 / MD 12 – Willards, Snow Hill	Eastern terminus
1.000 mi = 1.609 km; 1.000 km = 0.621 mi
