= Maryland Route 353 =

Highway in Maryland

Maryland Route 353
- Maryland Route 353 highlighted in red

Route information
- Maintained by MDSHA
- Length: 5.08 mi (8.18 km)
- Existed: 1927–present

Major junctions
- South end: US 50 in Pittsville
- MD 346 in Pittsville
- North end: DE 26 / Route 54 near Pittsville

Location
- Country: United States
- State: Maryland
- Counties: Wicomico

Highway system
- Maryland highway system; Interstate; US; State; Scenic Byways
← MD 352	→ MD 354

Maryland Route 353 (MD 353) is a state highway in the U.S. state of Maryland. Known for most of its length as Gumboro Road, the state highway runs 5.08 miles (8.18 km) from U.S. Route 50 (US 50) just south of Pittsville north to the Delaware state line, where the highway intersects Delaware Route 26 (DE 26) and DE-MD 54. MD 353 was constructed in the mid- to late 1920s. The route was extended south from MD 346 to US 50 in Pittsville in 2016.

== Route description ==
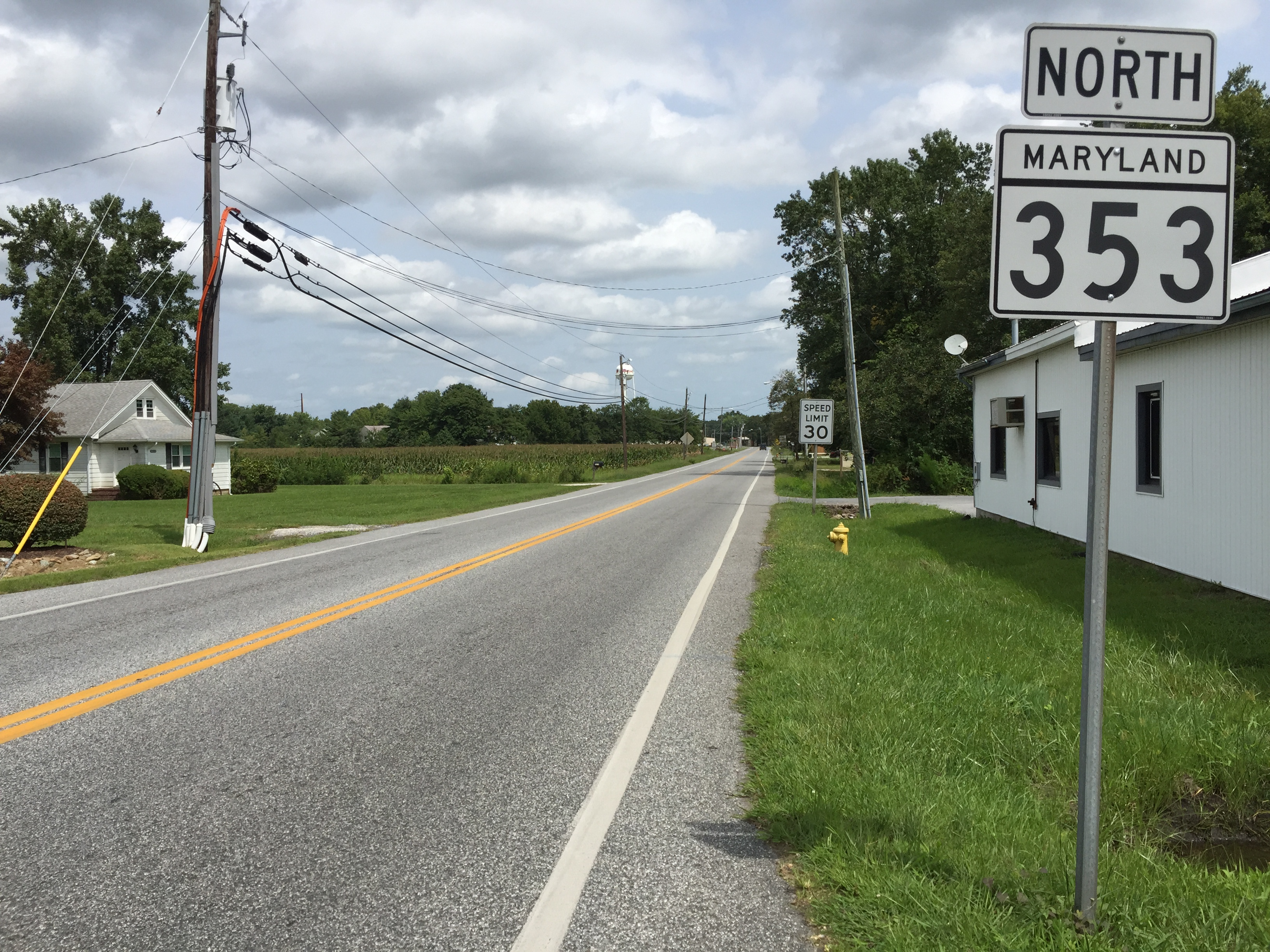
View north along MD 353 at MD 346 in Pittsville

MD 353 begins at an intersection with US 50 (Ocean Gateway) just south of Pittsville, heading northeast on two-lane undivided Sixty Foot Road, which continues south as a county highway past US 50. Upon crossing MD 346 (Old Ocean City Road), the road name changes to Gumboro Road and MD 353 heads through the town of Pittsville. After intersecting Main Street, the highway turns north past scattered residences. After crossing Aydelotte Branch, MD 353 leaves Pittsville, crossing Burnt Mill Branch and passing through farmland all the way to the highway's northern terminus at the Delaware state line. The roadway continues into Delaware as DE 26 and DE 54 (Millsboro Highway). East Line Road heads east from the intersection at the state line, while DE-MD 54 (East Line Road) follows the state line west to the towns of Delmar, Maryland, and Delmar, Delaware.

== History ==
MD 353 was constructed as a modern highway beginning in 1925 from Pittsville. By 1927, the highway extended north to Burnt Mill Branch. MD 353 was completed to the Delaware state line in 1929. On April 20, 2016, the portion of Sixty Foot Road between US 50 and MD 346 was transferred from county and town maintenance to state maintenance and became a southern extension of MD 353.

== Junction list ==
The entire route is in Wicomico County.

Location	mi	km	Destinations	Notes
Pittsville	0.00	0.00	US 50 (Ocean Gateway) / Sixty Foot Road south – Ocean City, Salisbury	Southern terminus
Pittsville	0.48	0.77	MD 346 (Old Ocean City Road) – Parsonsburg, Willards	
	5.08	8.18	Route 54 west (East Line Road) / East Line Road east – Delmar DE 26 east / DE 54 east (Millsboro Highway) – Gumboro	Delaware state line; northern terminus; eastern terminus of MD 54
1.000 mi = 1.609 km; 1.000 km = 0.621 mi
