= Maryland Route 374 =

State highway in Maryland, United States

Maryland Route 374
- Maryland Route 374 highlighted in red

Route information
- Maintained by MDSHA
- Length: 9.98 mi (16.06 km)
- Existed: 1927–present

Major junctions
- West end: MD 354 in Powellville
- East end: MD 818 in Berlin

Location
- Country: United States
- State: Maryland
- Counties: Wicomico, Worcester

Highway system
- Maryland highway system; Interstate; US; State; Scenic Byways
← MD 373	→ MD 375

Maryland Route 374 (MD 374) is a state highway in the U.S. state of Maryland. Known for much of its length as Libertytown Road, the state highway runs 9.98 miles (16.06 km) from MD 354 in Powellville east to MD 818 in Berlin. MD 374 was constructed between Berlin and Libertytown around 1930. The portion between Powellville and Libertytown was completed in the mid-1950s.

== Route description ==
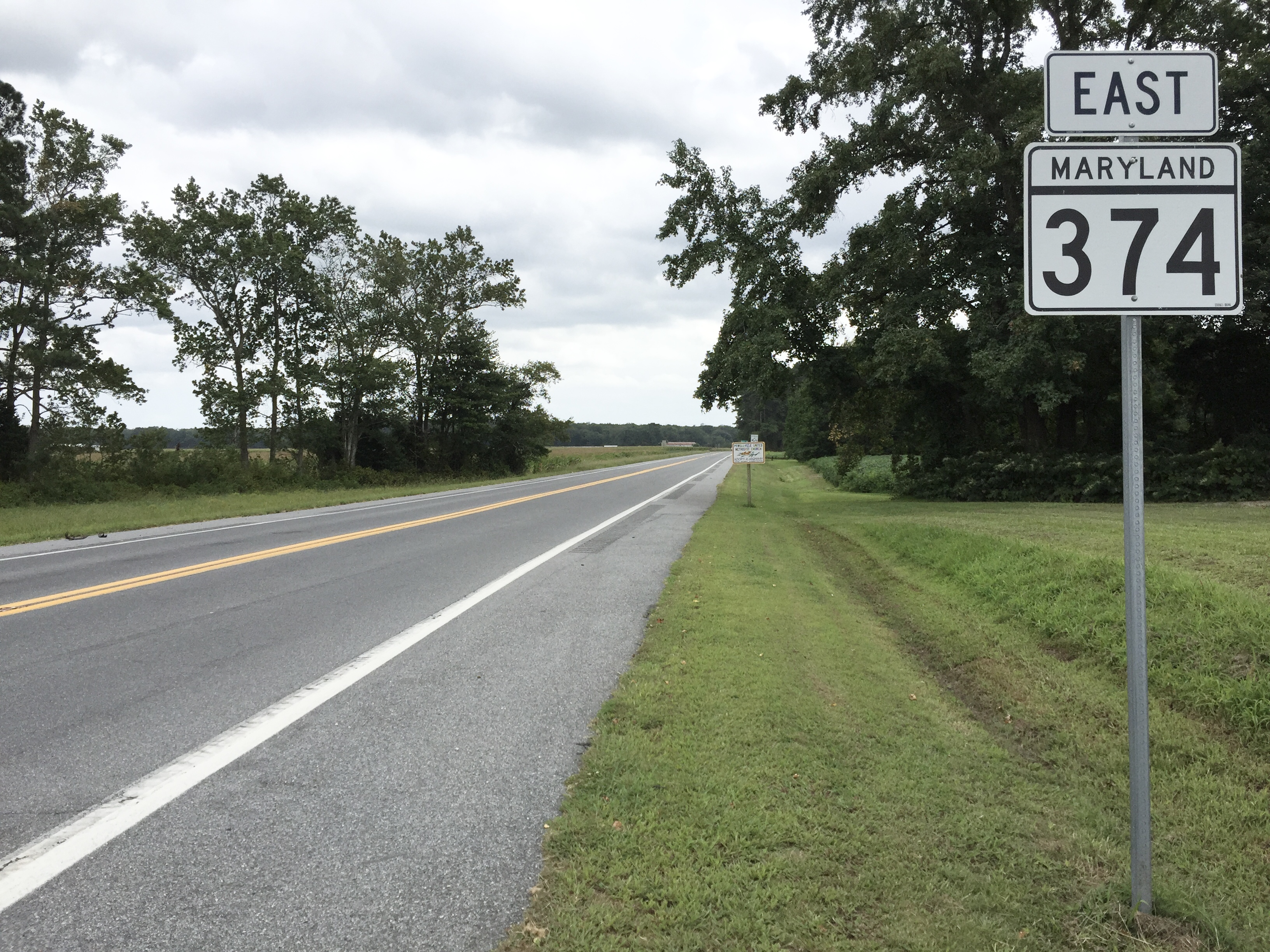
View east along MD 374 at MD 354 in Powellville

MD 374 begins at an acute intersection with MD 354 (Powellville Road) in Powellville. The state highway heads southeast as two-lane undivided Burbage Crossing Road. MD 374 crosses the Pocomoke River and enters Worcester County, where the highway's name changes to Libertytown Road. The state highway curves northeast and passes through Libertytown, where the highway intersects Purnell Crossing Road and Ironshire Station Road, then crosses Libertytown Branch. After passing Bay Club Golf Course, MD 374 enters Berlin, where the name of the highway changes to Broad Street. The state highway crosses the Snow Hill Line of the Maryland and Delaware Railroad and enters the Berlin Commercial District. MD 374 passes the western end of unsigned MD 375 (Commerce Street), which runs one-way westbound, before reaching its eastern terminus at an acute intersection with MD 818 (Main Street).

== History ==
The first part of MD 374 to be paved was Broad Street in Berlin in 1925. The pavement was extended west to around Narrow Branch Road in 1929 and 1930 and to Libertytown by 1933. A short segment was constructed west of Libertytown in 1937. The section between Powellville and the western end of the existing section of MD 374 near Libertytown was constructed on mostly new alignment between 1952 and 1956.

== Junction list ==
County	Location	mi	km	Destinations	Notes
Wicomico	Powellville	0.00	0.00	MD 354 (Powellville Road) – Willards, Snow Hill	Western terminus
Worcester	Berlin	9.98	16.06	MD 818 (Main Street) – Snow Hill, Selbyville, DE	Eastern terminus
1.000 mi = 1.609 km; 1.000 km = 0.621 mi
