= Salisbury Airport =

Salisbury Airport can refer to:

- Harare International Airport
- Salisbury-Ocean City Wicomico Regional Airport
