= U.S. Route 13 Business (Salisbury, Maryland) =

Business route in Maryland, United States

U.S. Route 13 Business

Route information
- Auxiliary route of US 13
- Maintained by MDSHA
- Length: 8.14 mi (13.10 km)
- Existed: 1983–present

Major junctions
- South end: US 13 in Fruitland
- MD 513 in Fruitland; US 50 Bus. in Salisbury
- North end: US 13 / US 50 in Salisbury

Location
- Country: United States
- State: Maryland
- Counties: Wicomico

Highway system
- United States Numbered Highway System; List; Special; Divided; Maryland highway system; Interstate; US; State; Scenic Byways

U.S. Route 13 Business (US 13 Bus.) is a business route of US 13 in the U.S. state of Maryland. The highway runs 8.14 miles (13.10 km) between US 13 south of Fruitland and US 13 and US 50 on the north side of Salisbury. US 13 Bus. is a four-lane highway with divided and undivided sections that provides access to Salisbury University, downtown Salisbury, where the highway intersects US 50 Bus., and Fruitland, where the highway meets Maryland Route 513 (MD 513). US 13 Bus. was constructed as a new alignment of US 13 in several steps in the 1930s and early 1940s. The section of the highway through Salisbury was originally constructed with four lanes, while the portion of the highway through Fruitland and at the northern end was expanded to a divided highway in the first half of the 1950s. US 13 Bus. was designated when US 13 was moved to the Salisbury Bypass upon its completion in 1981.

== Route description ==
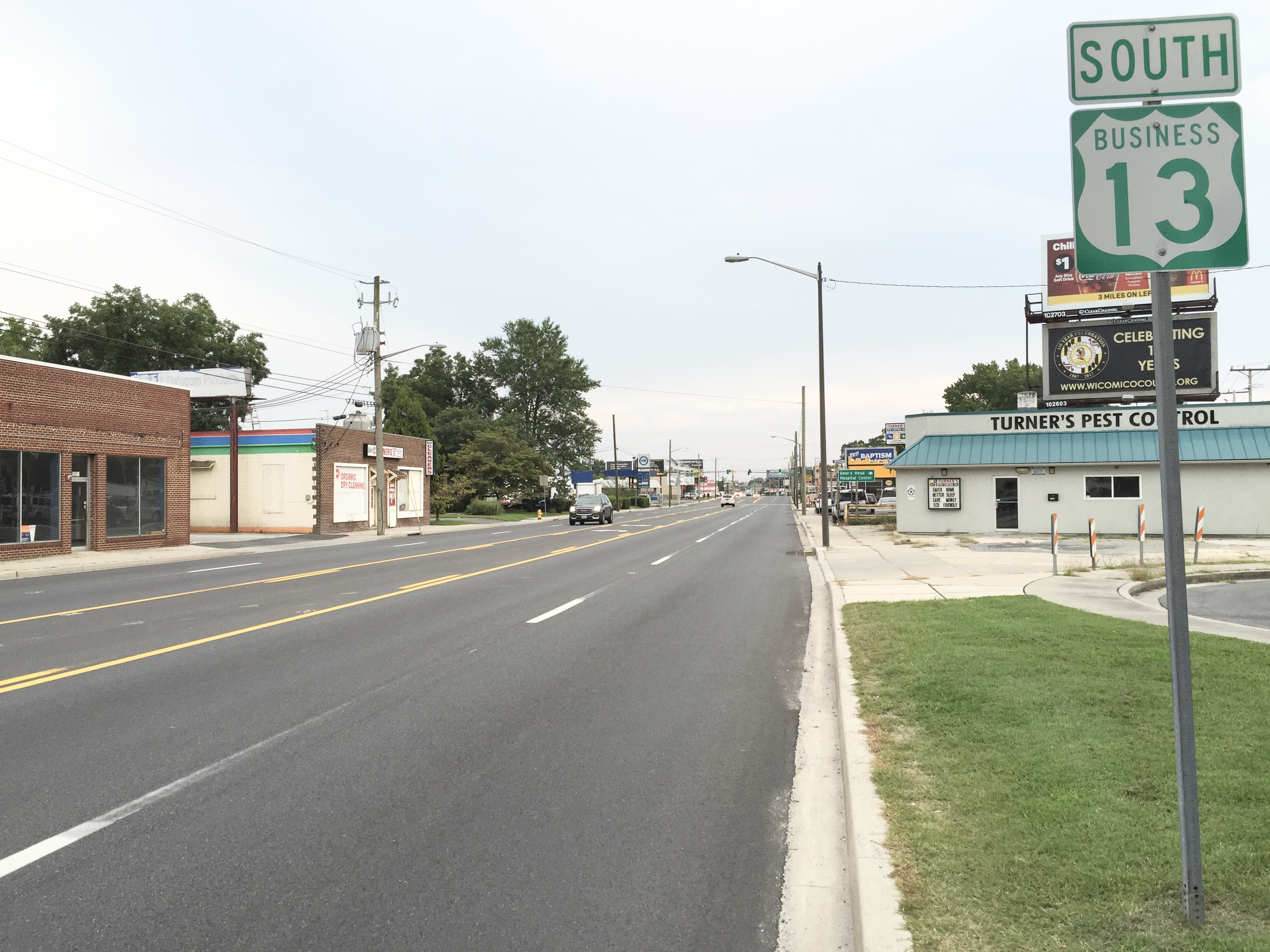
View south along US 13 Bus. at Livingston Street in Salisbury

US 13 Bus. begins at a partial interchange with US 13, which continues south as Ocean Highway and heads north as the Salisbury Bypass. There is no access from southbound US 13 Bus. to northbound US 13 or from southbound US 13 to northbound US 13 Bus. US 13 Bus. heads north as Fruitland Boulevard, a four-lane divided highway that parallels the Delmarva Central Railroad's Delmarva Subdivision track on the west past farms and scattered residences. Upon entering the city of Fruitland, the business route intersects Camden Avenue, which is an old alignment of US 13. After crossing Division Street, US 13 Bus. enters an industrial area and crosses Main Street. The highway continues north and intersects MD 513 (Cedar Lane) in a commercial area before leaving Fruitland by traversing Tonytank Pond.

US 13 Bus.'s name changes to Salisbury Boulevard and leaves the immediate vicinity of the railroad track as the highway passes through the campus of Salisbury University. At the northern edge of the campus, the business route meets College Avenue and reduces to a five-lane undivided highway with center turn lane. After passing through a commercial strip, US 13 Bus. performs an S-curve to the east and crosses Division Street right after the highway again begins to closely parallel the Delmarva Subdivision railroad track. The business route crosses the South Prong of the Wicomico River and intersects Main Street, the old alignment of US 50. US 13 Bus. passes West Church Street and the combined intersection of Broad Street and East Church Street on either side of the overpass of US 50 Bus. East Church Street, which is one-way eastbound, connects traffic from eastbound US 50 Bus. to US 13 Bus., while Broad Street, which is one-way westbound, is used to access westbound US 50 Bus. from US 13 Bus.

US 13 Bus. intersects Isabella Street and passes historic Union Station before crossing the Delmarva Central Railroad's Mardela Industrial Track line. The business route intersects Naylor Street, which provides access to US 13's original alignment, Division Street, before the highway temporarily expands to a divided highway to cross over the Delmarva Subdivision line on a bridge. US 13 Business crosses Peggy Branch and passes through a commercial area, heading northwest of the WBOC-TV studios, before expanding to a divided highway again immediately before its northern terminus at the Salisbury Bypass adjacent to The Centre at Salisbury shopping mall. US 50 follows both directions of the Salisbury Bypass, while US 13 heads south on the bypass and north on Salisbury Boulevard. There is no access between northbound US 13 Bus. and westbound US 50.

US 13 Bus. is a part of the National Highway System as a principal arterial for its entire length.

== History ==
The original north–south highway through Fruitland and Salisbury followed Allen Road north from Allen on Wicomico County's border with Somerset County to near the present intersection of Division Street and Camden Avenue on the west side of Fruitland. Division Street continued east to pass through the center of Fruitland before heading north to Salisbury, while Camden Avenue bypassed Fruitland to the west and headed directly toward Salisbury. The two roads reunited in downtown Salisbury just south of Main Street. Division Street continued north out of Salisbury toward Delmar. When the Maryland State Roads Commission (SRC) designated a state road system in 1909, the highway between Allen and Salisbury using Camden Avenue was designated a state road. The state road was completed from the southern limit of Salisbury to Main Street in Fruitland in 1912 and from there to Allen in 1913. The highway between Salisbury and Delmar was completed by 1921. US 13 was assigned to these state roads from Allen to Delmar in 1927.

The first upgrade to US 13 in the Salisbury–Fruitland area occurred in 1930 when Division Street north of downtown Salisbury was placed on an overpass over the New York, Philadelphia and Norfolk Railroad. In addition, an eight-mile (13 km) section of straight highway mostly paralleling the railroad tracks between Princess Anne and Camden Avenue west of Fruitland opened in 1933. The bypassed highway, which crossed the railroad tracks twice, was designated MD 529. The first portion of the first Salisbury Bypass, now named Salisbury Boulevard, was completed in 1938 between College Avenue and Main Street in Salisbury. The second segment, between the present intersection of US 13 Bus. and Camden Avenue south of Fruitland and College Avenue, was completed in 1939. Upon completion of the first two sections, US 13 was moved to the bypass and Camden Avenue was designated MD 663. The third and final section, from Main Street to Zion Road on the north side of Salisbury, was completed by 1942. After US 13 moved to the new highway, Division Street north of Main Street was designated MD 475. In 1951, a second bridge over the railroad was completed in north Salisbury and US 13 north of Zion Road was relocated and expanded to a divided highway. US 13 from the Somerset County line to College Avenue in Salisbury was also dualized between 1954 and 1956.

The next major upgrade to US 13 was the construction of the Salisbury Bypass beginning from the northern end around 1973. The Salisbury Bypass was completed south to MD 12, including the interchange with US 50, in 1975. The US 13 portion of the bypass was completed in 1981; US 13 Bus. was assigned to the bypassed highway through Fruitland and Salisbury by 1983. The interchange at the northern end of US 13's part of the Salisbury Bypass had several ramps added during the extension of the bypass west to US 50 between 2000 and 2002.

== Major intersections ==
The entire route is in Wicomico County.

Location	mi	km	Destinations	Notes
	0.00	0.00	US 13 south	Interchange; access to southbound US 13 and from northbound US 13; southern terminius
Fruitland	2.64	4.25	MD 513 east (St. Lukes Road / Cedar Lane)	Western terminus of MD 513
Salisbury	5.47	8.80	Main Street to US 50 east – Ocean City, Snow Hill, Airport	Old alignment of US 50
Salisbury	5.64	9.08	US 50 Bus. west / Broad Street / East Church Street – Business District, Cambridge, Bay Bridge	Interchange
Salisbury	8.14	13.10	US 13 / US 50 east – Ocean City, Norfolk	Interchange; no access from US 13 Bus. north to US 50 west; northern terminus
1.000 mi = 1.609 km; 1.000 km = 0.621 mi
