= Maryland Route 610 =

State highway in Maryland, United States

Maryland Route 610
- Maryland Route 610 highlighted in red

Route information
- Maintained by MDSHA
- Length: 6.53 mi (10.51 km)
- Existed: 1935–present

Major junctions
- West end: Dale Road near Whaleyville
- US 50 in Whaleyville; MD 346 in Whaleyville
- East end: US 113 in Bishop

Location
- Country: United States
- State: Maryland
- Counties: Worcester

Highway system
- Maryland highway system; Interstate; US; State; Scenic Byways
← MD 607	→ MD 611

Maryland Route 610 (MD 610) is a state highway in the U.S. state of Maryland. Known for most of its length as Whaleyville Road, the state highway runs 6.53 miles (10.51 km) from the county-maintained portion of Dale Road near Whaleyville north to U.S. Route 113 (US 113) near Bishop. The first segment of MD 610 was constructed near Whaleyville in the mid-1930s. The highway to Bishop was brought into the state highway system in the 1940s. MD 610, which did not originally reach US 50, was extended south to that highway, now MD 346, in 1955. The state highway reached its current southern terminus after the US 50 divided highway was constructed in the mid-1960s.

== Route description ==
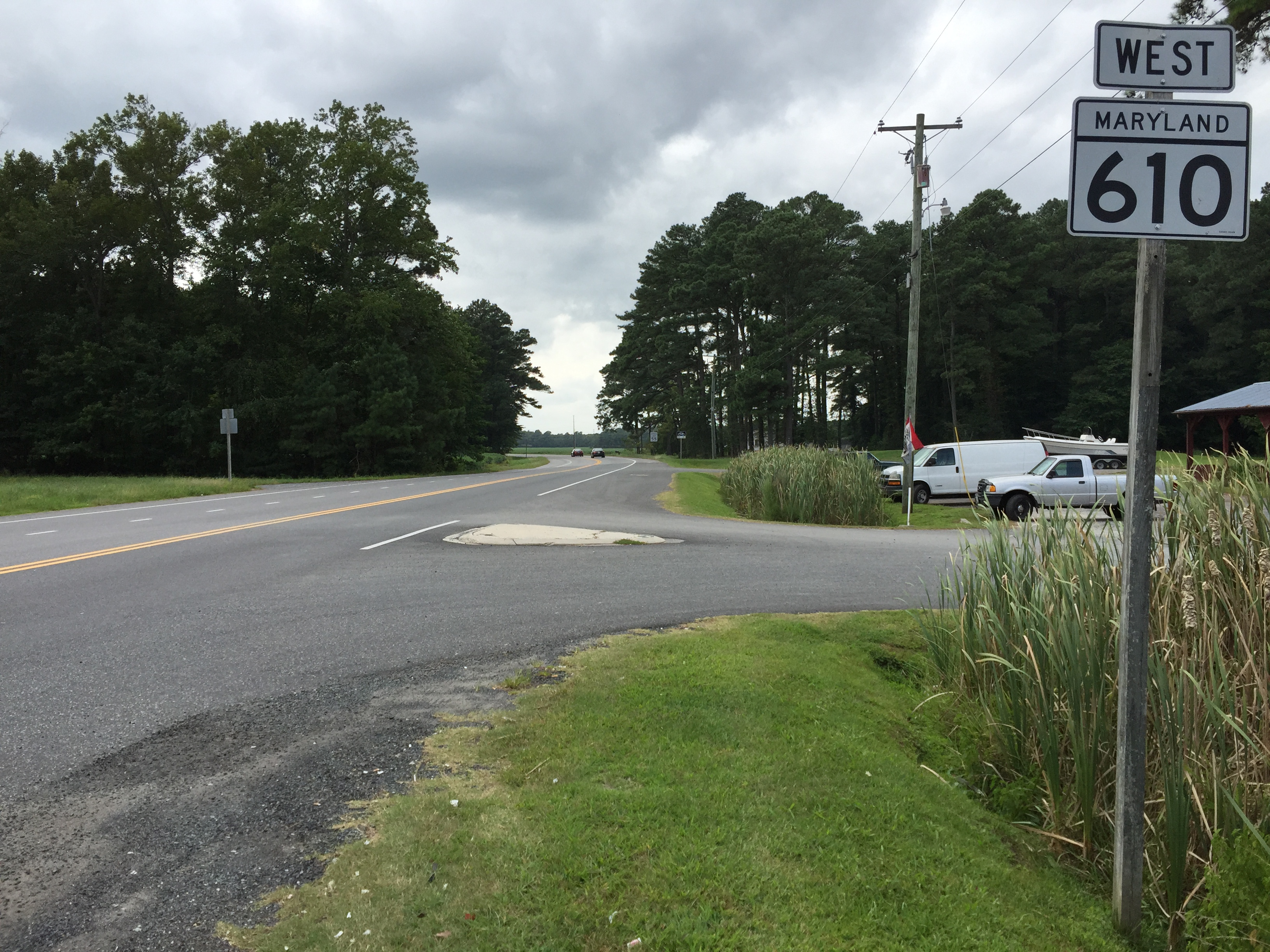
View west along MD 610 at US 113 in Bishop

MD 610 begins at a point on Dale Road 0.20 miles (0.32 km) south of US 50 (Ocean Gateway) near Whaleyville. The state highway heads north from the intersection with US 50 as two-lane undivided Whaleyville Road. After crossing MD 346 (Old Ocean City Boulevard), MD 610 bypasses the center of Whaleyville on the west and intersects Sheppards Crossing Road. The state highway curves to the northeast and crosses Shavox Church Road and Peerless Road as well as Birch Branch on the way to its eastern terminus at US 113 (Worcester Highway) in Bishop. Hammond Road, which for a short stretch is unsigned MD 575L, continues east on the other side of the intersection toward Bishopville.

== History ==
The first segment of MD 610 was constructed from Sheppards Crossing Road to Donaway Road north of Whaleyville in 1935. It was connected to US 213 (later US 50 and now MD 346) by Sheppards Crossing Road, which was improved by the Maryland State Roads Commission by 1934. By 1946, state maintenance was extended east to Campbelltown Road near Bishop. The segment between Campbelltown Road and US 113 was brought under state maintenance in 1950. In 1955, MD 610 was extended south along a new alignment from Sheppards Crossing Road to present day MD 346. The state highway was extended south again in 1966 to both connect with the new US 50 divided highway and to access properties on Dale Road, whose original alignment had been interrupted by the relocation of US 50.

== Junction list ==
The entire route is in Worcester County.

Location	mi	km	Destinations	Notes
Whaleyville	0.00	0.00	Dale Road south	Western terminus
Whaleyville	0.20	0.32	US 50 (Ocean Gateway) – Ocean City, Salisbury	
Whaleyville	0.73	1.17	MD 346 (Old Ocean City Boulevard) – St. Martin	
Bishop	6.53	10.51	US 113 (Worcester Highway) / Hammond Road – Selbyville	Eastern terminus; Hammond Road is unsigned MD 575L
1.000 mi = 1.609 km; 1.000 km = 0.621 mi
