= Wicomico County, Maryland =

County in Maryland, United States

- County
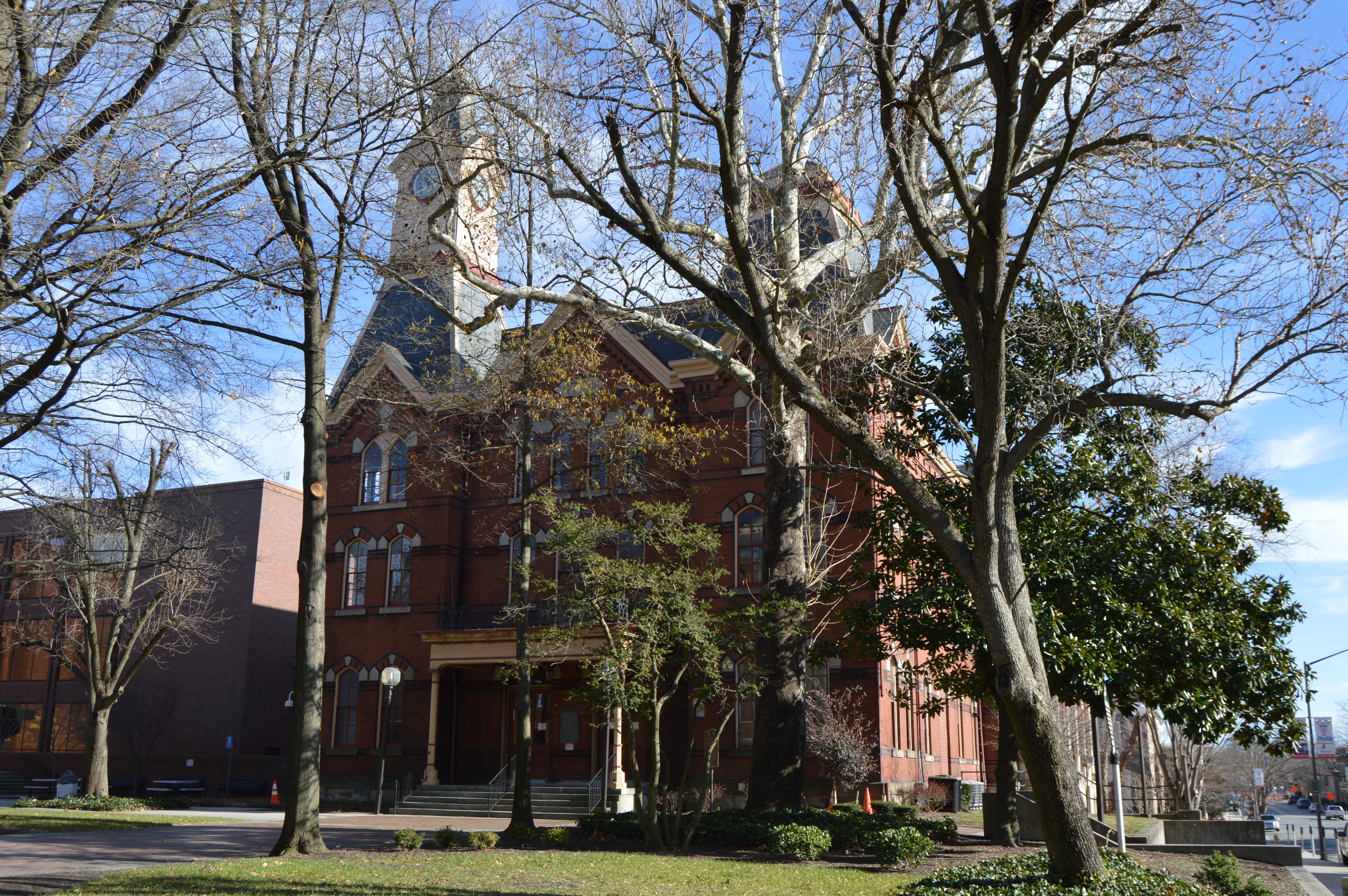
- Wicomico County Courthouse in Salisbury

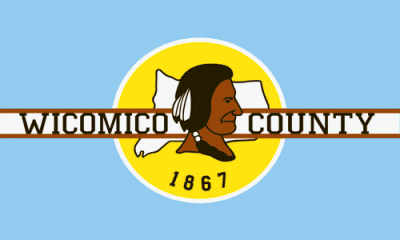
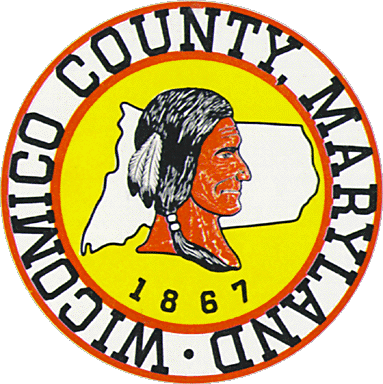
- Flag Seal

- Location within the U.S. state of Maryland
- Coordinates: 38°22′N 75°38′W
- Country: United States
- State: Maryland
- Founded: 1867
- Named for: Wicomico River
- Seat: Salisbury
- Largest city: Salisbury

Area
  - Total: 400 sq mi (1,000 km^{2})
  - Land: 374 sq mi (970 km^{2})
  - Water: 26 sq mi (67 km^{2}) 6.4%

Population (2020)
  - Total: 103,588
  - Estimate (2025): 106,899 ▲
  - Density: 277/sq mi (107/km^{2})
- Time zone: UTC−5 (Eastern)
  - Summer (DST): UTC−4 (EDT)
- Congressional district: 1st
- Website: www.wicomicocounty.org

Wicomico County (/waɪˈkɒmɪkoʊ/ wy-KOM-ik-oh) is in the southeastern part of the U.S. state of Maryland, on the Delmarva Peninsula. As of the 2020 census, the population was 103,588. The county seat is Salisbury. The county was named for the Wicomico River, which in turn derives its name from the Algonquian language words wicko mekee, meaning "a place where houses are built", apparently referring to a Native American town on the banks. The county is included in the Salisbury, MD-DE Metropolitan Statistical Area, and is part of the Lower Eastern Shore region of the state.

== History ==
Wicomico County was created from Somerset and Worcester counties in 1867.

== Politics and government ==
Wicomico County was granted a charter form of government in 1964.

In the period after the Reconstruction era, Wicomico County became solidly Democratic because of its strong support for secession and state efforts to disfranchise most blacks by raising barriers to voter registration. Independent insurgent white groups worked to intimidate and discourage black voters, especially in rural areas.

No Republican carried Wicomico County until 1928, when Herbert Hoover won because of anti-Catholic sentiment in the heavily Protestant county against Democratic candidate Al Smith. The popular general Dwight D. Eisenhower carried Wicomico in 1952. Eisenhower again carried Wicomico in 1956; and Republican Richard Nixon won it in 1960, against John F. Kennedy who, like Al Smith, was Catholic.

No Democratic presidential nominee has won Wicomico County since Lyndon Johnson’s landslide in 1964, as white conservatives increasingly moved into the Republican Party. Bill Clinton, a son of the South, came within 384 votes of beating Bob Dole in 1996. The county trended Republican in 2000 and 2004, but Barack Obama obtained a higher proportion of the county vote in 2008 and 2012, likely benefiting from support from young, educated, or minority voters. In 2020, Joe Biden came extremely close to winning the county, with Donald Trump only edging him out by 890 votes. Biden obtained 47.7% of the county's vote, the highest percentage for any Democrat since 1964. Trump also won less than 50% of the vote, the first time a Republican had been held below a majority of the vote in Wicomico County since 1996.

Voter registration and party enrollment as of March 2024
Democratic	26,203	39.58%
Republican	23,950	36.18%
Unaffiliated	14,769	22.31%
Libertarian	361	0.55%
Other parties	913	1.38%
Total	66,196	100%

United States presidential election results for Wicomico County, Maryland
Year	Republican		Democratic		Third party(ies)	
Year	No.	%	No.	%	No.	%
1868	421	22.33%	1,464	77.67%	0	0.00%
1872	1,081	42.38%	1,470	57.62%	0	0.00%
1876	1,080	34.25%	2,073	65.75%	0	0.00%
1880	1,348	39.10%	2,058	59.69%	42	1.22%
1884	1,354	36.78%	2,262	61.45%	65	1.77%
1888	1,441	37.07%	2,210	56.86%	236	6.07%
1892	1,427	35.44%	2,317	57.55%	282	7.00%
1896	2,022	43.75%	2,253	48.75%	347	7.51%
1900	2,376	44.21%	2,793	51.97%	205	3.81%
1904	2,179	44.47%	2,593	52.92%	128	2.61%
1908	2,273	43.86%	2,751	53.09%	158	3.05%
1912	2,038	35.31%	3,176	55.02%	558	9.67%
1916	2,539	42.87%	3,285	55.47%	98	1.65%
1920	4,225	45.39%	5,054	54.29%	30	0.32%
1924	2,604	43.82%	3,068	51.62%	271	4.56%
1928	5,923	59.04%	4,095	40.82%	15	0.15%
1932	3,812	35.44%	6,895	64.11%	48	0.45%
1936	4,545	38.15%	7,273	61.05%	95	0.80%
1940	4,741	39.47%	7,198	59.92%	73	0.61%
1944	5,040	47.04%	5,674	52.96%	0	0.00%
1948	5,062	48.14%	5,415	51.49%	39	0.37%
1952	9,061	60.55%	5,878	39.28%	26	0.17%
1956	9,377	63.94%	5,289	36.06%	0	0.00%
1960	8,671	54.12%	7,350	45.88%	0	0.00%
1964	7,448	46.14%	8,695	53.86%	0	0.00%
1968	8,707	47.18%	5,392	29.22%	4,356	23.60%
1972	13,115	69.71%	5,510	29.29%	190	1.01%
1976	10,537	52.82%	9,412	47.18%	0	0.00%
1980	11,229	51.26%	9,431	43.05%	1,245	5.68%
1984	16,124	66.27%	8,160	33.54%	48	0.20%
1988	16,272	63.18%	9,413	36.55%	70	0.27%
1992	13,560	44.79%	11,481	37.93%	5,231	17.28%
1996	12,687	46.50%	12,303	45.09%	2,296	8.41%
2000	16,338	51.39%	14,469	45.51%	988	3.11%
2004	21,998	58.66%	15,137	40.36%	368	0.98%
2008	21,849	52.20%	19,436	46.44%	569	1.36%
2012	21,764	51.50%	19,635	46.46%	860	2.04%
2016	22,198	52.17%	18,050	42.42%	2,299	5.40%
2020	22,944	49.65%	22,054	47.72%	1,218	2.64%
2024	24,065	51.30%	21,513	45.86%	1,334	2.84%

Wicomico County's government, since 2006, uses a council-elected executive system where the voters elect members of the County Council and Executive. Before 2006, the county operated under a council-administrator system where voters elected council members who in turn appointed an administrator to oversee the government.

=== County council ===
The legislative functions of government are vested in the County Council. The County Council consists of seven members, five of whom are elected from single-member districts; the other two are elected at-large.

Wicomico County Council
District	Name	Party	Role
District 1	Shanie P. Shields	Democratic	
District 2	Jeff Merritt	Republican	Vice President
District 3	Shane T. Baker	Republican	
District 4	Joshua Hastings	Democratic	
District 5	Joseph Holloway	Republican	
At-Large	John T. Cannon	Republican	President
At-Large	James Winn	Republican	

=== County executive ===
The county executive oversees the executive branch of the County government, which consists of a number of offices and departments. The executive branch is charged with implementing County law and overseeing the operation of County Government. The position of County Executive was established by a modification of the county's Charter in 2006. Day-to-day functions of the executive branch fall to the appointed Director of Administration, who also serves as the Acting County Executive during vacancies in the office of the County Executive. Upon the death of Robert L. "Bob" Culver Jr., on July 26, 2020, the Wicomico County Council appointed then-Director of Administration John D. Psota to that role in an acting capacity until the 2022 election cycle for the county executive seat.

In June 2024, the Wicomico County Council voted to approve a referendum for the 2024 elections on whether to restore Wicomico County to a council–manager government, thereby abolishing the county executive position. The measure, which was not approved by voters, would have gone into effect at the conclusion of Julie Giordano's current term in late 2026.

Wicomico County Executive
Name	Party	From	To
Richard M. Pollitt Jr.	Democratic	2006	2014
Robert L. Culver Jr.	Republican	2014	2020
John D. Psota (Acting)	Republican	2020	2022
Julie Giordano	Republican	2022	

=== Sheriff ===
Law enforcement in the county is provided by the Wicomico County Sheriff's Office. The sheriff, Mike Lewis, a Republican, is an elected official. Municipal police agencies exist in the towns of Delmar and Pittsville, along with the cities of Fruitland and Salisbury.

=== State's attorney ===
The Wicomico County State's Attorney is responsible for prosecuting the felony, misdemeanor, and juvenile cases occurring in the county. The current elected State's Attorney is Jamie Dykes.

== Geography ==
According to the U.S. Census Bureau, the county has a total area of 400 square miles (1,000 km^{2}), of which 374 square miles (970 km^{2}) is land and 26 square miles (67 km^{2}) (6.4%) is water.

The county's boundary with Delaware is composed of the Mason–Dixon line and the Transpeninsular Line. The intersection of these two historical lines is the midpoint of the Transpeninsular Line, fixed by Mason and Dixon between 1763 and 1767. The midpoint is about 8 miles (13 km) northwest of Salisbury, near the center of the Delmarva Peninsula. The county is generally flat, characteristic of the region, with a few small hills in the northeast. The lowest elevation is at sea level and the highest elevation is 98 ft (30 m).

=== Adjacent counties ===
- Dorchester County, Maryland (northwest)
- Somerset County, Maryland (southwest)
- Sussex County, Delaware (north)
- Worcester County, Maryland (southeast)

=== Major highways ===
- US 13
- US 13 Bus.
- US 50
- US 50 Bus.
- MD 12
- MD 54
- MD 313
- MD 346
- MD 347
- MD 348
- MD 349
- MD 350
- MD 352
- MD 353
- MD 354
- MD 374
- MD 513
- MD 670
- MD 675
- MD 815
- MD 992

=== Climate ===
The county has a humid subtropical climate (Cfa) according to the Köppen climate classification. According to the Trewartha climate classification, the subtropical boundary of eight months of daily averages of at least 50 °F (10 °C) runs through the northern part of Wicomico County. The hardiness zone is mainly 7b.

== Demographics ==
Historical population
Census	Pop.	Note	%±
1870	15,802		—
1880	18,016		14.0%
1890	19,930		10.6%
1900	22,852		14.7%
1910	26,815		17.3%
1920	28,165		5.0%
1930	31,229		10.9%
1940	34,530		10.6%
1950	39,641		14.8%
1960	49,050		23.7%
1970	54,236		10.6%
1980	64,540		19.0%
1990	74,339		15.2%
2000	84,644		13.9%
2010	98,733		16.6%
2020	103,588		4.9%
2025 (est.)	106,899	▲	3.2%
U.S. Decennial Census; 1790-1960 1900-1990; 1990-2000 2010–2018

=== Racial and ethnic composition ===
Wicomico County, Maryland – Racial and ethnic composition Note: the US Census treats Hispanic/Latino as an ethnic category. This table excludes Latinos from the racial categories and assigns them to a separate category. Hispanics/Latinos may be of any race.
Race / Ethnicity (NH = Non-Hispanic)	Pop 1980	Pop 1990	Pop 2000	Pop 2010	Pop 2020	% 1980	% 1990	% 2000	% 2010	% 2020
White alone (NH)	49,679	56,404	60,552	65,767	60,340	76.97%	75.87%	71.54%	66.61%	58.25%
Black or African American alone (NH)	13,985	16,493	19,583	23,534	27,586	21.67%	22.19%	23.14%	23.84%	26.63%
Native American or Alaska Native alone (NH)	67	129	161	198	212	0.10%	0.17%	0.19%	0.20%	0.20%
Asian alone (NH)	344	656	1,459	2,460	3,120	0.53%	0.88%	1.72%	2.49%	3.01%
Native Hawaiian or Pacific Islander alone (NH)	x	x	13	21	39	x	x	0.02%	0.02%	0.04%
Other race alone (NH)	57	47	89	209	443	0.09%	0.06%	0.11%	0.21%	0.43%
Mixed race or Multiracial (NH)	x	x	945	2,066	4,757	x	x	1.12%	2.09%	4.59%
Hispanic or Latino (any race)	408	610	1,842	4,478	7,091	0.63%	0.82%	2.18%	4.54%	6.85%
Total	64,540	74,339	84,644	98,733	103,588	100.00%	100.00%	100.00%	100.00%	100.00%

=== 2020 census ===
As of the 2020 census, the county had a population of 103,588. The median age was 37.9 years, 21.9% of residents were under the age of 18, and 17.3% of residents were 65 years of age or older. For every 100 females there were 91.7 males, and for every 100 females age 18 and over there were 88.6 males. 73.1% of residents lived in urban areas, while 26.9% lived in rural areas.

The racial makeup of the county was 59.3% White, 27.0% Black or African American, 0.4% American Indian and Alaska Native, 3.0% Asian, 0.0% Native Hawaiian and Pacific Islander, 3.6% from some other race, and 6.5% from two or more races. Hispanic or Latino residents of any race comprised 6.8% of the population.

There were 40,018 households in the county, of which 30.2% had children under the age of 18 living with them and 32.1% had a female householder with no spouse or partner present. About 27.5% of all households were made up of individuals and 12.0% had someone living alone who was 65 years of age or older.

There were 43,682 housing units, of which 8.4% were vacant. Among occupied housing units, 59.2% were owner-occupied and 40.8% were renter-occupied. The homeowner vacancy rate was 1.9% and the rental vacancy rate was 6.8%.

=== 2010 census ===
As of the 2010 United States census, there were 98,733 people, 37,220 households, and 24,172 families living in the county. The population density was 263.7 inhabitants per square mile (101.8/km^{2}). There were 41,192 housing units at an average density of 110.0 per square mile (42.5/km^{2}). The racial makeup of the county was 68.7% white, 24.2% black or African American, 2.5% Asian, 0.2% American Indian, 1.9% from other races, and 2.5% from two or more races. Those of Hispanic or Latino origin made up 4.5% of the population. In terms of ancestry, 15.7% were English, 15.1% were German, 13.6% were Irish, 6.0% were American, and 5.6% were Italian.

Of the 37,220 households, 32.4% had children under the age of 18 living with them, 44.9% were married couples living together, 15.2% had a female householder with no husband present, 35.1% were non-families, and 25.3% of all households were made up of individuals. The average household size was 2.53 and the average family size was 3.01. The median age was 35.7 years.

The median income for a household in the county was $50,752 and the median income for a family was $62,150. Males had a median income of $42,408 versus $34,544 for females. The per capita income for the county was $25,505. About 7.8% of families and 14.3% of the population were below the poverty line, including 16.7% of those under age 18 and 8.5% of those age 65 or over.

=== 2000 census ===
As of the census of 2000, there were 84,644 people, 32,218 households, and 21,779 families living in the county. The population density was 224 inhabitants per square mile (86/km^{2}). There were 34,401 housing units at an average density of 91 per square mile (35/km^{2}). The racial makeup of the county was 72.58% White, 23.29% Black or African American, 0.22% Native American, 1.75% Asian, 0.02% Pacific Islander, 0.80% from other races, and 1.34% from two or more races. 2.18% of the population were Hispanic or Latino of any race.

The largest ancestry groups in Wicomico County are 23% African American, 14% English American, 13% German, 12% Irish and 4% Italian.

There were 32,218 households, out of which 32.30% had children under the age of 18 living with them, 49.20% were married couples living together, 14.10% had a female householder with no husband present, and 32.40% were non-families. 24.80% of all households were made up of individuals, and 9.80% had someone living alone who was 65 years of age or older. The average household size was 2.53 and the average family size was 3.00.

In the county the population was spread out, with 24.80% under the age of 18, 11.80% from 18 to 24, 28.00% from 25 to 44, 22.60% from 45 to 64, and 12.80% who were 65 years of age or older. The median age was 36 years. For every 100 females there were 91.00 males. For every 100 females age 18 and over, there were 86.80 males.

The median income for a household in the county was $39,035, and the median income for a family was $47,129. Males had a median income of $32,481 versus $23,548 for females. The per capita income for the county was $19,171. About 8.70% of families and 12.80% of the population were below the poverty line, including 15.60% of those under age 18 and 8.80% of those age 65 or over.

== Education ==
=== Primary and secondary schools ===
Wicomico County Public Schools operates all public schools in the county.

==== Private schools ====
- Faith Baptist School
- Salisbury Baptist Academy
- St. Francis de Sales
- Salisbury Christian School
- Stepping Stones Learning Academy
- The Salisbury School
- Wicomico Day School

=== Colleges and universities ===
- Salisbury University
- Wor-Wic Community College

== Economy ==
Perdue Farms, a poultry and grain corporation, is headquartered in Salisbury. Piedmont Airlines is headquartered at Salisbury–Ocean City–Wicomico Regional Airport in unincorporated Wicomico County. Other major employers in the county include Salisbury University, Verizon, TidalHealth Peninsula Regional, The Knowland Group, Chesapeake Shipbuilding, Walmart, Sam's Club, Wor-Wic Community College, and Dove Pointe.

Other industries in Wicomico County include electronic component manufacturing, shipbuilding, and agriculture.

== Transportation ==
U.S. 13 runs north–south through the county, while U.S. 50 runs east–west through the county.

Salisbury–Ocean City–Wicomico Regional Airport is the only airport in the region offering commercial passenger fights. These flights are run by American Eagle to Philadelphia, Pennsylvania and Charlotte, North Carolina.

Until 1957 the Pennsylvania railroad operated the Del-Mar-Va Express train from Cape Charles, Virginia, through Salisbury Union Station to Philadelphia.

== Media ==
=== Periodicals ===
- Coastal Style - bimonthly magazine
- The Daily Times - daily newspaper
- Metropolitan Magazine - monthly magazine
- Salisbury Independent - weekly newspaper
- Salisbury Star - monthly newspaper

=== Television ===
Salisbury is the focus city of a larger Delmarva television market, which includes Dover and the northern Eastern Shore of Virginia. Most of the market's major-network affiliates are based in Salisbury, including WBOC-TV (CBS, Telemundo, NBC, and Fox), WMDT (ABC and The CW), and Maryland Public Television station WCPB (PBS).

== Communities ==
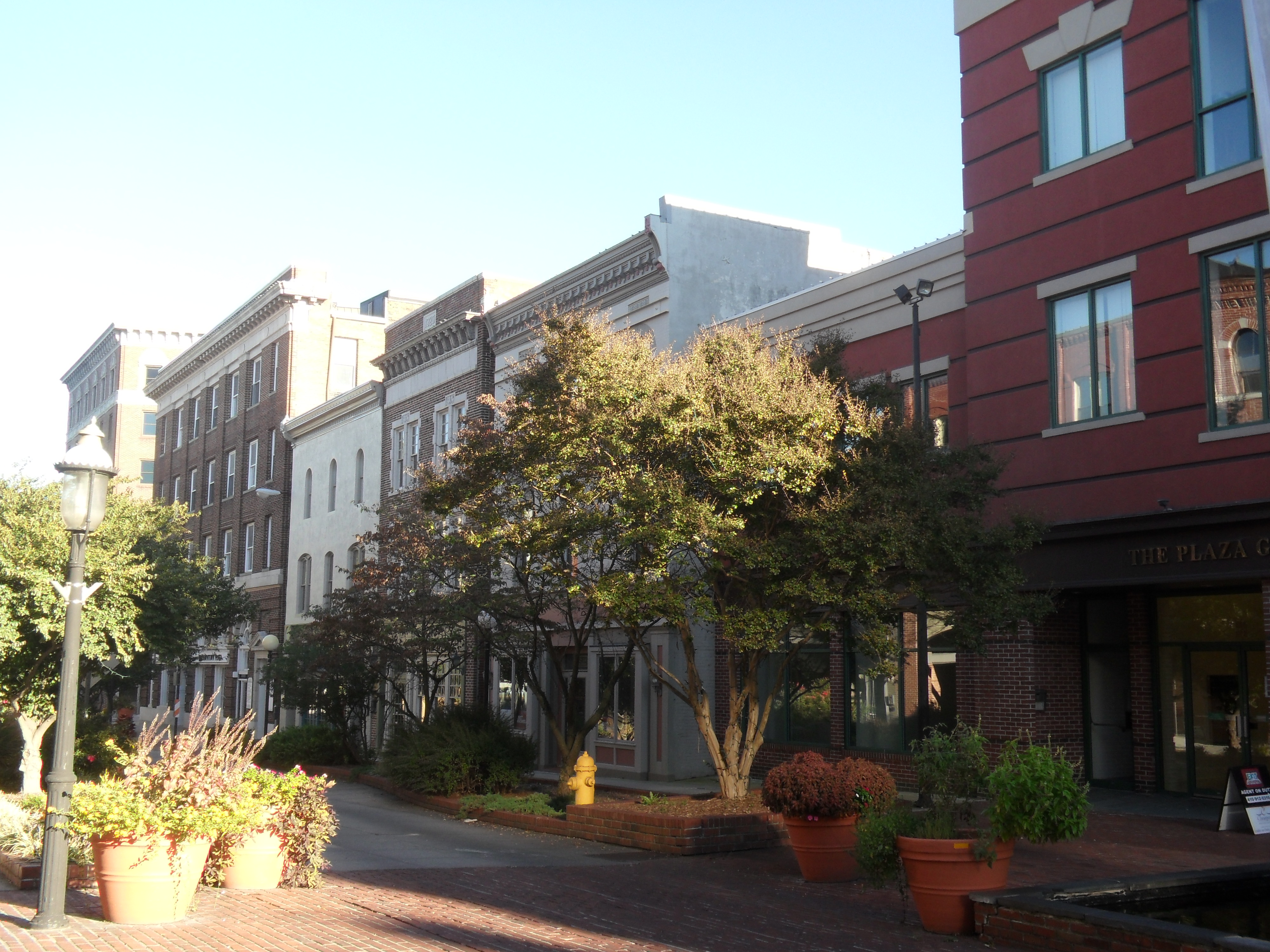
Salisbury

=== Cities ===
- Fruitland
- Salisbury (county seat)

=== Towns ===
- Delmar
- Hebron
- Mardela Springs
- Pittsville
- Sharptown
- Willards

=== Census-designated places ===
- Allen
- Bivalve
- Jesterville
- Nanticoke
- Nanticoke Acres
- Parsonsburg
- Powellville
- Quantico
- Tyaskin
- Waterview
- Whitehaven

=== Unincorporated communities ===
- Doe Run
- Silver Run
- Wetipquin
- Whiton (partly in Worcester County)

== Notable people ==
- Erin Burnett, born in Mardela Springs, CNBC host and currently host of Erin Burnett OutFront on CNN
- Joseph Stewart Cottman (1803–1863), born near Allen, United States Congressman from Maryland
- Alexis Denisof, born in Salisbury, actor best known for How I Met Your Mother and Angel
- Lewis J. Fields, born in Delmar, United States Marine Corps Lieutenant General
- John Glover, reared in Salisbury, actor
- Linda Hamilton, born in Salisbury, actress best known for her starring role in the television series Beauty and the Beast and the films The Terminator and Terminator 2: Judgment Day
- Maulana Karenga, born and lived in Parsonsburg, activist, author, and professor of Africana studies, best known as the creator of Kwanzaa
- Sarah Louise Northcott, convicted of murder in 1928 in Riverside County, California, and served 12 years in prison, for her role in the Wineville Chicken Coop murders—after her parole in 1940, she moved to Parsonsburg, where she resided until her death in 1944
- Frank Perdue, former president and CEO of Perdue Farms

== See also ==
- National Register of Historic Places listings in Wicomico County, Maryland
