= U.S. Route 50 Business (Salisbury, Maryland) =

Highway in Maryland

U.S. Route 50 Business

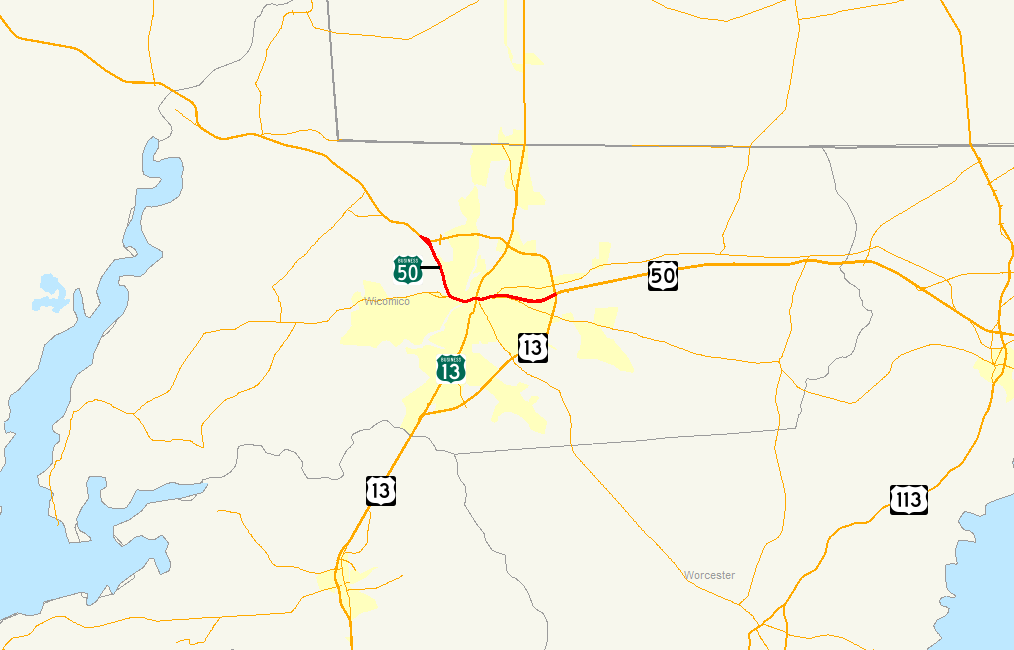

Route information
- Auxiliary route of US 50
- Maintained by MDSHA
- Length: 6.88 mi (11.07 km)
- Existed: 2002–present
- Tourist routes: Chesapeake Country Scenic Byway

Major junctions
- West end: US 50 west of Salisbury
- MD 349 in Salisbury US 13 Bus. in Salisbury MD 346 in Salisbury
- East end: US 13 / US 50 east of Salisbury

Location
- Country: United States
- State: Maryland
- Counties: Wicomico

Highway system
- United States Numbered Highway System; List; Special; Divided; Maryland highway system; Interstate; US; State; Scenic Byways

U.S. Route 50 Business (US 50 Business) is a business route of U.S. Route 50 in the U.S. state of Maryland. The highway runs 6.88 miles (11.07 km) from US 50 on the northwest side of Salisbury to US 13 and US 50 on the east side of Salisbury in central Wicomico County. US 50 Business is a four- to six-lane divided highway within and on either side of the central business district of Salisbury, where the highway intersects MD 349, US 13 Business, and MD 346. US 50 Business west of MD 349 is a mid-1950s upgrade of the original highway entering Salisbury from the northwest. The business route between MD 349 and MD 346 was a relocation of US 50 from Main Street built in the early 1960s. East of MD 346, US 50 Business is part of the relocation of US 50 between Salisbury and Berlin completed in the mid-1960s. US 50 Business was designated when the US 50 portion of the Salisbury Bypass was completed in 2002.

== Route description ==
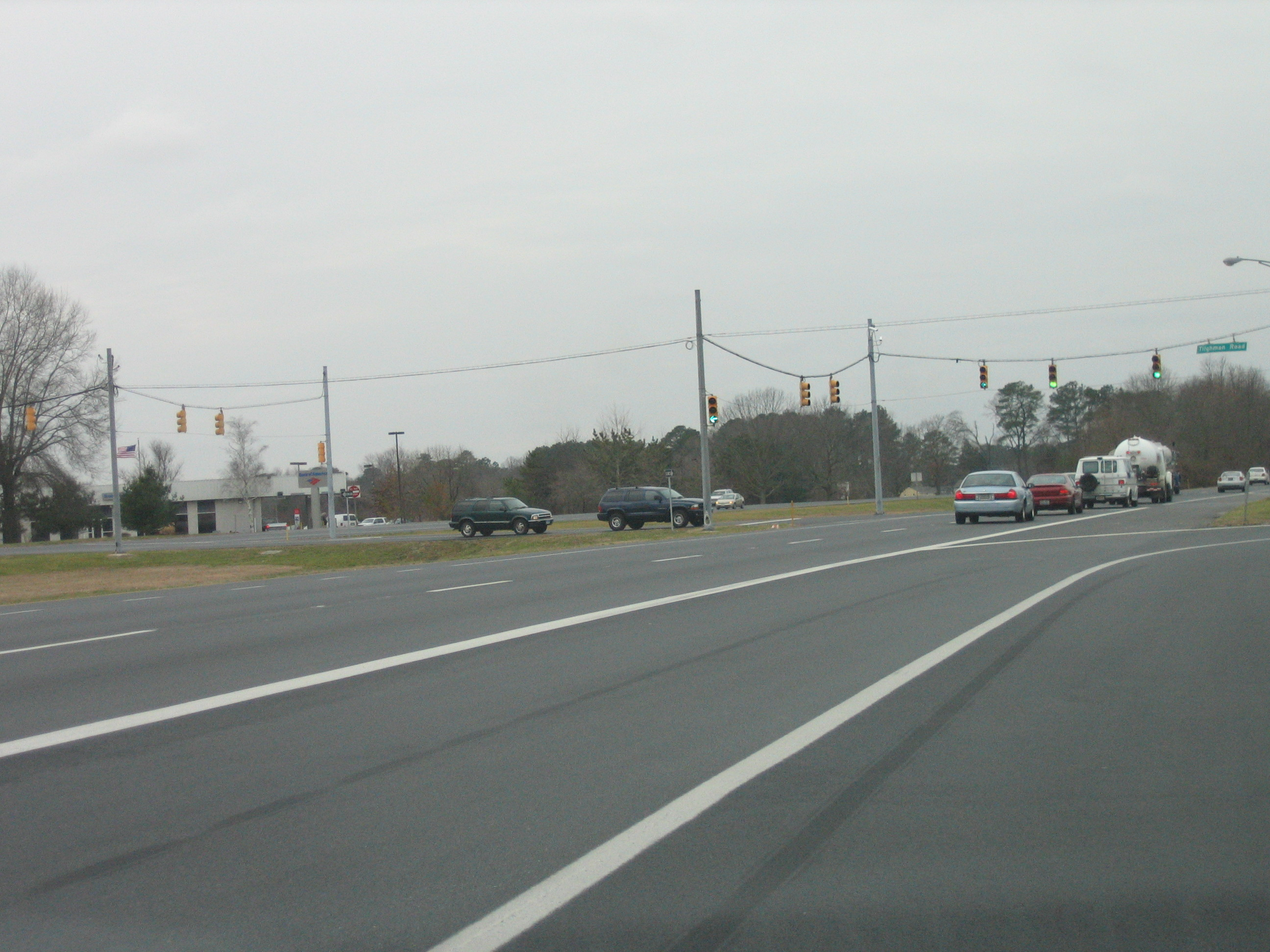
US 50 Bus. at Tilghman Road in Salisbury.

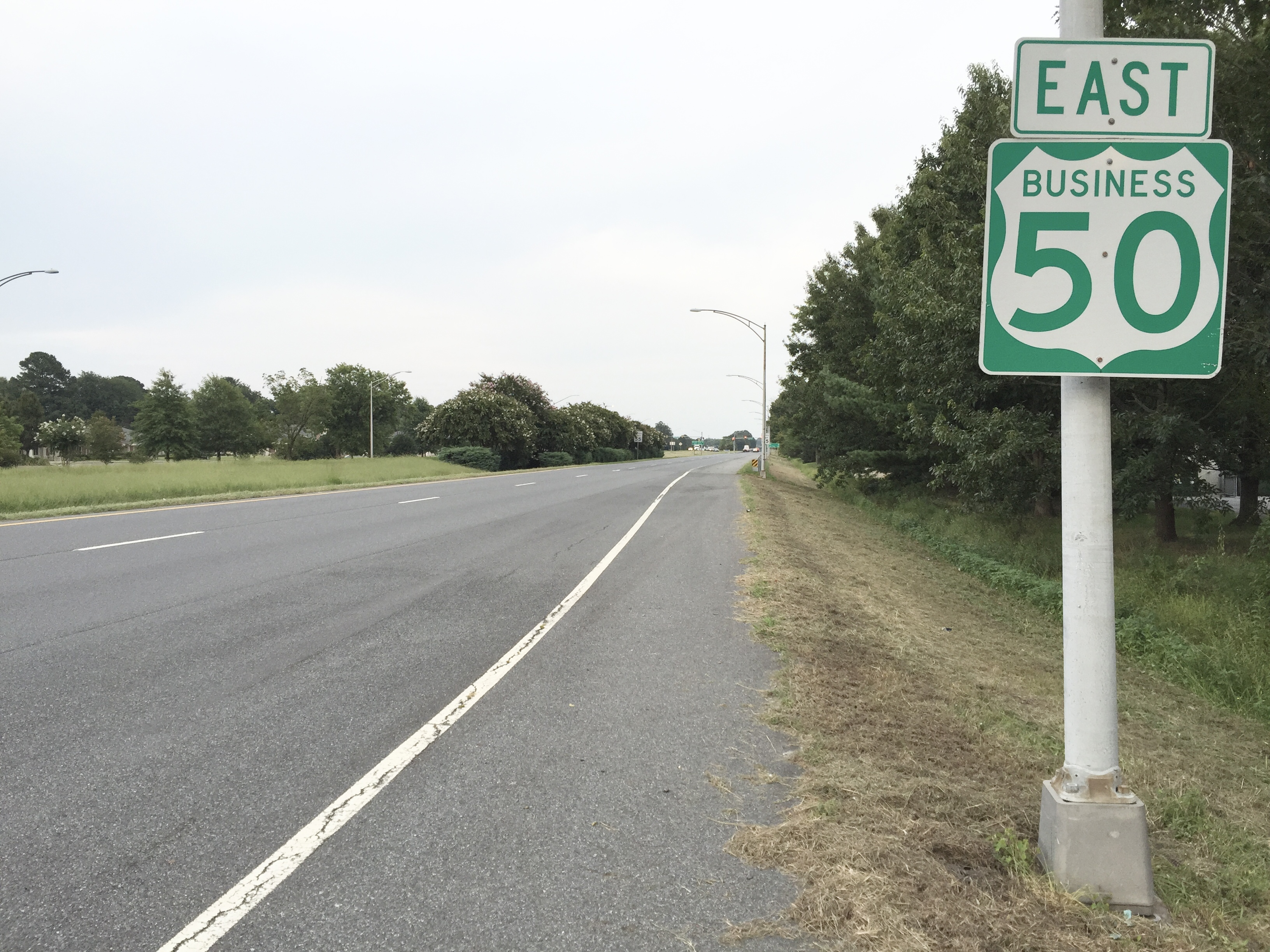
View east along US 50 Bus. at Civic Avenue in Salisbury

US 50 Business begins at a partial interchange with US 50, with ramps from US 50 east to US 50 Business east and US 50 Business west to US 50 west. One lane of westbound US 50 Business continues beyond the ramp to an intersection with Stanton Avenue, a service road for residences detached from US 50 when the interchange was built. The movements missing from the interchange are completed via Naylor Mill Road just to the east of the partial interchange. US 50 Business heads southeast toward downtown Salisbury as a four-lane divided highway. After passing American Legion Road, the business route enters the city limits of Salisbury and its name changes to Salisbury Parkway. At the intersection with MD 349 (Nanticoke Road) and Isabella Street, US 50 Business turns east, expands to six lanes, becomes a partially controlled access highway, and begins to parallel Main Street, the original alignment of US 50.

After crossing the North Prong of the Wicomico River on a drawbridge, the business route intersects Division Street, the original alignment of US 13. The highway drops to four lanes as ramps to Baptist Street heading eastbound and from Broad Street heading westbound leave the highway; these streets are used to access US 13 Business (Salisbury Boulevard). US 50 Business expands to six lanes again after passing under US 13 Business and the Delmarva Subdivision track of the Delmarva Central Railroad. The business route returns to four lanes after the intersection with MD 346 (Main Street), which is the original alignment of US 50. The median expands as US 50 Business passes commercial and industrial properties. A park and ride lot is located at the southeast corner of the Phillip Morris Drive intersection. Shortly after the intersection with Tilghman Road, the business route reaches its eastern terminus at a partial cloverleaf interchange with the Salisbury Bypass, which features US 13 and US 50 west. The divided highway continues east as US 50 (Ocean Gateway) toward Ocean City.

US 50 Business is a part of the National Highway System as a principal arterial for its entire length.

== History ==
The original east–west highway through Salisbury entered the city from Hebron along its present course from the northwest to Isabella Street. The highway then followed Main Street to downtown Salisbury. The highway followed Broad Street to Church Street, which the road followed east toward Parsonsburg. This highway was one of the original state roads designated for improvement by the Maryland State Roads Commission (SRC) in 1909. The state roads from Hebron to the western limit of Salisbury and from the eastern limit of Salisbury to Parsonsburg were both completed in 1914. The SRC directed two major changes on Main Street in the mid-1920s. First, the SRC took over maintenance of the drawbridge over the North Prong of the Wicomico River in 1924 and completed its replacement in 1928. While Main Street is no longer a state highway, MDSHA continues to maintain the Main Street drawbridge. The drawbridge was reconstructed in 1980 and is designated as MD 991, which is unsigned. Secondly, the SRC extended Main Street east from downtown along its present course east and then northeast to Church Street in 1926. US 213 was designated as the main east–west highway through Salisbury in 1927. US 213 was moved from Church Street to Main Street around 1940. US 50 replaced US 213 through Salisbury in 1949.

US 50 through Salisbury was upgraded in three portions in the 1950s and 1960s. US 50 west of Isabella Street was expanded to a four-lane divided highway northwest to Naylor Mill Road in 1954. Planning for what became Salisbury Parkway between Isabella Street and Main Street east of downtown began after World War II, when right-of-way estimates were made on routes along Isabella Street and Church Street. By 1956, right-of-way purchases and condemnation of buildings had begun; the highway was completed by 1964. US 50 east of Main Street was relocated in 1965 when the four-lane highway from there to Berlin was completed. While the US 13 portion of the Salisbury Bypass was completed in 1981, construction on the extension west to US 50 to allow that highway to bypass downtown Salisbury did not begin until May 2000. The US 50 portion of the bypass was completed in October 2002; US 50 Business was assigned to the highway through Salisbury at the same time.

== Junction list ==
The entire route is in Wicomico County.

Location	mi	km	Destinations	Notes
	0.00	0.00	US 50 west (Ocean Gateway) – Cambridge, Bay Bridge	Western terminus of US 50 Business and Salisbury Bypass; eastbound exit and westbound entrance from US 50
	0.60	0.97	Naylor Mill Road east to US 50 east (Salisbury Bypass) – Ocean City	
Salisbury	2.52	4.06	MD 349 west (Nanticoke Road) / Isabella Street east – Quantico, Nanticoke	Eastern terminus of MD 349
Salisbury	3.62	5.83	US 13 Bus. (Salisbury Boulevard) – Fruitland, Delmar	Eastbound exit and westbound entrance
Salisbury	4.39	7.07	MD 346 east (Main Street) / Main Street west – Parsonsburg	Western terminus of MD 346; old alignment of US 50
Salisbury	6.88	11.07	US 13 (Salisbury Bypass) / US 50 (Ocean Gateway) – Cambridge, Ocean City, Dover, Norfolk	Eastern terminus of US 50 Business; partial cloverleaf interchange
1.000 mi = 1.609 km; 1.000 km = 0.621 mi: Incomplete access
