= Maryland Route 513 =

State highway in Maryland, United States

Maryland Route 513

Route information
- Maintained by MDSHA
- Length: 1.77 mi (2.85 km)
- Existed: 1982–present

Major junctions
- South end: Jackson Road near Fruitland
- US 13 in Fruitland
- North end: US 13 Bus. in Fruitland

Location
- Country: United States
- State: Maryland
- Counties: Wicomico

Highway system
- Maryland highway system; Interstate; US; State; Scenic Byways
← MD 509	→ MD 514

Maryland Route 513 (MD 513) is a state highway in the U.S. state of Maryland. Known for much of its length as Cedar Lane, the state highway runs 1.77 miles (2.85 km) from Jackson Road just south of the interchange with U.S. Route 13 (US 13) north to US 13 Business, almost entirely within Fruitland. MD 513 was constructed as a county highway around 1980 following the completion of the highway's interchange with the Salisbury Bypass and became a state highway in 1982.

== Route description ==
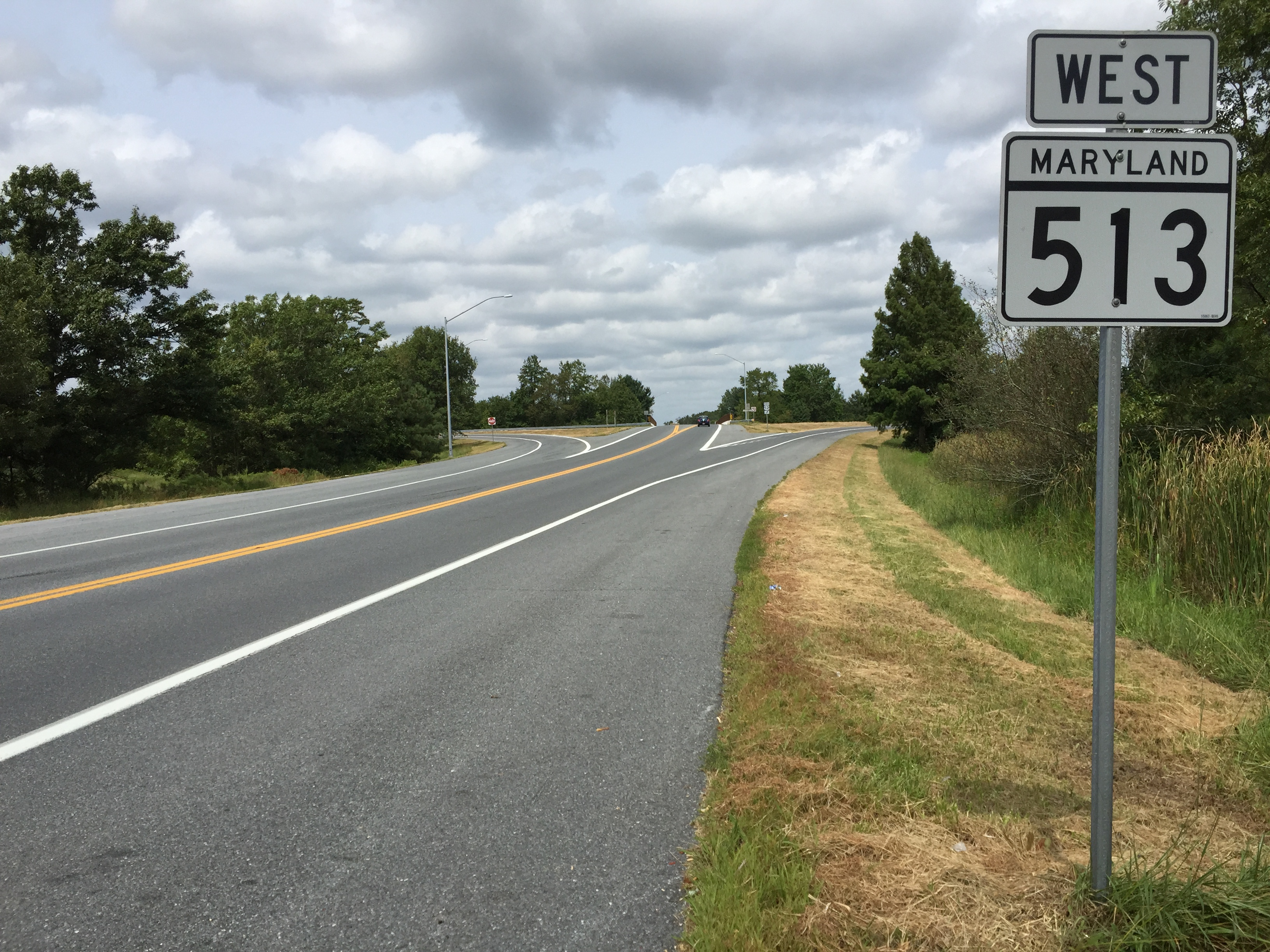
View west along MD 513 at US 13 just south of Fruitland

MD 513 begins at an intersection with Jackson Road just south of its diamond interchange with US 13 (Salisbury Bypass). St. Lukes Road continues south as a county highway toward MD 12. MD 513 heads north a two-lane undivided road, entering the city of Fruitland at the intersection where St. Lukes Road splits to the northwest. The state highway continues north as Cedar Lane and meets Division Street at a roundabout. After crossing the Delmarva Central Railroad's Delmarva Subdivision track at-grade, the state highway meets its northern terminus at US 13 Business (Fruitland Boulevard). Cedar Lane continues north through Fruitland toward Camden Avenue, the original alignment of US 13.

== History ==
Cedar Lane was extended south to St. Lukes Road on the edge of Fruitland in 1979 to provide a more direct connection from US 13 to St. Lukes Road's interchange with the Salisbury Bypass, which was completed in 1981. MD 513 was assigned along its present route in 1982. The roundabout at the junction with Division Street was installed in 2007.

== Junction list ==
The entire route is in Fruitland, Wicomico County.

mi	km	Destinations	Notes
0.00	0.00	St. Lukes Road south / Jackson Road east	Southern terminus
0.20	0.32	US 13 (Salisbury Bypass) – Dover, Norfolk	Diamond interchange
1.77	2.85	US 13 Bus. (Fruitland Boulevard) / Cedar Lane west – Princess Anne, Salisbury	Northern terminus
1.000 mi = 1.609 km; 1.000 km = 0.621 mi
