= Union Station (Salisbury, Maryland) =

Historic railway station in Maryland, United States

- U.S. National Register of Historic Places
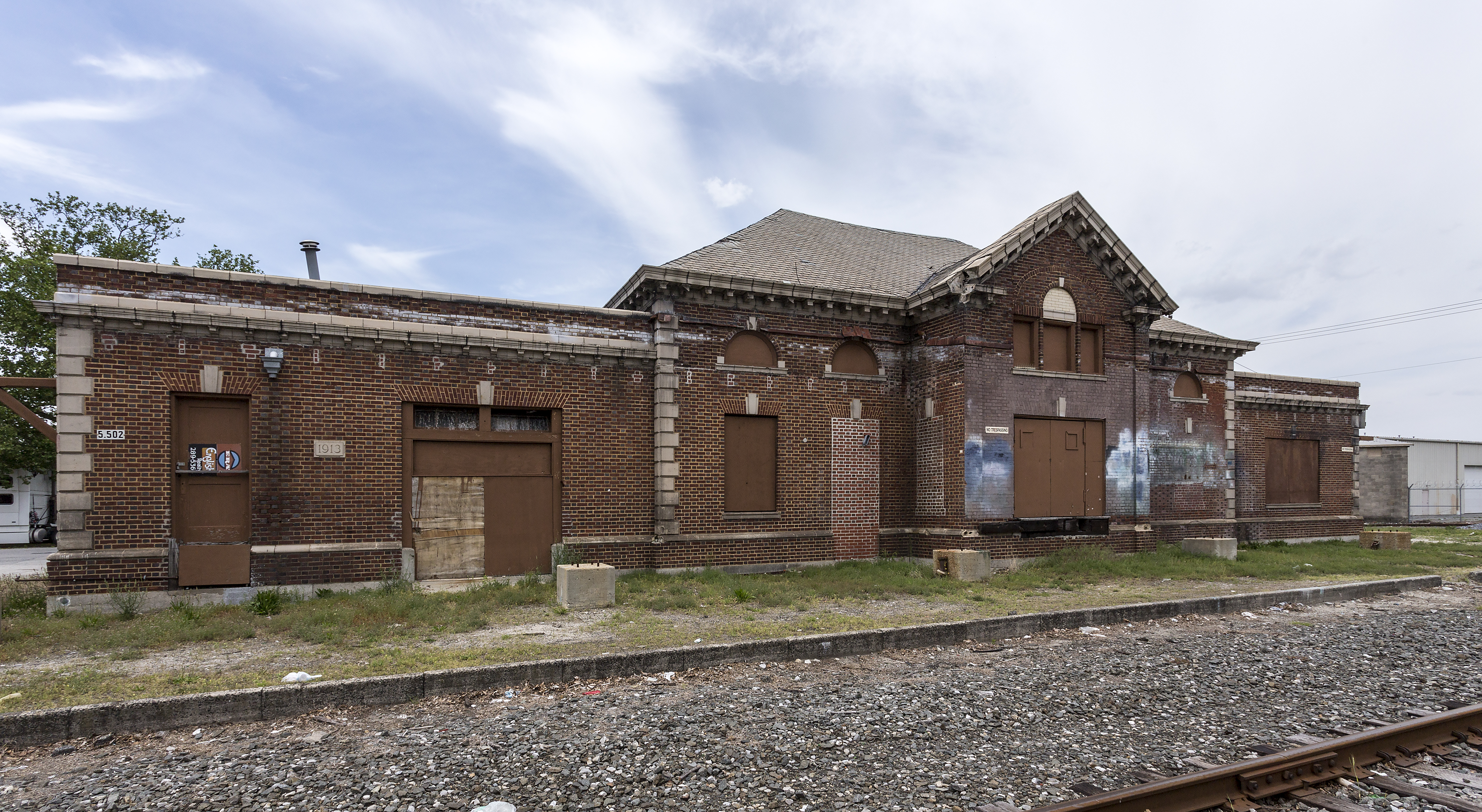
- Union Station in 2014

- Location within Maryland Location within the United States
- Location: 611 Railroad Ave., Salisbury, Maryland
- Coordinates: 38°22′16″N 75°35′35″W
- Area: 0.7 acres (0.28 ha)
- Built: 1913
- Architectural style: Colonial Revival
- NRHP reference No.: 07000389
- Added to NRHP: May 2, 2007

Union Station is a historic railway station located at Salisbury, Wicomico County, Maryland, United States. It was constructed in 1913–14, near the junction where the New York, Philadelphia & Norfolk Railroad intersected with the Baltimore, Chesapeake and Atlantic Railroad (later, the Baltimore & Eastern Railroad) in the center of Salisbury. Both railroads became part of the Pennsylvania Railroad (PRR). It has a 1 1/2-story, Flemish bond brick main block covered by a medium-pitched hip roof sheathed in slate, with single-story wings. From the 1920s to the 1950s, the PRR ran several passenger trains a day, including the Del-Mar-Va Express, through the station, north–south from Philadelphia to Cape Charles, Virginia.

The PRR terminated passenger service in 1958. It was converted from a passenger station into a freight facility, and since 1986 the station used for other commercial purposes. The building has characteristics of the Colonial Revival style and was the most elaborate passenger facility to survive on the Eastern Shore of Maryland.

Union Station was listed on the National Register of Historic Places in 2007.

== Passenger service ==
Until the mid-1950s the Pennsylvania Railroad ran the day train, the Del-Mar-Va Express, from Philadelphia in the north, through Salisbury to Cape Charles, Virginia to the southern end of the Delmarva Peninsula. The PRR in the same period operated a night train, the Cavalier, on the route.

Into the 1930s, the Baltimore and Eastern Railroad operated passenger service from Love Point on the eastern shore of the Chesapeake Bay through Salisbury to Ocean City. Into the 1920s, that company's predecessor, the Baltimore, Chesapeake and Atlantic Railway, was running trains from Claiborne on the eastern Chesapeake shore to Easton, Salisbury and Ocean City.

| Preceding station | Pennsylvania Railroad | Following station |
|---|---|---|
| Fruitland toward Cape Charles | Delmarva Division | Delmar toward Wilmington |
| West Main Street toward Claiborne | Baltimore, Chesapeake and Atlantic Railway | Walstons toward Ocean City |
