= Del-Mar-Va Express =

Historic passenger rail route of the Pennsylvania Railroad

Overview
- Service type: Inter-city rail
- Status: Discontinued
- Locale: Mid-Atlantic States
- First service: 1926; 100 years ago
- Last service: 1957; 69 years ago
- Former operator: Pennsylvania Railroad

Route
- Termini: Philadelphia, Pennsylvania; connecting train from New York, New York; Cape Charles, Virginia, with connection to ferry to Norfolk, Virginia
- Distance travelled: 219 miles (352 km) (Philadelphia - Cape Charles)
- Average journey time: Southbound (Philadelphia - Cape Charles): 5 hours, 50 minutes; northbound: 5 hours, 45 minutes
- Service frequency: Daily
- Train numbers: Southbound: 455; Northbound: 454

On-board services
- Seating arrangements: Coaches
- Catering facilities: Dining cars: Philadelphia - Delmar, Delaware; New York City - Wilmington, Delaware (1950)
- Observation facilities: Parlor cars: Philadelphia - Cape Charles; New York City - Wilmington

Technical
- Track gauge: 4 ft 8 1/2 in (1,435 mm)

The Del-Mar-Va Express was a named passenger train of the Pennsylvania Railroad that at its peak went from New York City to the southernmost point of the Delmarva Peninsula, Cape Charles, Virginia. Initiated in 1926, the train's north–south passage through Delaware stood in contrast with the main passenger traffic through Delaware being a brief passage through cities in the upper reach of Delaware, mainly Wilmington. Most importantly, the train served as a more direct path from New York City and Philadelphia to Norfolk, Virginia, by way of a ferry from Cape Charles across the Chesapeake Bay to Norfolk, a path that bypassed Baltimore and Washington, D.C. This saved time in comparison to travel over PRR, Atlantic Coast Line and Norfolk & Western trains through Washington to Norfolk. The Del-Mar-Va trip, including ferry travel was 11 hours from New York; and the longer all-land route through Washington was 13 hours and 40 minutes.

The train succeeded an earlier short lived train, the Old Point, in the 1890s from Philadelphia to Cape Charles. The Del-Mar-Va-Express diverged south from the Pennsylvania RR's Washington-Philadelphia route at Wilmington. From there went directly south along the main line of a Pennsylvania Railroad's subsidiary, the New York, Philadelphia and Norfolk Railroad, through inland towns in Delaware, notably: Clayton, Dover, Harrington, Greenwood, Seaford and Delmar; in Maryland: Salisbury, Princess Anne and Pocomoke City; and finally reaching Cape Charles, where the N. Y. P. & N RR Ferry Company would take passengers to Norfolk. Beginning in the 1940s the PRR began to rely only on the Virginia Ferry Corporation for ferriage of passengers from Cape Charles to Norfolk. This new service showed a cross-channel time savings of 40 minutes. From 1942 to 1947 the train's northern terminus was extended from Philadelphia to New York.

== Transfer stations ==
The stations for Clayton, Harrington, Greenwood, Salisbury and Princess Anne in pre-World War II years of the train were points from which passengers could transfer to trains to the Eastern Shore of Maryland or to ocean-side resort towns of Lewes, Delaware and Ocean City, Maryland.

== Nighttime counterpart ==
In a parallel period with the Del-Mar-Va, the PRR operated a night train, the Cavalier (#469, southbound, #468 northbound), which until the early 1950s carried coaches as well as sleeping cars with open sections and double bedrooms, continuous to New York. In peak years, such as 1941, a separate sleeping car train (in contrast to the New York originating train) left the PRR's downtown Broad Street Station and joined with the rest of the train in Wilmington. Between late 1954 and summer 1955, the Cavalier no longer had sleeping cars. By summer 1956 the overnight train was terminated.

== Decline ==
The train was discontinued by late 1957. By then, a nighttime itinerary unnamed train was the sole train serving the peninsula.

== See also ==
- New York, Philadelphia and Norfolk Railroad
- Train ferry: United States for a list of current and former car floats and train ferries
