= Salisbury Regional Airport =

Salisbury-Ocean City: Wicomico Regional Airport Salisbury Regional Airport

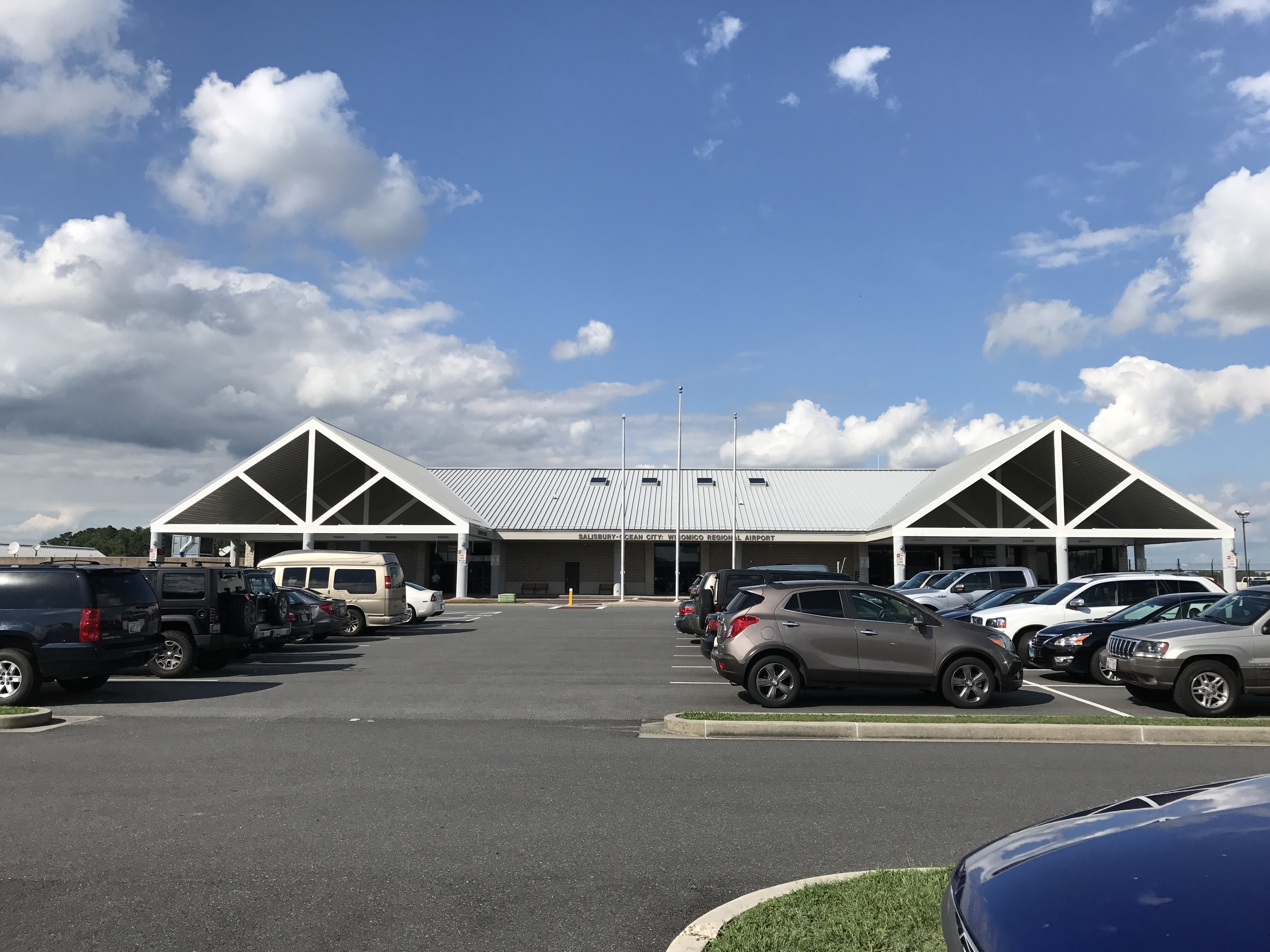
- IATA: SBY; ICAO: KSBY; FAA LID: SBY

Summary
- Airport type: Public
- Owner: Wicomico County
- Operator: Wicomico County Department of Aviation
- Serves: Salisbury, Maryland, U.S.
- Location: Salisbury, Maryland, U.S.
- Opened: November 11, 1943; 83 years ago
- Elevation AMSL: 53 ft (16 m)
- Coordinates: 38°20′24″N 75°30′34″W
- Website: www.flysbyairport.com

Maps
- FAA airport diagram
- Interactive map of Salisbury-Ocean City: Wicomico Regional Airport

Runways
Direction	Length		Surface
Direction	ft	m	Surface
14/32	7,600	2,316	Asphalt
5/23	5,000	1,524	Asphalt

Statistics (2018)
- Enplanements: 64,393
- Statistics: FAA passenger boarding data

Salisbury-Ocean City: Wicomico Regional Airport (IATA: SBY, ICAO: KSBY, FAA LID: SBY), or, more succinctly Salisbury Regional Airport, is located in unincorporated Wicomico County, Maryland, 5 miles (8.0 km) southeast from downtown Salisbury, Maryland, United States. Salisbury is the largest metropolitan area of Maryland's Eastern Shore with a population of 405,803 in the metropolitan statistical area, and is centrally located on the Delmarva Peninsula.

Since SBY Regional Airport is the only commercial airport with daily scheduled flights in the area, it also serves Delaware, the Eastern Shore of Virginia, and the Eastern Shore of Maryland, which include the other towns of Ocean City, Cambridge, and Easton. American Eagle operates three round trip flights per day to Charlotte Douglas International Airport, and one round trip flight per day to Philadelphia International Airport.

Breeze Airways operates direct flights to and from Orlando International Airport three times a week (Mondays, Wednesdays, and Fridays) and to and from Fort Lauderdale–Hollywood International Airport twice a week (Wednesdays and Saturdays).

== History ==
In 1940, Wicomico County and the City of Salisbury begun to construct the airport with the Works Progress Administration. It originally encompassed 695 acres and cost $1.5 million. Officially opened on November 11, 1943, Salisbury was originally leased to the U.S. Navy as a training base during World War II up through 1945.

After the war ended, Airfield Operating Corp. leased the airport beginning commercial activity to Easton, Baltimore, and Washington, D.C. Later, in 1949 the City and County resume management of the airport and All American Airways takes over for Chesapeake Airways, later superseded in 1950 by Allegheny Airlines. Numerous improvement projects including runway resurfacing and taxiway lights were installed in the 1960s. Henson Aviation, under contract with Allegheny Airlines and owned by Richard A. Henson, began scheduled commuter service in 1968 and operated with the idea of using "frequency" flights using small aircraft which would shuttle passengers to many airports along the east coast. However, Allegheny discontinued the service in 1969. In 1971, the City of Salisbury relinquishes its interest to the county. In 1978, the Maryland State Police establish a medevac helicopter base.

In 1983, Henson Aviation was purchased by Piedmont Airlines and began operating as Henson, The Piedmont Regional Airline. Henson Airways reigned as the primary air service provider in Salisbury until US Airways Express purchased Henson Aviation in 1993. After the merger, the airline was renamed Piedmont and it deemed Salisbury as its primary operating base and quickly grew into a large regional carrier. After opening the base, the airline operated flights to Philadelphia and Washington. A few years later, Piedmont opened a new hub in Charlotte, North Carolina which rapidly grew to become larger than its hub in Washington, D.C. The service to Washington was later cancelled and was replaced with service to Charlotte..

In 2017, the airport re-branded itself SBY Regional Airport.

== Airport construction and expansion ==
Several construction projects were recently completed in late 2011 to extend runway 14-32 an extra 1,000 feet (300 m) to a length of 6,400 feet (2,000 m). Along with the main runway being extended, the taxiways around the runway were extended and a new ILS system was installed with new approaches. These multimillion-dollar projects will allow flights using larger aircraft such as regional jets which had previously been unable to operate at the airport due to the short length of the runway. Today, the airport spans 1,081 acres (437 ha) and is the second-largest in the state of Maryland. In 2016, a plan was announced to again extend runway 14-32 an additional 600 feet (180 m) to 7,000 feet (2,100 m). In 2017, it was announced that the interior of the terminal would be updated with a coastal theme.

== Facilities ==
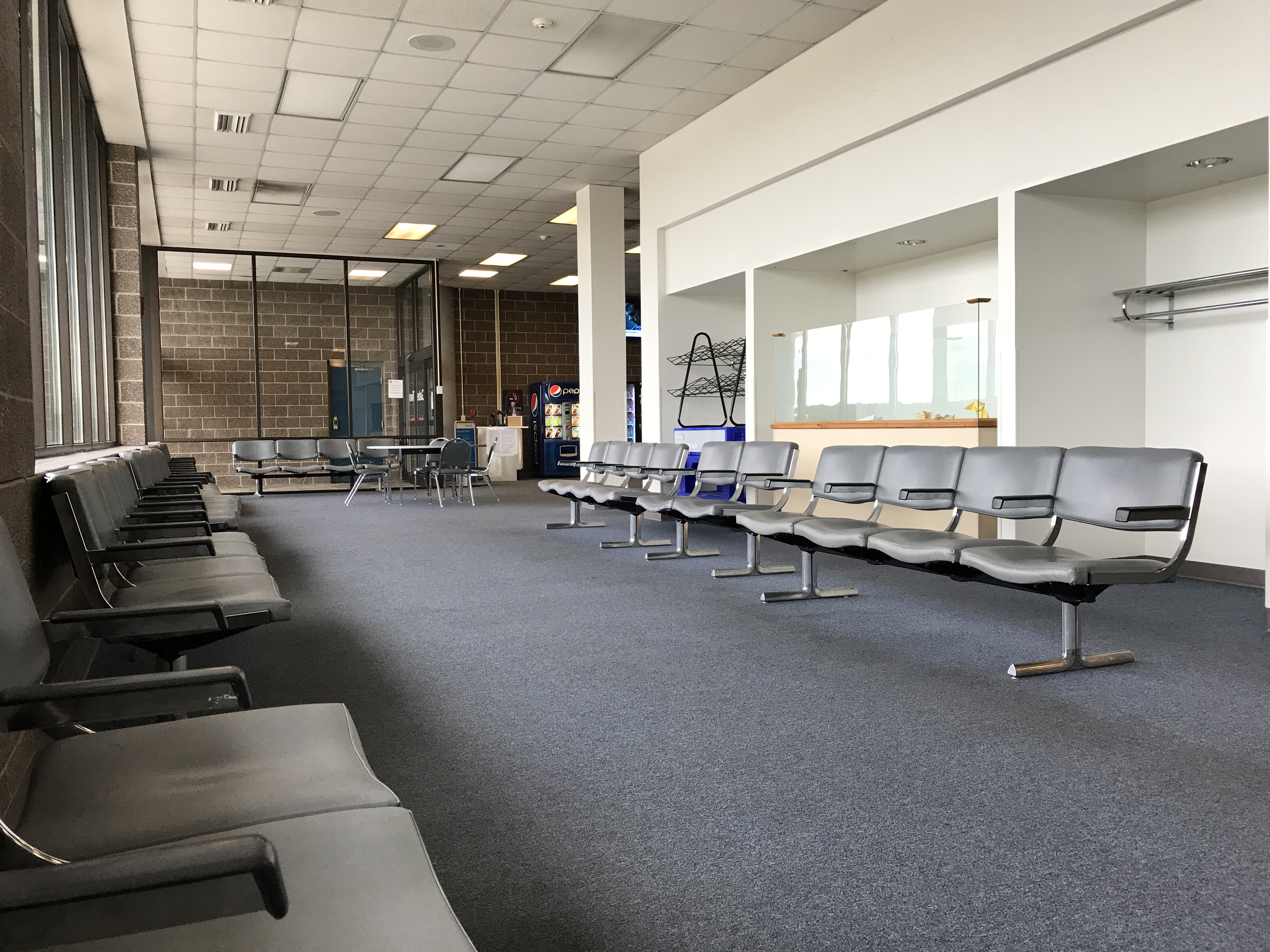
American Eagle gate area at Salisbury–Ocean City–Wicomico Regional Airport

The Richard A. Henson Terminal is a 26,000 square feet (2,400 m^{2}) building opened in 1990. There is an American Eagle ticket counter and a TSA bag scanning area at the southeast part of the building. Two departure gates, one arrival gate, and security checkpoints are in the middle and northwest part of the terminal.

The terminal is surrounded by 6 acres (2.4 ha) of parking apron which services the arriving and departing aircraft. Avis, Hertz, and Enterprise all operate automobile rental services in the arrival terminal.

In 2022, airport parking was upgraded to an automated parking system, from the previous contractor staffed gate.

This airport has a 24/7 (365) Maryland State Police Aviation Command helicopter on site.

== Fixed-base operators ==
Bayland Aviation is the fixed-base operator at Salisbury. Jet fuel and Avgas are handled and supplied by Bayland. They also offer public flight training using a group of small Cessna and Piper aircraft. Charter flights can be scheduled through Bayland to multiple destinations throughout the East Coast.

== Airlines and destinations ==
The airport is the operational headquarters for American Eagle carrier Piedmont Airlines. In 2012, Piedmont established a passenger record of 150,086 passengers.

Breeze Airways began flying to Salisbury on October 1, 2025 with service from Orlando, Florida. On July 1, 2026, Breeze added a second direct destination to Salisbury with flights from Fort Lauderdale, Florida.

=== Passenger ===
Airlines	Destinations	Refs
American Eagle	Charlotte, Philadelphia	
Breeze Airways	Fort Lauderdale, Orlando	

==== Terminated passenger airline services ====
Piedmont previously served Salisbury with flights to Washington, D.C., and Baltimore. The service to Washington was on and off until 2008; the Baltimore service stopped in late 2009.

Allegiant Air began twice a week service to Orlando-Sanford International Airport in February 2012, using its McDonnell Douglas MD-80 jets, but ended the route less than a year later on January 5, 2013, due to the route's relatively small number of passengers.

== Statistics ==
=== Top Destinations ===
Busiest domestic routes (May 2025 – April 2026)
Rank	City	Passengers	Carrier
1	Charlotte, North Carolina	46,490	American
2	Philadelphia, Pennsylvania	16,030	American
3	Orlando, Florida	6,360	Breeze

=== Annual Traffic ===
Annual Traffic
Year	Passengers	Change from Previous Year	Total Cargo (Freight & Mail) (lbs.)	Change from Previous Year
2005	128,000		1,927,000	
2006	123,000	▼3.91%	2,034,000	▲5.59%
2007	120,000	▼2.44%	2,049,000	▲0.72%
2008	117,000	▼2.50%	1,708,000	▼16.66%
2009	118,000	▲0.85%	1,681,000	▼1.55%
2010	129,000	▲9.32%	1,868,000	▲11.14%
2011	144,000	▲11.63%	1,840,000	▼1.53%
2012	150,970	▲4.84%	1,735,000	▼5.72%
2013	123,460	▼18.22%	1,851,000	▲6.70%
2014	123,000	▼0.37%	1,846,000	▼0.28%
2015	122,020	▼0.80%	1,812,000	▼1.84%
2016	116,000	▼4.93%	1,404,000	▼22.52%
2017	113,000	▼2.59%	1,788,000	▲27.41%
2018	128,000	▲13.27%	1,922,000	▲7.46%
2019	139,000	▲8.59%	1,800,000	▼6.35%
2020	68,370	▼50.81%	1,755,000	▼2.51%
2021	118,000	▲72.59%	1,641,000	▼6.48%
2022	94,900	▼19.58%	1,468,000	▼10.57%
2023	104,000	▲9.59%	601,000	▼59.02%
2024	120,000	▲15.38%	48,000	▼92.00%

== See also ==
- List of airports in Maryland
