= Whaleyville, Maryland =

- CDP
- Location of Whaleyville, Maryland
- Coordinates: 38°23′47″N 75°18′5″W
- Country: United States
- State: Maryland
- County: Worcester

Area
  - Total: 1.02 sq mi (2.63 km^{2})
  - Land: 1.02 sq mi (2.63 km^{2})
  - Water: 0 sq mi (0.00 km^{2})
- Elevation: 30 ft (9 m)

Population (2020)
  - Total: 192
  - Density: 189.4/sq mi (73.13/km^{2})
- Time zone: UTC−5 (Eastern (EST))
  - Summer (DST): UTC−4 (EDT)
- ZIP code: 21872
- Area codes: 410, 443
- FIPS code: 24-83746
- GNIS feature ID: 0591697

Whaleyville is a census-designated place in Worcester County, Maryland, United States. The population was 149 at the 2010 census. It is part of the Salisbury, Maryland-Delaware Metropolitan Statistical Area.

== Geography ==
Whaleyville is located at 38°23′47″N 75°18′5″W (38.396470, −75.301292).

According to the United States Census Bureau, the CDP has a total area of 1.0 square mile (2.6 km^{2}), all land.

== Demographics ==
Historical population
Census	Pop.	Note	%±
2020	192		—
U.S. Decennial Census

As of the census of 2000, there were 124 people, 57 households, and 38 families residing in the CDP. The population density was 128.9 inhabitants per square mile (49.8/km^{2}). There were 64 housing units at an average density of 66.5 per square mile (25.7/km^{2}). The racial makeup of the CDP was 95.16% White, 2.42% African American, 2.42% from other races. Hispanic or Latino of any race were 2.42% of the population.

There were 57 households, out of which 22.8% had children under the age of 18 living with them, 52.6% were married couples living together, 12.3% had a female householder with no husband present, and 33.3% were non-families. 28.1% of all households were made up of individuals, and 17.5% had someone living alone who was 65 years of age or older. The average household size was 2.18 and the average family size was 2.66.

In the CDP, the population was spread out, with 16.1% under the age of 18, 7.3% from 18 to 24, 30.6% from 25 to 44, 26.6% from 45 to 64, and 19.4% who were 65 years of age or older. The median age was 43 years. For every 100 females, there were 103.3 males. For every 100 females age 18 and over, there were 96.2 males.

The median income for a household in the CDP was $35,250, and the median income for a family was $39,375. Males had a median income of $24,375 versus $40,682 for females. The per capita income for the CDP was $17,440. There were no families and 5.8% of the population living below the poverty line, including no under eighteens and none of those over 64.
