= Pittsville, Maryland =

- Town
- Seal

- Location of Pittsville, Maryland
- Coordinates: 38°23′41″N 75°24′33″W
- Country: United States
- State: Maryland
- County: Wicomico
- Incorporated: 1906

Area
  - Total: 1.56 sq mi (4.04 km^{2})
  - Land: 1.56 sq mi (4.04 km^{2})
  - Water: 0 sq mi (0.00 km^{2})
- Elevation: 52 ft (16 m)

Population (2020)
  - Total: 1,636
  - Density: 1,048.5/sq mi (404.81/km^{2})
- Time zone: UTC-5 (Eastern (EST))
  - Summer (DST): UTC-4 (EDT)
- ZIP code: 21850
- Area codes: 410, 443
- FIPS code: 24-62025
- GNIS feature ID: 0591023
- Website: pittsvillemd.gov

Pittsville is a town in Wicomico County, Maryland, United States. As of the 2020 census, Pittsville had a population of 1,636. It is included in the Salisbury, Maryland-Delaware Metropolitan Statistical Area. It was named for Dr. Hillary R. Pitts, president of the Worcester & Pocomoke Railroad ca 1868-1870.

== Geography ==
Pittsville is located at 38°23′41″N 75°24′33″W.

According to the United States Census Bureau, the town has a total area of 1.68 square miles (4.35 km^{2}), all land.

Pittsville played the part of the backwater Iowa town in the 1974 made-for-TV movie The Rimers of Eldritch starring Rue McClanahan and Susan Sarandon.

== Demographics ==
Historical population
Census	Pop.	Note	%±
1910	300		—
1920	368		22.7%
1930	436		18.5%
1950	497		—
1960	488		−1.8%
1970	477		−2.3%
1980	519		8.8%
1990	602		16.0%
2000	1,182		96.3%
2010	1,417		19.9%
2020	1,636		15.5%
U.S. Decennial Census

=== 2020 census ===
As of the 2020 census, Pittsville had a population of 1,636. The median age was 40.2 years. 22.8% of residents were under the age of 18 and 16.2% of residents were 65 years of age or older. For every 100 females there were 98.8 males, and for every 100 females age 18 and over there were 92.2 males age 18 and over.

0.0% of residents lived in urban areas, while 100.0% lived in rural areas.

There were 667 households in Pittsville, of which 34.0% had children under the age of 18 living in them. Of all households, 39.3% were married-couple households, 19.5% were households with a male householder and no spouse or partner present, and 32.1% were households with a female householder and no spouse or partner present. About 25.5% of all households were made up of individuals and 11.1% had someone living alone who was 65 years of age or older.

There were 729 housing units, of which 8.5% were vacant. The homeowner vacancy rate was 2.2% and the rental vacancy rate was 4.1%.

Racial composition as of the 2020 census
Race	Number	Percent
White	1,353	82.7%
Black or African American	108	6.6%
American Indian and Alaska Native	5	0.3%
Asian	23	1.4%
Native Hawaiian and Other Pacific Islander	1	0.1%
Some other race	43	2.6%
Two or more races	103	6.3%
Hispanic or Latino (of any race)	77	4.7%

=== 2010 census ===
As of the census of 2010, there were 1,417 people, 591 households, and 382 families living in the town. The population density was 843.5 inhabitants per square mile (325.7/km^{2}). There were 668 housing units at an average density of 397.6 per square mile (153.5/km^{2}). The racial makeup of the town was 90.3% White, 4.8% African American, 0.1% Native American, 1.6% Asian, 0.6% from other races, and 2.6% from two or more races. Hispanic or Latino of any race were 1.9% of the population.

There were 591 households, of which 33.5% had children under the age of 18 living with them, 45.3% were married couples living together, 14.6% had a female householder with no husband present, 4.7% had a male householder with no wife present, and 35.4% were non-families. 28.3% of all households were made up of individuals, and 9.7% had someone living alone who was 65 years of age or older. The average household size was 2.40 and the average family size was 2.93.

The median age in the town was 39.1 years. 23.4% of residents were under the age of 18; 7.8% were between the ages of 18 and 24; 27.4% were from 25 to 44; 28.9% were from 45 to 64; and 12.6% were 65 years of age or older. The gender makeup of the town was 47.6% male and 52.4% female.

=== 2000 census ===
As of the census of 2000, there were 1,182 people, 477 households, and 321 families living in the town. The population density was 677.3 inhabitants per square mile (261.5/km^{2}). There were 506 housing units at an average density of 289.9 per square mile (111.9/km^{2}). The racial makeup of the town was 87.56% White, 6.60% African American, 0.17% Native American, 3.89% Asian, 0.08% from other races, and 1.69% from two or more races. Hispanic or Latino of any race were 1.61% of the population.

There were 477 households, out of which 36.7% had children under the age of 18 living with them, 45.7% were married couples living together, 16.1% had a female householder with no husband present, and 32.5% were non-families. 26.6% of all households were made up of individuals, and 8.2% had someone living alone who was 65 years of age or older. The average household size was 2.48 and the average family size was 2.93.

In the town, the population was spread out, with 26.8% under the age of 18, 9.6% from 18 to 24, 34.1% from 25 to 44, 20.5% from 45 to 64, and 9.0% who were 65 years of age or older. The median age was 32 years. For every 100 females, there were 88.5 males. For every 100 females age 18 and over, there were 84.0 males.

The median income for a household in the town was $32,500, and the median income for a family was $39,375. Males had a median income of $31,141 versus $20,759 for females. The per capita income for the town was $15,966. About 8.3% of families and 9.3% of the population were below the poverty line, including 9.7% of those under age 18 and 8.2% of those age 65 or over.
