= Parsonsburg, Maryland =

Parsonsburg
- Census-designated place
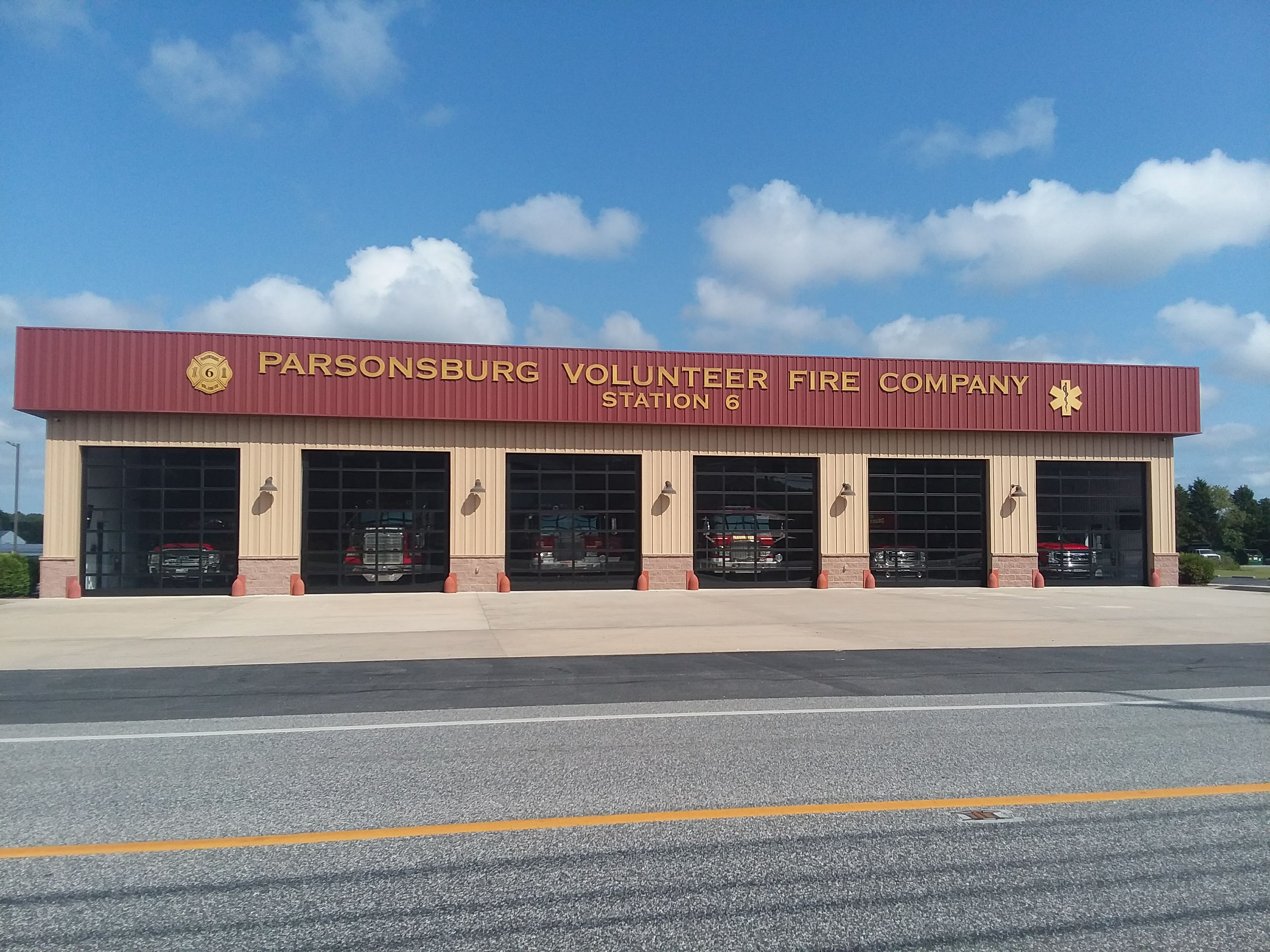
- Parsonsburg Fire Department

- Location within the state of Maryland Parsonsburg (the United States)
- Coordinates: 38°23′15″N 75°28′16″W
- Country: United States
- State: Maryland
- County: Wicomico

Area
  - Total: 1.31 sq mi (3.39 km^{2})
  - Land: 1.31 sq mi (3.39 km^{2})
  - Water: 0 sq mi (0.00 km^{2})
- Elevation: 85 ft (26 m)

Population (2020)
  - Total: 319
  - Density: 244.0/sq mi (94.22/km^{2})
- Time zone: UTC−5 (Eastern (EST))
  - Summer (DST): UTC−4 (EDT)
- ZIP Code: 21849
- Area codes: 410 & 443
- FIPS code: 24-60425
- GNIS feature ID: 586426

Parsonsburg is an unincorporated community and census-designated place in Wicomico County, Maryland, United States. Its population is one of the smallest in America, it was 339 as of the 2010 census. It is part of the Salisbury, Maryland-Delaware Metropolitan Statistical Area.

== Demographics ==
Historical population
Census	Pop.	Note	%±
2020	319		—
U.S. Decennial Census

== Climate ==
The climate in this area is characterized by hot, humid summers and generally mild to cool winters. According to the Köppen climate classification system, Parsonsburg has a humid subtropical climate, abbreviated "Cfa" on climate maps.

== Notable person ==
- Maulana Karenga, known as Ron Karenga, an African American activist, author and professor of Africana studies who created the pan-African and African-American holiday of Kwanzaa.
