= Powellville, Maryland =

Powellville
- Census-designated place
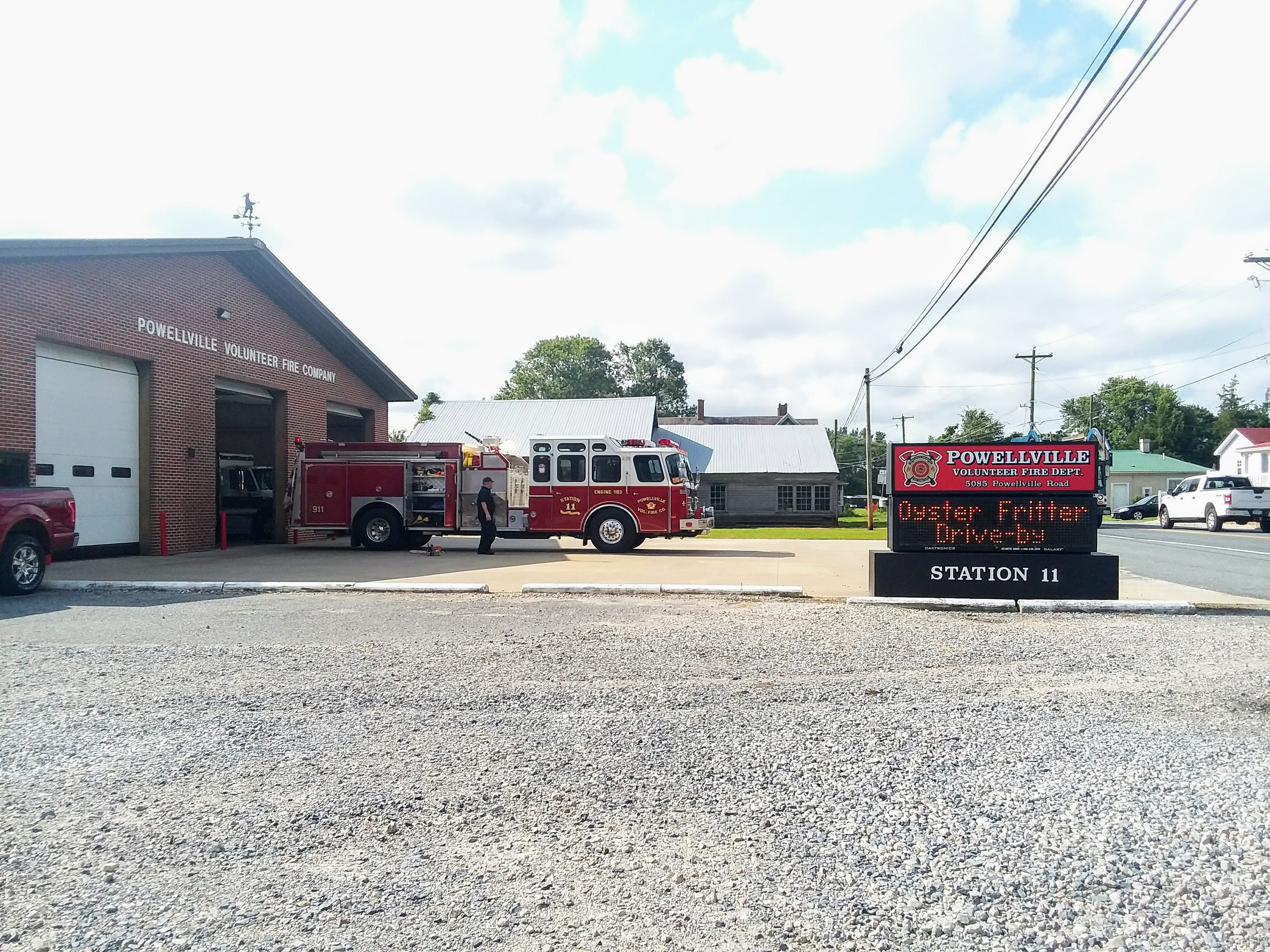
- Powellville Fire Department

- Location within the state of Maryland Powellville (the United States)
- Coordinates: 38°19′43″N 75°22′32″W
- Country: United States
- State: Maryland
- County: Wicomico

Area
  - Total: 1.59 sq mi (4.11 km^{2})
  - Land: 1.58 sq mi (4.08 km^{2})
  - Water: 0.012 sq mi (0.03 km^{2})
- Elevation: 30 ft (9.1 m)

Population (2020)
  - Total: 188
  - Density: 119.4/sq mi (46.11/km^{2})
- Time zone: UTC−5 (Eastern (EST))
  - Summer (DST): UTC−4 (EDT)
- ZIP code: 21852
- Area codes: 410 & 443
- FIPS code: 24-63725
- GNIS feature ID: 591066

Powellville is an unincorporated community and census-designated place in Wicomico County, Maryland, United States. Its population was 189 as of the 2010 census. It is part of the Salisbury, Maryland-Delaware Metropolitan Statistical Area.

== Demographics ==
Historical population
Census	Pop.	Note	%±
2020	188		—
U.S. Decennial Census
