= Willards, Maryland =

- Town
- Location of Willards, Maryland
- Coordinates: 38°23′24″N 75°21′1″W
- Country: United States
- State: Maryland
- County: Wicomico
- Incorporated: 1906

Area
  - Total: 1.15 sq mi (2.97 km^{2})
  - Land: 1.14 sq mi (2.95 km^{2})
  - Water: 0.0077 sq mi (0.02 km^{2})
- Elevation: 33 ft (10 m)

Population (2020)
  - Total: 963
  - Density: 846.8/sq mi (326.96/km^{2})
- Time zone: UTC-5 (Eastern (EST))
  - Summer (DST): UTC-4 (EDT)
- ZIP code: 21874
- Area codes: 410, 443
- FIPS code: 24-84950
- GNIS feature ID: 0591557

Willards is a town in Wicomico County, Maryland, United States. As of the 2020 census, Willards had a population of 963. It is included in the Salisbury, Maryland-Delaware Metropolitan Statistical Area.

== Geography ==
Willards is located at 38°23′24″N 75°21′1″W (38.389927, -75.350254), roughly halfway between Ocean City and Salisbury.

According to the United States Census Bureau, the town has a total area of 1.07 square miles (2.77 km^{2}), all land.

== Demographics ==
Historical population
| Census | Pop. | Note | %± |
|---|---|---|---|
| 1930 | 217 | | — |
| 1940 | 285 | | 31.3% |
| 1950 | 464 | | 62.8% |
| 1960 | 531 | | 14.4% |
| 1970 | 494 | | −7.0% |
| 1980 | 540 | | 9.3% |
| 1990 | 708 | | 31.1% |
| 2000 | 938 | | 32.5% |
| 2010 | 958 | | 2.1% |
| 2020 | 963 | | 0.5% |
U.S. Decennial Census

=== 2010 census ===
As of the census of 2010, there were 958 people, 356 households, and 256 families living in the town. The population density was 895.3 inhabitants per square mile (345.7/km^{2}). There were 398 housing units at an average density of 372.0 per square mile (143.6/km^{2}). The racial makeup of the town was 87.7% White, 8.8% African American, 0.5% Native American, 0.7% Asian, 0.1% from other races, and 2.2% from two or more races. Hispanic or Latino of any race were 3.5% of the population.

There were 356 households, of which 43.3% had children under the age of 18 living with them, 45.5% were married couples living together, 18.8% had a female householder with no husband present, 7.6% had a male householder with no wife present, and 28.1% were non-families. 22.5% of all households were made up of individuals, and 7.3% had someone living alone who was 65 years of age or older. The average household size was 2.69 and the average family size was 3.13.

The median age in the town was 32.6 years. 28.3% of residents were under the age of 18; 9.4% were between the ages of 18 and 24; 28.9% were from 25 to 44; 24.7% were from 45 to 64; and 8.7% were 65 years of age or older. The gender makeup of the town was 49.1% male and 50.9% female.

=== 2000 census ===
As of the census of 2000, there were 938 people, 364 households, and 259 families living in the town. The population density was 978.3 inhabitants per square mile (377.7/km^{2}). There were 386 housing units at an average density of 402.6 per square mile (155.4/km^{2}). The racial makeup of the town was 88.91% White, 6.29% African American, 2.99% Asian, 0.96% from other races, and 0.85% from two or more races. Hispanic or Latino of any race were 2.77% of the population.

There were 364 households, out of which 39.0% had children under the age of 18 living with them, 48.9% were married couples living together, 15.9% had a female householder with no husband present, and 28.6% were non-families. 22.5% of all households were made up of individuals, and 11.5% had someone living alone who was 65 years of age or older. The average household size was 2.58 and the average family size was 2.94.

In the town, the population was spread out, with 29.0% under the age of 18, 9.4% from 18 to 24, 32.0% from 25 to 44, 17.5% from 45 to 64, and 12.2% who were 65 years of age or older. The median age was 32 years. For every 100 females, there were 95.4 males. For every 100 females age 18 and over, there were 91.9 males.

The median income for a household in the town was $32,059, and the median income for a family was $32,625. Males had a median income of $29,643 versus $18,500 for females. The per capita income for the town was $12,745. About 9.2% of families and 9.9% of the population were below the poverty line, including 14.7% of those under age 18 and 8.6% of those age 65 or over.
