= List of former Maryland state highways (200–399) =

Highway names
- Interstates: Interstate X (I-X)
- US Highways: U.S. Route X (US X)
- State: Maryland Route X (MD X)
- Former state highways: 2–199; 200–399; 400–499; 500–599; 600–699; 700–999

System links
- Maryland highway system; Interstate; US; State; Scenic Byways

The Maryland highway system has several hundred former state highways. These highways were constructed, maintained, or funded by the Maryland State Roads Commission or Maryland State Highway Administration and assigned a unique or temporally unique number. Some time after the highway was assigned, the highway was transferred to county or municipal maintenance and the number designation was removed from the particular stretch of road. In some cases, a highway was renumbered in whole or in part. This list contains all or most of the state-numbered highways between 200 and 399 that have existed since highways were first numbered in 1927 but are no longer part of the state highway system or are state highways of a different number. Most former state highways have not had their numbers reused. However, many state highway numbers were used for a former highway and are currently in use. Some numbers have been used three times. The former highways below whose numbers are used presently, those that were taken over in whole or in part by another highway, or have enough information to warrant a separate article contain links to those separate highway articles. Highway numbers that have two or more former uses are differentiated below by year ranges. This list does not include former Interstate or U.S. Highways, which are linked from their respective lists.

== MD 200 ==
Maryland Route 200
- Location: Coral Hills–Capitol Heights
- Existed: 1927–1955

Maryland Route 200 was the designation for Larchmont Avenue from MD 4 (now Marlboro Pike) in Coral Hills north to MD 214 (now MD 332) in Capitol Heights in central Prince George's County. The highway, which was then known as Crystal Spring Avenue, was constructed as a 16-foot-wide (4.9 m) gravel road between 1924 and 1926. MD 200 was widened and resurfaced in 1948. The highway was resurfaced again in 1954, then removed from the state highway system in 1955.

== MD 203 ==
Maryland Route 203
- Location: College Park
- Existed: 1928–1957

Maryland Route 203 was the designation for College Avenue from US 1 east to Dartmouth Avenue, Dartmouth Avenue south to Calvert Road, and Calvert Road east to the Baltimore & Ohio Railroad within College Park in northern Prince George's County. The highway was paved as a 16-foot-wide (4.9 m) concrete road in 1928. The College Avenue portion of MD 203 was widened to 36 feet (11 m) between 1938 and 1940. MD 203 was resurfaced in 1957 and was removed from the state highway system that same year.

== MD 204 ==
Maryland Route 204
- Location: Takoma Park–Chillum
- Existed: 1928–1955

Maryland Route 204 was the designation for Poplar Street and Ray Road from the Takoma Park town limit east to MD 212 in Chillum in northern Prince George's County. The highway was constructed as a concrete road from the Takoma Park town limit east of Spring Avenue to a point east of what is now MD 650, which did not yet exist, in 1928. MD 204 was extended east to MD 212 in 1929. The route was removed from the state highway system in 1955.

== MD 205 (1927–1956) ==
Maryland Route 205
- Location: Bladensburg–Greenbelt
- Existed: 1927–1956

Maryland Route 205 was the designation for Edmonston Road from US 50 (now MD 450) in Bladensburg north to MD 430 (now MD 193) in Greenbelt in northern Prince George's County. The portion of the highway from Bladensburg to Riverdale was completed by 1927. In 1956, MD 205 was replaced with a northward extension of MD 201, whose northern terminus had been very close to MD 205's southern terminus in Bladensburg. The portion of Edmonston Road that was bypassed by the new MD 201 four-lane divided highway in Bladensburg became MD 769.

== MD 205 (1989–1997) ==
Maryland Route 205
- Location: Waldorf
- Existed: 1989–1997

MD 205 was the designation for Mattawoman–Beantown Road from MD 5 north to US 301/MD 5 just south of Mattawoman Creek in Waldorf in northern Charles County. The southernmost portion of what became MD 205 was constructed as a gravel road along Poplar Hill Road by 1927. This road was designated part of MD 233. In 1956, MD 382 was extended west into Charles County along part of what had been MD 233 to MD 5 at Beantown. MD 382 was removed from Charles County in 1989. That same year, MD 205 was assigned to the westernmost portion of Poplar Hill Road in Beantown and north along two-lane Mattawoman–Beantown Road to US 301 and MD 5 at Mattawoman. The route was expanded to a four-lane divided highway and was taken over as MD 5's bypass of Waldorf in 1997. The portion of MD 5 from what had been MD 205's southern terminus west to US 301 became MD 5 Business.

== MD 206 ==
Maryland Route 206
- Location: Cottage City–Brentwood
- Existed: 1927–1970

Maryland Route 206 was the designation for 38th Street from US 1 Alternate in Cottage City north to US 1 in Brentwood in northern Prince George's County. The highway was paved as a concrete road by Prince George's County with state aid from Bladensburg Road to what is now Rhode Island Avenue in Brentwood, then southwest along Rhode Island Avenue to the District of Columbia boundary in Mount Rainier between 1916 and 1919. By 1946, the portion of MD 206 along Rhode Island Avenue and MD 411—which had followed Rhode Island Avenue from 38th Street to US 1 in Hyattsville—were replaced by US 1. MD 208 was removed from Mount Rainier and relocated to its present course north of US 1 in 1960. That highway was extended south over the course of MD 206 in 1970.

== MD 207 ==
Maryland Route 207
- Location: Cottage City
- Existed: 1927–c. 1970

Maryland Route 207 was the designation for Pennwood Road and Cottage Terrace in Cottage City from Route 206 northeast to Bunker Hill Road. Decommissioning date is unknown.

== MD 209 ==
Maryland Route 209
- Location: Chillum–Hyattsville
- Existed: 1927–c. 1946

Maryland Route 209 was the designation for Ager Road and Hamilton Street from MD 212 in Chillum east to Hyattsville in northern Prince George's County. The highway was paved as a concrete road from 38th Street to 40th Street at the Hyattsville town limit by 1921. The remainder of Hamilton Street and Ager Road west of Hamilton Street to Riggs Road were paved by 1923. MD 209 was replaced by an eastward extension of MD 410 by 1946. In 1956, MD 410 was moved to its current divided highway through Hyattsville; what had been MD 209 is now county highway except for a small part of MD 410 east of MD 212 and the portion of Hamilton Street that is part of MD 208.

== MD 210 ==
Maryland Route 210
- Location: Chillum–Hyattsville
- Existed: 1927–c. 1946

Maryland Route 210 was the designation for Queens Chapel Road from the District of Columbia boundary in Chillum north to MD 209 at the intersection of Ager Road and Hamilton Street in Hyattsville in northern Prince George's County. The highway was paved as a 14-foot-wide (4.3 m) concrete road by Prince George's County with state aid by 1915. MD 210 was replaced with a southern extension of MD 500 by 1946.

== MD 211 ==
Maryland Route 211
- Location: Chillum
- Existed: 1927–1997

Maryland Route 211 was the designation for Sargent Road from the District of Columbia boundary north to MD 212 within Chillum in northern Prince George's County. The highway was paved as a concrete road by Prince George's County with state aid between 1916 and 1919. MD 211 was removed from the state highway system in 1997.

== MD 215 ==
Maryland Route 215
- Location: Elkridge
- Existed: 1927–1956

Maryland Route 215 was the designation for Lawyers Hill Road and Levering Avenue from MD 103, which then followed Montgomery Road, north and east to US 1 in Elkridge in eastern Howard County. The highway was constructed as a 9-foot-wide (2.7 m) concrete road by Howard County with state aid from Montgomery Road to the Baltimore and Ohio Railroad by 1915. The highway was resurfaced with macadam and Levering Avenue was paved as a macadam road by 1927. MD 215 was removed from the state highway system in 1956.

== MD 217 ==
Maryland Route 217
- Location: Elkridge
- Existed: 1927–1956

Maryland Route 217 was the designation for Landing Road from MD 103, which then followed Montgomery Road, north to near former MD 104, which followed Ilchester Road, near Elkridge in eastern Howard County. The highway was constructed as a gravel road between 1924 and 1926. MD 217 was removed from the state highway system in 1956.

== MD 221 ==
Maryland Route 221
- Location: Largo–Upper Marlboro
- Existed: 1927–1955

Maryland Route 221 was the designation for Ritchie Road from MD 214 near Largo south to near District Heights and Ritchie–Marlboro Road from Ritchie Road east to MD 4 (Marlboro Pike) west of Upper Marlboro in central Prince George's County. Ritchie Road from Largo south to MD 4 (Marlboro Pike) in Forestville was built as a gravel road in 1923. Ritchie–Marlboro Road was constructed as a gravel road in 1933. The southern portion of Ritchie Road was designated MD 534. MD 221 and MD 534 were removed from the state highway system in 1955.

== MD 226 ==
Maryland Route 226
- Location: Bryans Road–Marshall Hall
- Existed: 1927–1956

Maryland Route 226 was the designation for Marshall Hall Road from MD 224 at Bryans Road north to the Potomac River at Marshall Hall in northwestern Charles County. The highway was constructed as a gravel road by 1927. MD 226 was replaced by an extension of MD 227 north from Pomonkey in 1956.

== MD 229 ==
Maryland Route 229
- Location: Morgantown–Wayside
- Existed: 1927–1956

Maryland Route 229 was the designation for Morgantown Road from Morgantown on the Potomac River east to MD 3 (now MD 257) at Wayside in southern Charles County. The portion of the highway closest to Wayside was built as a 9-foot-wide (2.7 m) gravel road by Charles County with state aid by 1915. The remainder of the highway to Morgantown was completed by 1921. MD 229 served as the terminus of a ferry between Morgantown and Colonial Beach, Virginia, beginning in or shortly before 1933. The ferry was discontinued between 1940 and 1946 following completion of the Potomac River Bridge between Newburg and Dahlgren, Virginia, in 1940. MD 229 was removed from the state highway system in 1956.

== MD 230 ==
Maryland Route 230
- Location: Newburg–Mount Victoria
- Existed: 1927–1956

Maryland Route 230 was the designation for Mount Victoria Road from MD 3 (now MD 257) in Newburg east to Hatton Road at Mount Victoria in southern Charles County. The highway was constructed as a 15-foot-wide (4.6 m) gravel road for 2 miles (3.2 km) east from Newburg in 1926 and 1927. MD 230 was extended to Mount Victoria in 1928. The highway was removed from the state highway system in 1956.

== MD 232 ==
Maryland Route 232
- Location: Wicomico–Waldorf
- Existed: 1927–1989

Maryland Route 232 was the designation for Trinity Church Road, Olivers Shop Road, Bryantown Road, and Dr. Samuel Mudd Road from MD 234 at Wicomico north to MD 382 near Waldorf via Dentsville and Bryantown in eastern Charles County. The first section of the highway was built as a gravel road along Olivers Shop Road from what became MD 5 in Bryantown south halfway to the future western terminus of MD 231 at Burnt Store by 1921. The next section of MD 232 was built as part of MD 233; the gravel road improvement of Dr. Samuel Mudd Road north of Bryantown was completed in 1928. That same year, another section of gravel road that was started in 1926 was constructed from MD 6 at Dentsville south along Trinity Church Road to Ryceville about midway between Dentsville and Bryantown. Reconstruction of Olivers Shop Road and Trinity Church Road were completed in 1929 and 1930, respectively. Bryantown Road was gravelled from MD 5 toward Dr. Samuel Mudd Road in three sections that were completed in 1933, 1935, and 1936. When MD 233 was removed from the state highway system in 1956, MD 232 was extended north along Dr. Samuel Mudd Road to MD 382, which was assigned to another section of MD 233 west to Waldorf. All of MD 232 was removed from the state highway system in 1989.

== MD 233 ==
Maryland Route 233
- Location: Waldorf–Aquasco
- Existed: 1927–1956

Maryland Route 233 was the designation for Poplar Hill Road, Dr. Samuel Mudd Road, and Woodville Road from MD 5 near Waldorf east to the Charles–Prince George's county line at County Line Creek near Aquasco via Gallant Green and Malcolm. MD 233 was built as a gravel road from Beantown southeast of Waldorf at the modern intersection of MD 5 and MD 5 Business east along Poplar Hill Road to a point west of Zekiah Swamp in 1926 and 1927. The highway was extended east to Dr. Samuel Mudd Road, then continued along that road to Bryantown Road, which became MD 232, in 1928. MD 233 was completed to the Washington, Brandywine and Point Lookout Railroad (now the Herbert Subdivision of CSX's Popes Creek Subdivision railroad line) at Gallant Green in 1929. The highway was extended to County Line Creek west of Aquasco in two sections between 1930 and 1933. MD 233 was removed from the state highway system in 1956. The Poplar Hill Road portion of the highway became part of MD 382 and Dr. Samuel Mudd Road became the northern end of MD 232.

== MD 237 ==
Maryland Route 237
- Location: Chaptico–Leonardtown
- Existed: 1927–1961

Maryland Route 237 was the designation for Budds Creek Road from MD 234 and MD 238 at Chaptico east to MD 5 near Leonardtown in western St. Mary's County. The highway was partially completed as a gravel road by 1927. MD 237 was replaced by an eastward extension of MD 234 in 1961. MD 234 had followed what is now MD 238 from Chaptico to MD 5 at Helen.

== MD 241 ==
Maryland Route 241
- Location: Avenue–Abell
- Existed: 1928–1956

Maryland Route 241 was the designation for Abell Road from MD 242 and MD 470 at Avenue east to Abell in western St. Mary's County. The highway was constructed as a gravel road in 1928. MD 241 was removed from the state highway system in 1956.

== MD 248 ==
Maryland Route 248
- Location: Lexington Park
- Existed: 1927–1943

Maryland Route 248 was the designation for Cedar Point Road, which extended from MD 246 near Jarboesville east toward the Cedar Point peninsula in eastern St. Mary's County. Much of the highway was constructed as a 15-foot-wide (4.6 m) gravel road in 1925 and 1926. MD 248 was extended to its eastern terminus between 1930 and 1933. Starting in 1943, Cedar Point Naval Air Station (now Naval Air Station Patuxent River) was constructed on the Cedar Point peninsula. MD 248 was removed from the state highway system as all of the highway was within the area taken by the federal government for the military base.

== MD 250 ==
Maryland Route 250
- Location: Valley Lee
- Existed: 1927–c. 1946

Maryland Route 250 was the designation for Medleys Neck Road and Blakes Creek Road from west of Valley Lee to MD 249 at Valley Lee in southern St. Mary's County. The first segment of MD 250 was constructed as a gravel road by 1927. MD 250 was replaced by an eastward extension of MD 244 by 1946.

== MD 251 ==
Maryland Route 251
- Location: Valley Lee–Drayden
- Existed: 1928–c. 1946

Maryland Route 251 was the designation for Drayden Road from MD 249 at Valley Lee east to east of Drayden in southern St. Mary's County. The highway was constructed as a gravel road from MD 249 east to Cherryfield Road in Drayden in 1928. MD 251 was extended east to near Porto Bello in 1930. MD 251 was replaced with an eastward extension of MD 244 by 1946. The Drayden Road portion of MD 244 was removed from the state highway system in 1987.

== MD 252 ==
Maryland Route 252
- Location: Ridge
- Existed: 1927–1983

Maryland Route 252 was the designation for Wynne Road from Millers Wharf Road east to MD 5 at Ridge in southern St. Mary's County. The first section of the highway was built from MD 5 west about halfway to Millers Wharf Road in 1926 and 1927. MD 252 was completed to Millers Wharf Road in 1928. The route was removed from the state highway system in 1983.

== MD 254 ==
Maryland Route 254
- Location: Davidsonville–Edgewater
- Existed: 1927–c. 1939

Maryland Route 254 was the designation for Davidsonville Road from MD 424 in Davidsonville east to MD 2 in Edgewater in central Anne Arundel County. The highway was constructed as a gravel road from MD 2 to Riva Road by 1921 and to Davidsonville by 1927. In 1935, Central Avenue was completed between MD 3 (now US 301) in Prince George's County east to Davidsonville. By 1939, MD 214 was extended east from MD 3 to MD 2, taking over the course of MD 254.

== MD 257 ==
Maryland Route 257
- Location: Deale
- Existed: 1927–c. 1939

Maryland Route 257 was the designation of the highway from MD 256 west to MD 2. The first segment of MD 257 was constructed as a 15-foot (4.6 m) wide gravel road from MD 2 east to the hamlet of Nutwell west of Deale, near the intersection with Franklin Gibson Road in 1923. MD 257 extended east to MD 256 by 1933. MD 257 became part of an extended MD 256 by 1957.

== MD 266 ==
Maryland Route 266
- Location: Lusby
- Existed: 1928–1957

Maryland Route 266 was the designation for Sollers Wharf Road, which ran from Sollers at the mouth of St. Leonard Creek east to MD 2 (now MD 765) in Lusby in southern Calvert County. The highway was constructed as a gravel road from MD 2 west to Mill Bridge Road in 1928. MD 266 was completed to Sollers in 1929. The route was removed from the state highway system in 1957.

== MD 268 ==
Maryland Route 268
- Location: Perryville–Conowingo
- Length: 11.68 mi (18.80 km)
- Existed: 1927–1938

Maryland Route 268 was the designation for the Port Deposit Road, which ran 11.68 miles (18.80 km) from US 40 (now MD 7) in Perryville north to US 1 at Conowingo in western Cecil County. The first stretch of the highway to be improved was in Perryville, where Cecil County constructed with state aid a macadam road from the Aikin station on the Baltimore and Ohio Railroad south toward the Post Road by 1910. Cecil County extended the macadam road to the Post Road by 1919. The highway from the Aikin railroad crossing to Port Deposit was paved as a 15-foot-long (4.6 m) concrete road in two sections: from the railroad to near Port Deposit by 1921 and through Port Deposit by 1923. MD 268 was paved as a concrete road from Port Deposit to US 1 at Conowingo Dam between 1930 and 1933; the construction work included repurposing a railroad bridge across Octoraro Creek as a highway bridge. MD 268's bridge across the Baltimore & Ohio Railroad was constructed between 1931 and 1934. The old highway approaching the Aikin grade crossing became MD 449. MD 268 was replaced by a southern extension of US 222 (now MD 222) in 1938.

== MD 269 ==
Maryland Route 269
- Location: Port Deposit–Colora
- Length: 6.40 mi (10.30 km)
- Existed: 1927–1984

Maryland Route 269 was the designation for Liberty Grove Road, which ran 6.40 miles (10.30 km) from US 222 (now MD 222) in Port Deposit north through Liberty Grove and east to Harrisville Road (former MD 813A) near Colora. The first section of what became MD 269 to be constructed was from Harrisville Road to Hopewell Road, which was constructed as a macadam road by Cecil County with state aid by 1910. The highway from Port Deposit to Liberty Grove was constructed starting in 1916 and was mostly complete by 1920. The 14-foot-wide (4.3 m) concrete road featured a gap near Dr. Jack Road; that gap was filled by a macadam road by 1927. The remainder of the highway from Liberty Grove through Colora to Harrisville Road was under construction in 1930 and completed by 1933.

The 0.68-mile-long (1.09 km) portion of MD 269 between Harrisville Road and Hopewell Road was transferred from state to county maintenance through a May 8, 1958, road transfer agreement. In that same agreement, MD 276 was moved from Hopewell Road to Harrisville Road, which was then known as Kelly Road, so MD 269's eastern terminus remained at MD 276. Harrisville Road later became MD 813A after MD 276's present course was completed north of Liberty Grove Road in 1964. MD 813A was transferred from state to county control in a December 27, 1979, road transfer agreement. Thus, MD 269's eastern terminus was at a county highway until the highway from Port Deposit to Harrisville Road was transferred from state to county maintenance when the road transfer agreement of May 16, 1984, was executed the following month.

== MD 271 ==
Maryland Route 271
- Location: Perryville
- Length: 0.33 mi (530 m)
- Existed: 1930–1968

Maryland Route 271 was the designation for the 0.33-mile-long (0.53 km) state-maintained portion of Susquehanna Avenue that ran from MD 7 to north of Locust Street within Perryville in western Cecil County. The street was paved as a macadam road between 1928 and 1930. MD 271 was transferred from state to town maintenance after the completion of MD 327 on the east side of Perryville in 1968; the transfer was effected through a March 8, 1967, agreement between the town and the Maryland State Roads Commission.

== MD 275 ==
Maryland Route 275
- Location: Kingstown
- Existed: 1927–c. 1946

Maryland Route 275 was the designation for the road from MD 213 west via Old Bridge Rd. This was cancelled in 1946.

== MD 278 ==
Maryland Route 278
- Location: Northeastern Cecil County
- Length: 0.21 mi (340 m)
- Existed: 1927–c. 1946

Maryland Route 278 was the designation for Mechanicsville Road, which ran 0.21 miles (0.34 km) from the Delaware state line west and north to the Pennsylvania state line in far northeastern Cecil County. The highway was constructed as a 15-foot-wide (4.6 m) concrete road in 1925 as Maryland's very short portion of the highway between Newark and the Lincoln Highway near Lancaster. MD 278's designation was changed to MD 896 between 1940 and 1946. The Delaware and Pennsylvania connecting highways had been numbered Delaware Route 896 and Pennsylvania Route 896, respectively, by 1938.

== MD 280 ==
Maryland Route 280
- Location: Elkton–Fair Hill
- Length: 9.40 mi (15.13 km)
- Existed: 1927–1971

Maryland Route 280 was the 9.40-mile-long (15.13 km) designation for Bridge Street, Singerly Road, and Lewisville Road from US 40 and US 213 in Elkton north to the Pennsylvania state line near Fair Hill in eastern Cecil County. In 1927, US 40 was assigned to Main Street, US 213 was assigned to Bridge Street south of US 40 in Elkton, and MD 280 was assigned to the highway north of US 40. When US 40 was moved to the four-lane divided Pulaski Highway in 1941, US 213's northern terminus was retracted from Main Street to the new US 40 and MD 280 was extended south from Main Street to that same intersection. When the American Association of State Highway Officials approved removing the US 213 designation from Wye Mills to Elkton at their December 1971 annual meeting, both the U.S. Highway and MD 280 were replaced by MD 213.

The highways from Elkton to Fair Hill and from Elkton toward Chesapeake City were included in the original state road system designed by the Maryland State Roads Commission in 1909. The portion of the highway from the north town limit of Elkton to the Baltimore & Ohio Railroad (now CSX's Philadelphia Subdivision) crossing at Singerly was constructed as a 14-foot-wide (4.3 m) macadam road in 1911. The highway from the south town limit of Elkton at Big Elk Creek toward Chesapeake City was started in 1911 and completed as a 14-foot-wide (4.3 m) macadam road in 1914. Bridge Street in the town of Elkton was paved as a 17-foot-wide (5.2 m) concrete road in 1920 and 1921. By 1923, 2 miles (3.2 km) of 15-foot-wide (4.6 m) concrete road was added north from Singerly. The remainder of the highway to Fair Hill was completed as a concrete road in 1923 and 1924. In 1924 and 1925, Bridge Street in Elkton was reconstructed. The highway from Fair Hill to the Pennsylvania state line was constructed as a concrete road between 1930 and 1933. MD 280 received two railroad grade separations in the 1930s. The route's bridge across the Pennsylvania Railroad (now Amtrak's Northeast Corridor) in Elkton was constructed between 1930 and 1934. The highway's bridge across the Baltimore & Ohio Railroad at Singerly was constructed between 1937 and 1939. MD 280 was reconstructed from Elkton to Fair Hill between 1956 and 1958. The highway was relocated north of Singerly; the bypassed section, Cherry Hill Road, became MD 812.

== MD 283 ==
Maryland Route 283
- Location: Crystal Beach–Earleville
- Length: 4.46 mi (7.18 km)
- Existed: 1928–1958

Maryland Route 283 was the designation for Crystal Beach Road, which ran 4.46 miles (7.18 km) from Crystal Beach east to MD 282 in Earleville in southern Cecil County. The first segment of the highway was completed through Earleville in 1928. MD 283 was extended west to Crystal Beach as a concrete road in two segments. The first segment was started in 1930 and completed by 1933, and the second segment was completed in 1934. The highway was fully incorporated into MD 282 after the portion of MD 282 on Grove Neck Road west of Earleville was transferred to county maintenance through a May 8, 1958, road transfer agreement.

== MD 293 ==
Maryland Route 293
- Location: Betterton
- Length: 0.63 mi (1,010 m)
- Existed: 1930–1987

Maryland Route 293 was the designation for Ericsson Avenue, which ran 0.63 miles (1.01 km) from Howell Point Road north to MD 292 (Main Street) within the town of Betterton in northern Kent County. The highway was built as a concrete road in 1930. MD 293 was one of several highways constructed by the Maryland State Roads Commission as 9-foot (2.7 m) or 16-foot-wide (4.9 m) concrete roads through a $900,000 Kent County bond issue in 1929 and 1930. MD 293 and its auxiliary routes were resurfaced with bituminous concrete in 1976 and were transferred from state to county maintenance through a December 1, 1987, road transfer agreement.

MD 293 had three auxiliary routes. All three of these highways were also constructed in 1930 and became county maintained in 1988. They each started with different route numbers; however, all three highways became auxiliary routes of MD 293 between 1946 and 1952, likely in 1948.

- MD 293A was the designation for First Avenue, which ran 0.25 miles (0.40 km) east from MD 292 to the end of state maintenance. MD 293A was previously MD 296.
- MD 293B was the designation for School Street (now Howell Point Road), which ran 0.14 miles (0.23 km) from MD 293 east to MD 292. MD 293B was previously MD 295.
- MD 293C was the designation for Wheeler Avenue, which ran 0.16 miles (0.26 km) from MD 293 east to MD 292. MD 293C was previously MD 294.

== MD 294 ==
Maryland Route 294
- Location: Betterton
- Length: 0.16 mi (260 m)
- Existed: 1930–c. 1948

Maryland Route 294 was the designation for Wheeler Avenue, which ran 0.16 miles (0.26 km) from MD 293 (Ericsson Avenue) east to MD 292 (Main Street) within the town of Betterton in northern Kent County. The highway was built as a concrete road in 1930. MD 294 was one of several highways constructed by the Maryland State Roads Commission as 9-foot (2.7 m) or 16-foot-wide (4.9 m) concrete roads through a $900,000 Kent County bond issue in 1929 and 1930. MD 294 was renumbered MD 293C between 1946 and 1952, likely in 1948.

== MD 295 ==
Maryland Route 295
- Location: Betterton
- Length: 0.14 mi (230 m)
- Existed: 1930–c. 1948

Maryland Route 295 was the designation for School Street (now Howell Point Road), which ran 0.14 miles (0.23 km) from MD 293 (Ericsson Avenue) east to MD 292 (Main Street) within the town of Betterton in northern Kent County. The highway was built as a concrete road in 1930. MD 295 was one of several highways constructed by the Maryland State Roads Commission as 9-foot (2.7 m) or 16-foot-wide (4.9 m) concrete roads through a $900,000 Kent County bond issue in 1929 and 1930. MD 295 was renumbered MD 293B between 1946 and 1952, likely in 1948.

== MD 296 ==
Maryland Route 296
- Location: Betterton
- Length: 0.25 mi (400 m)
- Existed: 1930–c. 1948

Maryland Route 296 was the designation for First Avenue, which ran 0.25 miles (0.40 km) east from MD 292 (Main Street) to the end of state maintenance within the town of Betterton in northern Kent County. The highway was built as a concrete road in 1930. MD 296 was one of several highways constructed by the Maryland State Roads Commission as 9-foot (2.7 m) or 16-foot-wide (4.9 m) concrete roads through a $900,000 Kent County bond issue in 1929 and 1930. MD 296 was renumbered MD 293A between 1946 and 1952, likely in 1948.

== MD 301 ==
Maryland Route 301
- Location: Dudley Corners–Crumpton
- Existed: 1927–1940

Maryland Route 301 was the designation for Dudley Corner Road from MD 300 at Dudley Corners north to Crumpton in northern Queen Anne's County. The highway was completed by 1927. MD 301 was replaced by a southern extension of MD 290 when US 301 was extended into Maryland in 1940.

== MD 315 ==
Maryland Route 315
- Location: Greensboro
- Existed: 1927–1950

Maryland Route 315 was the designation for Sunset Avenue from its railroad crossing at the west end of Greensboro east to MD 313 at the intersection of Sunset Avenue and Main Street within the town in northern Caroline County. The highway was paved as a concrete road by 1923. After MD 313's bypass of Greensboro opened in 1950, MD 314 was extended west to replace the Sunset Avenue portion of MD 313 and all of MD 315.

== MD 319 ==
Maryland Route 319
- Location: Linchester–Federalsburg
- Existed: 1927–1956

Maryland Route 319 was the designation for Preston Road from MD 16 and MD 331 near Linchester in far northern Dorchester County east to Federalsburg in far southern Caroline County. A portion of the highway west from Federalsburg was paved as a macadam road by 1921. The remainder of the highway was completed by 1930. After MD 313's bypass of Federalsburg opened in 1956, MD 318 was extended west through Federalsburg and replaced MD 319 to Linchester.

== MD 321 ==
Maryland Route 321
- Location: Elkridge
- Existed: 1927–1954

Maryland Route 321 was the designation for Main Street in Elkridge with two sections: from MD 477 to Brumbaugh St, and from Railroad Ave to US 1. MD 321, along with MD 322 and MD 323, replaced part of US 1 when it was rerouted due to the removal of the rail crossing. MD 321 was decommissioned by 1954 with the construction of I-895.

== MD 322 ==
Maryland Route 322
- Location: Federalsburg–Andersontown
- Existed: c. 1952–1954

Maryland Route 322 was the temporary designation for what is now MD 313 from Auction Road near Federalsburg north to MD 16 and MD 404 at Andersontown in southern Caroline County. MD 313 originally followed Auction Road, American Corner Road, and MD 16 via American Corner and Williston to MD 404 just south of Denton. Construction on the modern alignment of MD 313 began by 1950; MD 322 was assigned to the new highway by 1952. In 1954, MD 313 replaced MD 322 on the new highway from Federalsburg to Andersontown.

== MD 322 ==
Maryland Route 322
- Location: Elkridge
- Existed: 1927–c. 1946

Maryland Route 322 was a stub off MD 321 off of one side of the railroad tracks in Elkridge.

== MD 323 ==
Maryland Route 323
- Location: Elkridge
- Existed: 1927–c. 1946

Maryland Route 323 was a stub off MD 321 off of one side of the railroad tracks in Elkridge.

== MD 325 ==
Maryland Route 325
- Location: Catonsville
- Existed: 1930–c. 1978

Maryland Route 325 was the designation for Wade Avenue from Spring Grove State Hospital north to MD 144 in Catonsville. The highway was constructed in 1930. MD 325 was removed from the state highway system no earlier than 1978.

== MD 326 ==
Maryland Route 326
- Location: Leonardtown
- Existed: 1933–c. 1985

Maryland Route 326 was the designation for Washington Street from the waterfront north to the street's intersection with Fenwick Street within Leonardtown; MD 5 followed Fenwick and Washington streets through the center of town. The highway was constructed as a gravel road by 1933. MD 326 was removed from the state highway system no earlier than 1985.

== MD 327 ==
Maryland Route 327
- Location: Port Tobacco–La Plata
- Existed: 1930–1956

Maryland Route 327 was the designation for Valley Road and Mitchell Road from MD 6 in Port Tobacco north to US 301 (now Washington Avenue) near La Plata. The highway was constructed as a gravel road in two sections in 1929 and 1930. MD 327 was removed from the state highway system in 1956.

== MD 330 ==
Maryland Route 330
- Location: Kingsville
- Existed: 1927–c. 1985

Maryland Route 330 was the designation for the road from US 1 via Jerusalem Road to Bradshaw Road. It was only 500 feet, and was most likely unmarked, but was decommissioned in 1985 or earlier.

== MD 331 ==
Maryland Route 331
- Location: Cambridge–Easton
- Existed: 1927–1939

Maryland Route 331 was the designation for the Easton–Trappe road in southern Talbot County. The highway was one of the original state roads designated for improvement by the Maryland State Roads Commission in 1909. The Easton–Trappe Road followed present-day MD 565 north from Trappe. North from Peach Blossom Creek, the old highway is overlaid by US 50 and MD 322. The old alignment of MD 331 reappears as Washington Street in Easton, ending at Dover Street, where US 213 turned north onto Washington Street. MD 331 was paved from Easton in 1915 and reached Trappe by 1919. The state highway was extended south to Cambridge when the first Choptank River Bridge opened in December 1935. On the Cambridge side of the bridge, a dual highway was constructed south to MD 16. MD 331 was replaced by US 213 in 1939 when the U.S. Highway was rerouted to pass through Cambridge; MD 331 was assigned to US 213's old course from Vienna to Easton via Hurlock and Preston.

== MD 332 ==
Maryland Route 332
- Location: Easton
- Existed: 1927–c. 1961

Maryland Route 332 was the designation for Aurora Street from Washington Street–which was part of US 213, MD 333, and MD 565 at separate times during MD 332's existence—north to MD 331 (Dover Road) within Easton in central Talbot County. The highway was paved from Dover Road south to Idlewild Avenue by 1921. MD 332 was extended south to the Easton–Trappe Road (now Washington Street) by 1926. The highway was removed from the state highway system by 1961.

== MD 338 ==
Maryland Route 338
- Location: Conowingo
- Length: 1.24 mi (2.00 km)
- Existed: 1927–1979

Maryland Route 338 was the designation for Rowlandsville Road, which ran 1.24 miles (2.00 km) from Moore Road and Dr. Jack Road at Octoraro Creek north to US 1 and US 222 at Conowingo in northwestern Cecil County. The first section of Rowlandsville Road was constructed by Cecil County with state aid as a 14-foot-wide (4.3 m) macadam road from Old Conowingo Road at Oakwood south for about 2 miles (3.2 km) to south of the present US 1–US 222 intersection; construction was underway by 1915 and was completed by 1919. The highway was extended south to Rowlandsville on a 15-foot-wide (4.6 m) concrete road constructed between 1922 and 1924. US 1 originally met the highway at its northern terminus at Oakwood. However, in 1928, after US 1 was relocated to cross Conowingo Dam, MD 338's northern terminus was moved to intersection of US 1 and US 222, the latter of which replaced MD 338 on the highway from US 1 to Oakwood. MD 338 was transferred from state to county maintenance in a December 27, 1979, road transfer agreement.

== MD 339 ==
Maryland Route 339
- Location: Silver Spring
- Existed: 1955–c. 1999

Maryland Route 339 was the designation for Sligo Avenue from US 29 east to MD 320 within Silver Spring in southeastern Montgomery County. The highway was constructed by 1927 as part of MD 320. After MD 320 was placed on its present course from Washington to MD 650 in Adelphi in 1955, MD 339 was placed on the former piece of MD 320. MD 339 was removed from the state highway system by 1999 as part of the highway swap to designate the Great Seneca Highway as MD 119.

== MD 339 (1927) ==
Maryland Route 339
- Location: Rhodesdale
- Existed: 1927–c. 1954

Maryland Route 339 was the designation for a 0.4 mile loop off of MD 331 (former US 213) along Osborne Road in Rhodesdale. It shows up in a 1953 Maryland SRC map.

== MD 341 ==
Maryland Route 341
- Location: Brookview
- Existed: 1927–c. 1965

Maryland Route 341 was the designation for a loop off of MD 14 west of Brookview and Kelly Road. It was decommissioned by 1965.

== MD 342 ==
Maryland Route 342
- Location: Secretary
- Existed: 1930–1939

Maryland Route 342 was the designation for Secretary Road between MD 16 and Secretary in Dorchester County. MD 342 was paved between 1929 and 1930. The route was replaced by an extension of MD 14 in 1939.

== MD 344 ==
Maryland Route 344
- Location: Mount Holly–Vienna
- Existed: 1927–1939

Maryland Route 344 was the designation for the Vienna–Mount Holly road, which ran from MD 16 at Mount Holly east to US 213 in Vienna in central Dorchester County. The highway was constructed as a 14-foot-wide (4.3 m) macadam road from Mount Holly to Vienna by 1927. The highway's eastern terminus became US 213 when the U.S. Highway was relocated through Vienna instead of via Sharptown after the highway's bridge across the Nanticoke River opened in 1931. MD 344 was replaced by US 213 in 1939 when the U.S. Highway was rerouted via Cambridge between Vienna and Easton instead of via Hurlock and Preston. US 213 was itself replaced by US 50 in 1949.

== MD 345 ==
Maryland Route 345
- Location: Redhouse
- Existed: 1940–1954

Maryland Route 345 was the designation for Table Rock Road from US 50 near Redhouse south approximately 1 mile (1.6 km) along Backbone Mountain. The highway was constructed in 1940. MD 345 was removed from the state highway system in 1954.

== MD 351 (1927–1956) ==
Maryland Route 351
- Location: Fruitland
- Existed: 1927–1956

Maryland Route 351 was the designation of Meadowbridge Road and Main Street from Little Brown Road north to MD 663 (now Camden Avenue) in Fruitland in southern Wicomico County. The highway was constructed by Wicomico County with state aid as a 12-foot-wide (3.7 m) shell macadam road from just north of Little Brown Road to the south town limit of Fruitland by 1911. The state-aided road was extended to Backbone Road, an intersection that lies on the Wicomico–Somerset–Worcester county tripoint, by 1921. By 1923, the portion of the highway north of Little Brown Road was brought into the state highway system. In addition, a section of concrete road was constructed along Main Street in Fruitland to connect the highway with Camden Avenue, which became part of US 13 (now US 13 Business) in 1927. MD 351 was removed from the state highway system in 1956.

== MD 351 (1987–2014) ==
Maryland Route 351
- Location: Adamstown–Frederick
- Length: 4.24 mi (6.82 km)
- Existed: 1987–2014

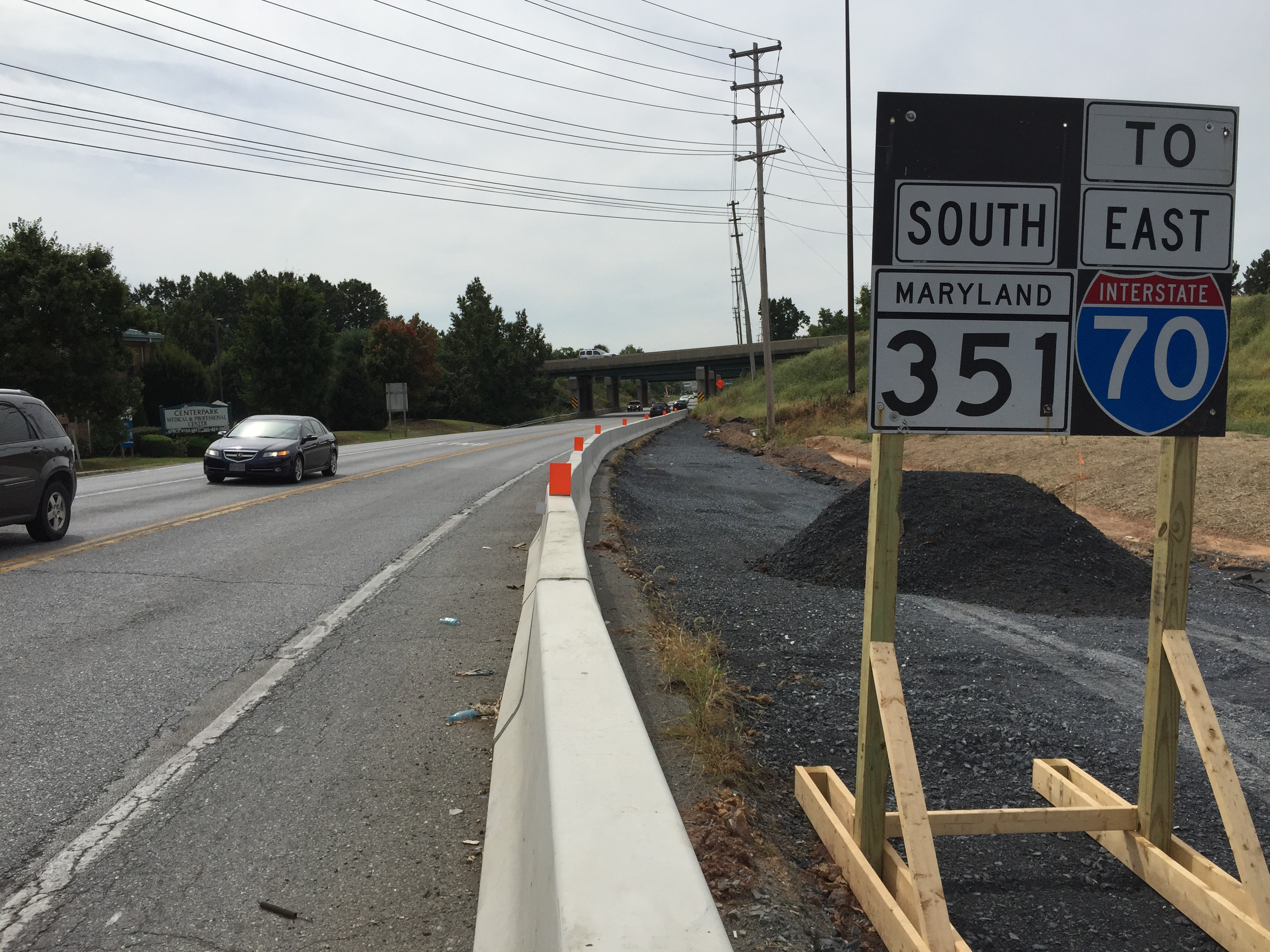
A sign for MD 351 remained along Ballenger Creek Pike between US 15/US 340 and I-70 in 2016

Maryland Route 351 was the designation for the 4.24-mile-long (6.82 km) portion of Ballenger Creek Pike from the beginning of state maintenance near Tuscarora Creek in Adamstown, which was 6.77 miles (10.90 km) north of the named road's southern terminus in Point of Rocks, north to MD 180 and I-70 in Frederick. The highway followed what was originally the Frederick and Ballinger Creek Turnpike from Ballenger Creek north to the Frederick and Jefferson Turnpike, which was succeeded by US 340 and later MD 180. A concrete road was built along the path of the turnpike from Ballenger Creek to south of Elmer Derr Road in 1926 and 1927. The concrete road was extended south to Renn Road in 1928 and to MD 351's present southern terminus near Adamstown in 1929 and 1930. The paved section of what became MD 78 was connected to US 340 by a county highway until the county highway was brought into the state system in 1938. MD 78's northern terminus was relocated when US 340 was reconstructed as a freeway in 1968. MD 78 and MD 180 then had concurrent termini at the two highways' interchange with US 340. In 1970, MD 180 was extended south along Ballenger Creek Pike to what had been MD 78's southern terminus near Adamstown, resulting in a cane-shaped route.

In 1987, to alleviate confusion in the rapidly growing Ballenger Creek area, the Maryland State Highway Administration decided to redesignate as MD 351 the portion of MD 180 from Adamstown to Solarex Court at the southern end of its interchange with US 340 and US 15. The ramp from MD 351 to eastbound I-70 was added around 1997. MD 351 was removed from the state highway system in 2002. MD 180's eastern terminus was moved to its present location and the remainder of state-maintained Ballenger Creek Pike was transferred to Frederick County. The state highway was transferred to the county after the completion of a Maryland State Highway Administration contract to eliminate a sharp curve in the highway between Lambert Drive and Corporate Drive and construct a new bridge over Ballenger Creek. Portions of the old road were reused on the campus of newly constructed Tuscarora High School. In 2003, much of MD 351 was brought back into the state highway system; however, the Lambert Drive–Corporate Drive section remained under Frederick County maintenance. The remainder of MD 351 was transferred to Frederick County in 2014.

== MD 355 ==
Maryland Route 355
- Location: Crisfield
- Length: 0.1 mi (160 m)
- Existed: 1927–c. 1946

Maryland Route 355 was located near Crisfield in Somerset County. It is unknown where this road was, but it existed per a 1937 Maryland SRC report.

== MD 356 ==
Maryland Route 356
- Location: Kingston
- Existed: 1927–1961

Maryland Route 356 was the designation for Kingston Lane from MD 413 east to MD 667 (now Old Westover Marion Road) in Kingston in southern Somerset County. Kingston Lane was under construction in 1911 as part of the proposed Westover–Crisfield road, but the gravel highway was bypassed by the highway that became MD 413 and later MD 667. MD 356 was removed from the state highway system by 1961, the same year MD 667 was removed from the adjacent portion of Old Westover Marion Road.

== MD 357 ==
Maryland Route 357
- Location: Marion Station
- Existed: 1927–1991

Maryland Route 357 was the designation for portions of Tulls Corner Road and Charles Cannon Road on either side of MD 413 and MD 667 at Marion Station in southern Somerset County. The highway was paved as a concrete road in 1923. MD 357 was removed from the state highway system in 1991.

== MD 359 ==
Maryland Route 359
- Location: Crisfield
- Existed: 1928–c. 1960

Maryland Route 359 was the designation for Boone Road from MD 380 near Crisfield south to a point north of the hamlet of Byrdtown in southern Somerset County. The highway was paved as a concrete road in 1928. MD 359 was widened in 1954. The highway was likely removed from the state highway system by 1960.

== MD 360 ==
Maryland Route 360
- Location: Crisfield
- Existed: 1928–c. 1960

Maryland Route 360 was the designation for Sackertown Road from MD 358 near Crisfield south to the hamlet of Sackertown in southern Somerset County. The highway was paved as a concrete road in 1928. MD 360 was widened in 1954. The highway was likely removed from the state highway system by 1960.

== MD 369 ==
Maryland Route 369
- Location: Newark
- Existed: 1927–1956

Maryland Route 369 was the designation for a portion of Basket Switch Road from US 113 near Newark east to the end of state maintenance near Newark in central Worcester County. The highway was paved as a concrete road by 1927. MD 369 was removed from the state highway system in 1956.

== MD 379 ==
Maryland Route 379
- Location: Leonardtown
- Existed: c. 1939–c. 1978

Maryland Route 379 was the designation for Park Avenue and Lawrence Avenue from Washington Street (then MD 326) west and north to MD 5 within Leonardtown in central St. Mary's County. The highway was built by 1939. MD 379 was widened to 20 feet (6.1 m) in 1954. Park Avenue and Lawrence Avenue were removed from the state highway system by 1978.

== MD 385 ==
Maryland Route 385
- Location: Bivalve–Whitehaven
- Existed: 1948–1964

Maryland Route 385 was the designation for Capitola Road from MD 349 near Bivalve east to MD 352 near Whitehaven in southwestern Wicomico County. The highway was assigned to Capitola Road in 1948. MD 385 was replaced with a westward extension of MD 352 in 1964.

== MD 386 ==
Maryland Route 386
- Location: Severna Park
- Existed: 1930–1973

Maryland Route 386 was the designation for Benfield Road and Evergreen Road from Truck House Road east to MD 648 within Severna Park in northern Anne Arundel County. The highway was constructed as a concrete road in 1929 and 1930. MD 386 was removed from the state highway system in 1973.

== MD 389 ==
Maryland Route 389
- Location: Seat Pleasant
- Existed: 1930–1955

Maryland Route 389 was the designation for Addison Road from MD 214 north to MD 704 within Seat Pleasant in central Prince George's County. The highway, which was previously named Chapel Road because it led to the Addison Chapel, was constructed as a 16-foot-wide (4.9 m) concrete road from MD 214 to the Washington, Baltimore and Annapolis Electric Railway in 1929 and 1930. When the railroad was replaced by MD 704 in 1944, MD 389's timber bridge across the railroad was removed and the grade separation levelled into an intersection. The highway was widened by 4 to 8 feet (1.2 to 2.4 m) with the addition of bituminous shoulders in 1948. MD 389 was removed from the state highway system in 1955.

== MD 391 ==
Maryland Route 391
- Location: Forest Glen–Silver Spring
- Length: 3.23 mi (5.20 km)
- Existed: 1930–1999

Maryland Route 391 was the designation for Seminary Road and Dale Drive, which ran 3.23 miles (5.20 km) from MD 192 in Forest Glen east to MD 320 in Silver Spring in southeastern Montgomery County. The highway was constructed as a concrete road along Seminary Road from MD 192 east to MD 97 in 1930. MD 391 was extended east along Dale Drive beyond US 29 to MD 320 in Silver Spring in 1934 and 1935 when that road was paved with macadam. The highway was removed from the state highway system along with many other state highways in Montgomery County in 1999 as part of the highway swap to designate the Great Seneca Highway as MD 119.

== MD 393 ==
Maryland Route 393
- Location: Galesville
- Existed: 1930–1949

Maryland Route 393 was the designation for Galesville Road and Main Street from MD 255 and MD 468 east to Galesville in southern Anne Arundel County. The highway was constructed as a gravel road from the Quaker Burying Ground, which is adjacent to the MD 255–MD 468 intersection, east to Galesville in 1929 and 1930. The western terminus at the Quaker Burying Ground was a four-way intersection between MD 393, which headed east to Galesville; MD 255, which headed west toward Owensville and south toward Shady Side; and MD 468, which headed north toward Edgewater. In 1949, MD 393 was replaced by MD 255; MD 468 was extended south along MD 255's old route to Shady Side.

== MD 394 (1946–1954) ==
Maryland Route 394
- Location: Gortner
- Existed: c. 1946–1954

Maryland Route 394 was the designation for Mason School Road and Pleasant Valley Road east from US 219 at Gortner in southern Garrett County. The highway was under construction by 1940 and marked as MD 394 by 1946. MD 394 was removed from the state highway system in 1954.

== MD 394 (1977–1997) ==
Maryland Route 394
- Location: Snow Hill
- Existed: 1977–1997

Maryland Route 394 was the designation for Market Street through Snow Hill in central Worcester County. The highway was constructed as part of what became US 113 in 1911 and 1912. US 113's bypass of Snow Hill was completed in 1975. The old course of the U.S. Highway through town became MD 394 by 1977. MD 394 was replaced with US 113 Business in 1997.

== MD 395 ==
Maryland Route 395
- Location: Cumberland
- Existed: 1927–1983

Maryland Route 395 was the designation for Naves Cross Road from US 220 (now MD 807) east to U.S. Route 40 in Maryland (now MD 144) near Cumberland. The highway was paved as a macadam road by Allegany County with state aid in 1911. MD 395's eastern end was adjusted when US 40 was reconstructed as the eastern end of the Cumberland Thruway (now I-68) in 1972. In 1983, US 220 was removed from the streets of Cumberland and instead used the Cumberland Thruway through the city; the U.S. Highway replaced MD 395 from the eastern end of the freeway west to MD 807, where the highway turned north onto Bedford Road toward Bedford, Pennsylvania. MD 144 replaced US 220 on Naves Cross Road when US 220 was moved to its present alignment north of Cumberland in 2000.

== MD 397 ==
Maryland Route 397
- Location: Airey–Mount Holly
- Existed: 1930–1973

Maryland Route 397 was the designation for Aireys Road from Indian Bone Road at Airey north to US 50 and MD 16 near Mount Holly in central Dorchester County. The highway was constructed as a concrete road from what was then solely MD 16 to Austin Road in 1929 and 1930. MD 397 was extended to Airey by 1933. The highway was removed from the state highway system in 1973.

== MD 398 ==
Maryland Route 398
- Location: Williamsport–Cearfoss
- Existed: 1930–1957

Maryland Route 398 was the designation for Greencastle Pike from US 11 in Williamsport north to MD 58 at Cearfoss in central Washington County. The highway was paved as a macadam road from Williamsport to south of US 40 at Huyett in 1929 and 1930. MD 398 was extended north through Huyett starting in 1930. The highway was completed to Cearfoss by 1933. The portion of Greencastle Pike from Cearfoss to the Pennsylvania state line remained a county highway. MD 398 was replaced by an extension of MD 63 north from Williamsport in 1957.

== MD 399 ==
Maryland Route 399
- Location: Damascus
- Existed: 1933–1974

Maryland Route 399 was the designation for Howard Chapel Road from MD 108 in Damascus north to near Long Corner Road in northern Montgomery County. The highway was constructed as a macadam road by 1933. MD 399 was removed from the state highway system in 1974.
