= Maryland Route 349 =

State highway in Maryland, United States

Maryland Route 349
- Nanticoke Road
- Maryland Route 349 highlighted in red

Route information
- Maintained by MDSHA and City of Salisbury
- Length: 22.32 mi (35.92 km)
- Existed: 1927–present
- Tourist routes: Chesapeake Country Scenic Byway

Major junctions
- West end: Dead end near Nanticoke
- MD 352 near Bivalve; MD 347 near Quantico; MD 352 near Quantico; MD 815 in Salisbury
- East end: US 50 Bus. in Salisbury

Location
- Country: United States
- State: Maryland
- Counties: Wicomico

Highway system
- Maryland highway system; Interstate; US; State; Scenic Byways
← MD 348	→ MD 350

Maryland Route 349 (MD 349) is a state highway in the U.S. state of Maryland. Known as Nanticoke Road, the state highway runs 22.32 miles (35.92 km) from a dead end in Nanticoke east to U.S. Route 50 Business (US 50 Business) in Salisbury. The first segment of MD 349 was constructed by 1910 west of Salisbury. The modern highway reached Quantico by 1919, Bivalve by 1925, and its western terminus by 1933. The only major change to MD 349 since is a realignment near Salisbury in the mid-1950s.

== Route description ==
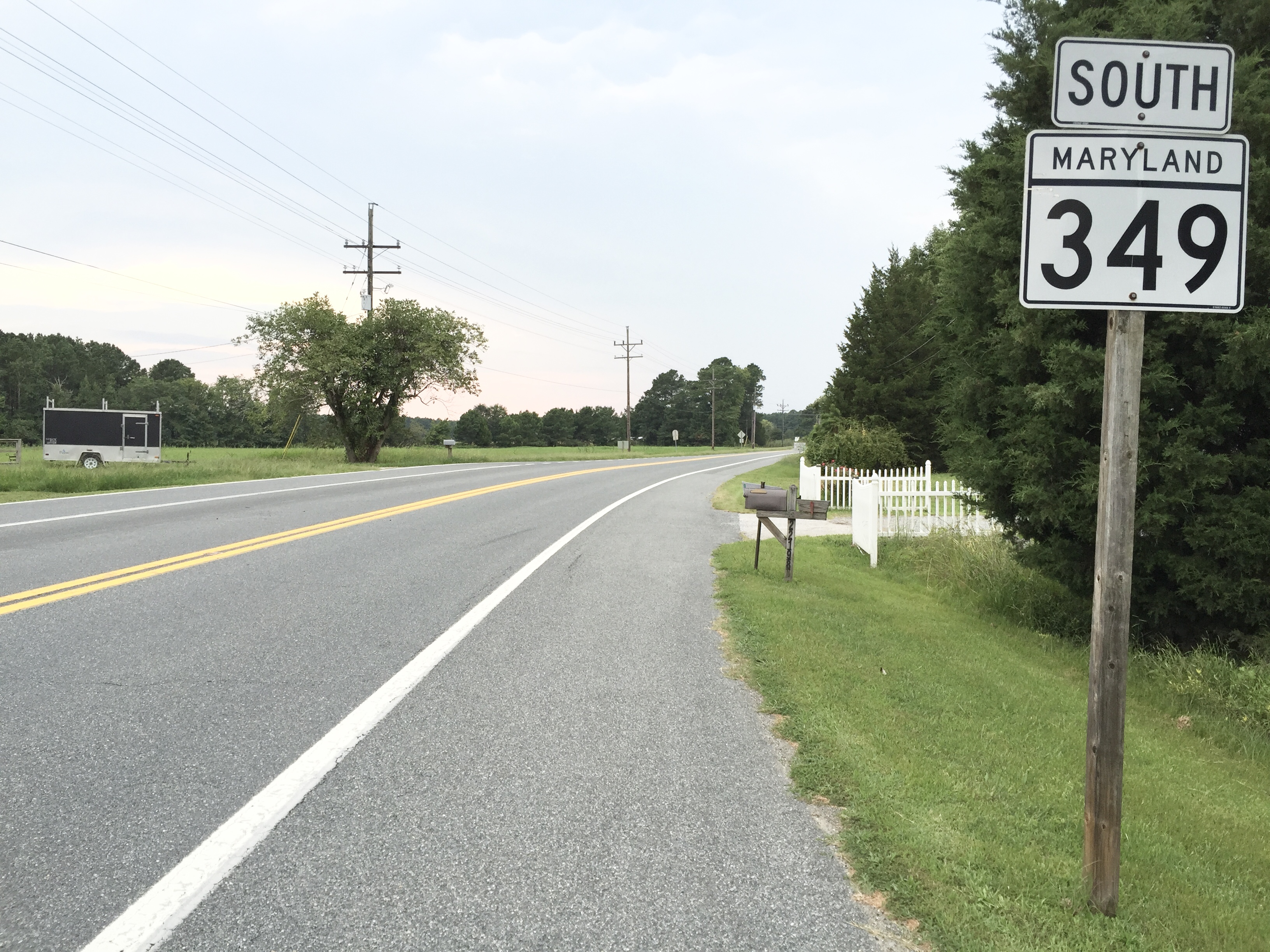
View south along MD 349 at MD 352 in Coxs Corner

MD 349 begins at a dead end at Jones Creek near the confluence of the Nanticoke River and Wicomico River as the two rivers enter Tangier Sound. The state highway heads north as a two-lane undivided road through the village of Nanticoke. North of Jesterville Road, MD 349 crosses Windsor Creek and Dunn Creek. The state highway continues through the hamlet of Bivalve, where the highway negotiates two sharp curves. MD 349 curves to the east as it leaves Bivalve and intersects Tyaskin Road, which was formerly MD 541. The state highway intersects the west end of MD 352 (Capitola Road), then turns northeast past the Chesapeake Forest Lands and traverses Wetipquin Creek.

At the hamlet of Royal Oak, MD 349 turns east toward its intersections with the southern terminus of MD 347 (Quantico Road) and with the other end of MD 352 (Whitehaven Road) in the hamlet of Catchpenny south of Quantico. Whitehaven Road leads south to the Whitehaven Ferry, a cable ferry that crosses the Wicomico River. After passing North Upper Ferry Road, which heads toward the Upper Ferry cable ferry crossing of the Wicomico River, the state highway begins to pass residential subdivisions and crosses Rockawalking Creek. Just west of Salisbury, the old alignment of MD 349, MD 815 (Old Quantico Road), splits to the east when MD 349 veers southeast. The state highway expands to a four-lane undivided highway before intersecting Parsons Road and the other end of MD 815. Upon crossing Mitchell Pond, MD 349 enters the city of Salisbury and municipal maintenance begins. Main Street splits to the southeast from the eastbound direction of MD 349 immediately before the state highway reaches its eastern terminus at US 50 Business (Salisbury Parkway). The road continues on the opposite side of the intersection as Isabella Street.

MD 349 is a part of the National Highway System as a principal arterial from Fire Tower Road near Quantico to its eastern terminus in Salisbury.

== History ==
MD 349 was paved from Salisbury west to Rockawalkin Creek by 1910. The improved highway extended west to Catchpenny in 1919 and to Royal Oak in 1921. MD 349 was complete to Wetipquin Creek in 1923 and to Bivalve in 1925. The highway was complete to its western terminus in Nanticoke in 1933. Beyond the widening of the road from Salisbury to Tyaskin Road in 1950, the only significant change in MD 349 is the realignment of the highway just west of Salisbury in 1956, with MD 815 assigned to the old alignment.

== Junction list ==
The entire route is in Wicomico County.

Location	mi	km	Destinations	Notes
Nanticoke	0.00	0.00	Dead end	Western terminus
Bivalve	7.58	12.20	MD 352 east (Capitola Road) – Whitehaven	Western terminus of MD 352
Quantico	15.14	24.37	MD 347 north (Quantico Road) – Quantico, Hebron	Southern terminus of MD 347
Quantico	15.77	25.38	MD 352 west (Whitehaven Road) – Whitehaven	Eastern terminus of MD 352
Salisbury	21.45	34.52	MD 815 east (Old Quantico Road)	Western terminus of MD 815
Salisbury	22.15	35.65	MD 815 west (Old Quantico Road)	Eastern terminus of MD 815
Salisbury	22.32	35.92	US 50 Bus. (Salisbury Parkway) to US 13 / US 13 Bus. / Isabella Street east – Cambridge, Ocean City	Eastern terminus
1.000 mi = 1.609 km; 1.000 km = 0.621 mi
