= Maryland Route 352 =

State highway in Maryland, United States

Maryland Route 352
- Maryland Route 352 highlighted in red

Route information
- Maintained by MDSHA
- Length: 10.03 mi (16.14 km)
- Existed: 1933–present
- Tourist routes: Chesapeake Country Scenic Byway

Major junctions
- West end: MD 349 near Bivalve
- East end: MD 349 near Quantico

Location
- Country: United States
- State: Maryland
- Counties: Wicomico

Highway system
- Maryland highway system; Interstate; US; State; Scenic Byways
← MD 350	→ MD 353

Maryland Route 352 (MD 352) is an east–west state highway in the U.S. state of Maryland. The state highway runs 10.03 miles (16.14 km) between intersections with MD 349 near Bivalve on the west and near Quantico on the east. The Whitehaven Road portion of MD 352 was constructed as a state highway from Catchpenny west to Green Hill Creek in the early 1930s. The state highway was extended south to Whitehaven, the north landing of the Whitehaven Ferry, by 1946. The Capitola Road portion of MD 352 was originally designated MD 385 in the late 1940s and absorbed into MD 352 in the 1960s.

== Route description ==
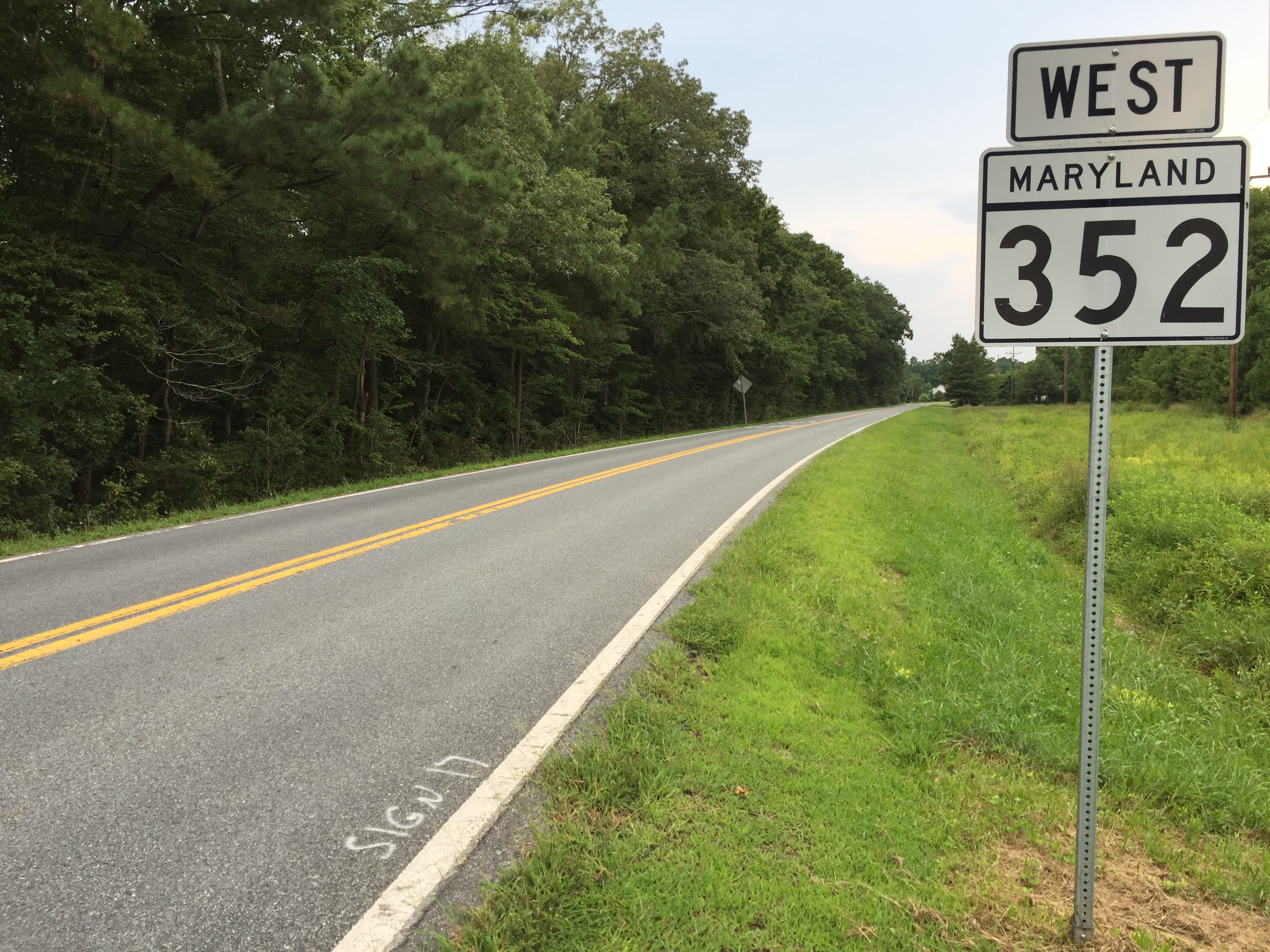
View west along MD 352 at Whitehaven Road in Capitola

MD 352 begins at an intersection with MD 349 (Nanticoke Road) known as Cox's Corner near Bivalve. The state highway heads southeast as two-lane undivided Capitola Road. MD 352 passes by the historic Yellow Brick House and farmland before veering east at Trinity Church Road, which leads to Ellis Bay Wildlife Management Area. The state highway continues east until a perpendicular intersection with Whitehaven Road. Whitehaven Road south leads to Whitehaven, which features the Whitehaven Historic District, including the Whitehaven Hotel, and the Whitehaven Ferry, a cable ferry across the Wicomico River to Mount Vernon in Somerset County. MD 352 turns north onto Whitehaven Road and passes St. Bartholomew's Episcopal Church. The state highway curves northeast through the Chesapeake Forest Lands, then goes by an area of intensive agriculture as the highway crosses Green Hill Creek. MD 352 passes the Green Hill Yacht and Country Club shortly before reaching its eastern terminus at MD 349 at the hamlet of Catchpenny near Quantico.

== History ==
Maryland Route 385
- Location: Bivalve–Whitehaven
- Existed: 1948–1964

The first portion of MD 352 was constructed between 1930 and 1933 between Catchpenny and Green Hill Creek. The portion of Whitehaven Road south of Green Hill was maintained as a county highway until the MD 352 designation was extended to Whitehaven by 1946. The Capitola Road segment was designated MD 385 in 1949. The segment of Whitehaven Road south of Capitola Road was returned to county maintenance and MD 352 assumed its present course, taking over the course of MD 385, in 1964.

== Junction list ==
The entire route is in Wicomico County.

Location	mi	km	Destinations	Notes
Bivalve	0.00	0.00	MD 349 (Nanticoke Road) – Nanticoke	Western terminus
Whitehaven	3.44	5.54	Whitehaven Road south – Whitehaven Ferry	MD 352 turns north onto Whitehaven Road; Whitehaven Road south is old alignment of MD 352
Quantico	10.03	16.14	MD 349 (Nanticoke Road) – Salisbury	Eastern terminus
1.000 mi = 1.609 km; 1.000 km = 0.621 mi
