= Whitehaven Historic District =

Historic district in Maryland, United States

- U.S. National Register of Historic Places
- U.S. Historic district
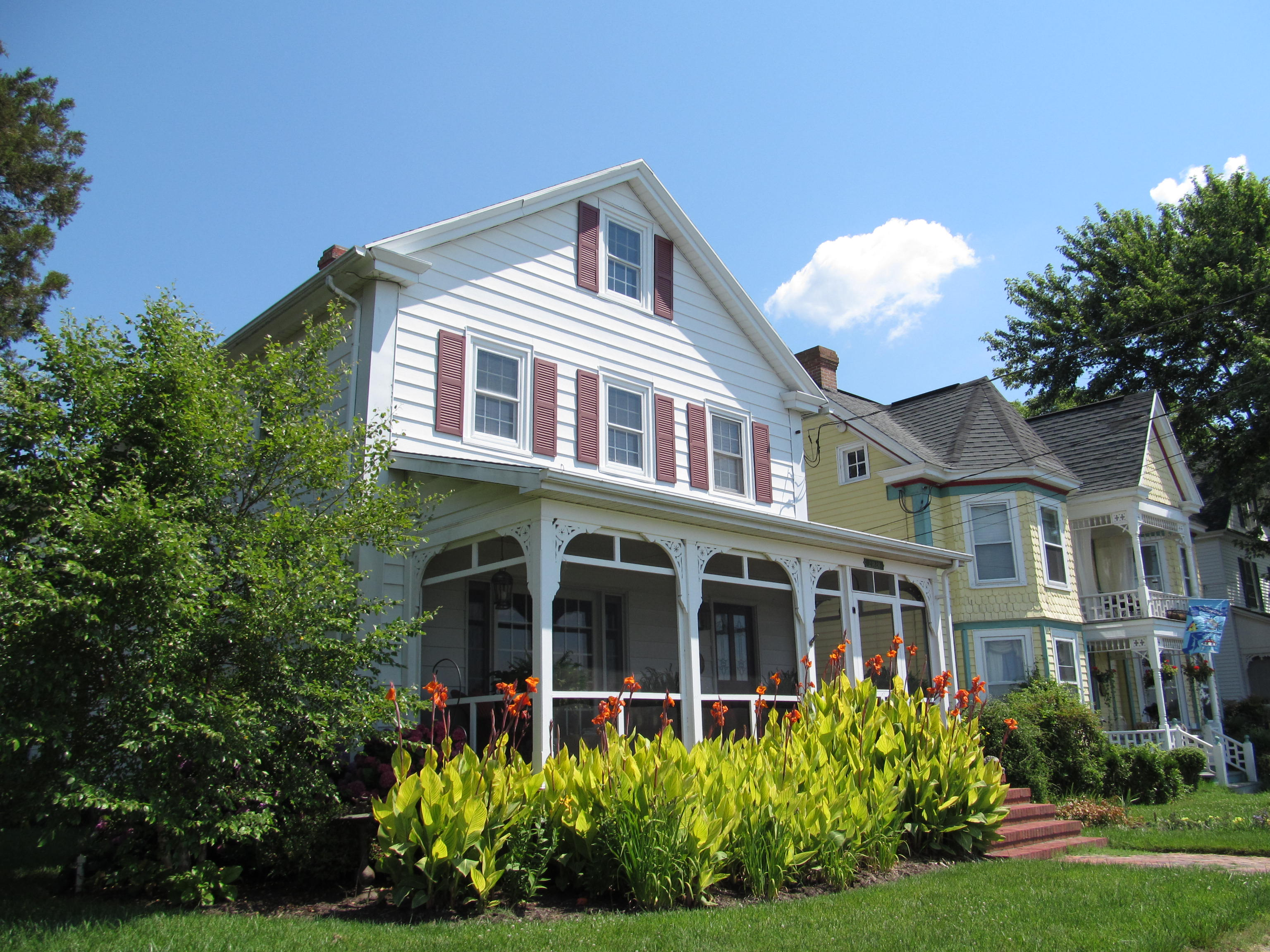
- Homes in the historic district

- Location within Maryland Location within the United States
- Location: Whitehaven Rd., Church and River Sts., Cinder and Locust Lanes, Whitehaven, Maryland
- Coordinates: 38°16′7″N 75°47′28″W
- Area: 33 acres (13 ha)
- Built: 1687
- Architectural style: Late Victorian, Federal
- NRHP reference No.: 80001843
- Added to NRHP: January 9, 1980

Whitehaven Historic District is a national historic district in Whitehaven, Wicomico County, Maryland. It is located at the end of Whitehaven Road (an extension of Maryland Route 352) on the north bank of the Wicomico River. The Whitehaven Ferry that crosses the river here has been in continuous operation since 1688 or earlier. The district encompasses a late-19th century village, consisting of the Whitehaven Hotel, church, school, marine railway, and 24 houses dating from the 19th century, two 20th-century and one 18th-century dwellings. It is one of the oldest towns in this part of Maryland, authorized by the General Assembly in the late 17th century.

It was added to the National Register of Historic Places in 1980.
