= Maryland Route 347 =

State highway in Maryland, United States

Maryland Route 347
- Maryland Route 347 highlighted in red

Route information
- Maintained by MDSHA
- Length: 6.92 mi (11.14 km)
- Existed: 1927–present
- Tourist routes: Chesapeake Country Scenic Byway

Major junctions
- South end: MD 349 in Quantico
- MD 670 in Hebron
- North end: US 50 in Hebron

Location
- Country: United States
- State: Maryland
- Counties: Wicomico

Highway system
- Maryland highway system; Interstate; US; State; Scenic Byways
← MD 346	→ MD 348

Maryland Route 347 (MD 347) is a state highway in the U.S. state of Maryland. The state highway runs 6.92 miles (11.14 km) from MD 349 in Quantico north to U.S. Route 50 (US 50) in Hebron. MD 347 was constructed as a modern highway in Hebron in the mid-1910s. The remainder of the highway was constructed in the late 1920s.

== Route description ==
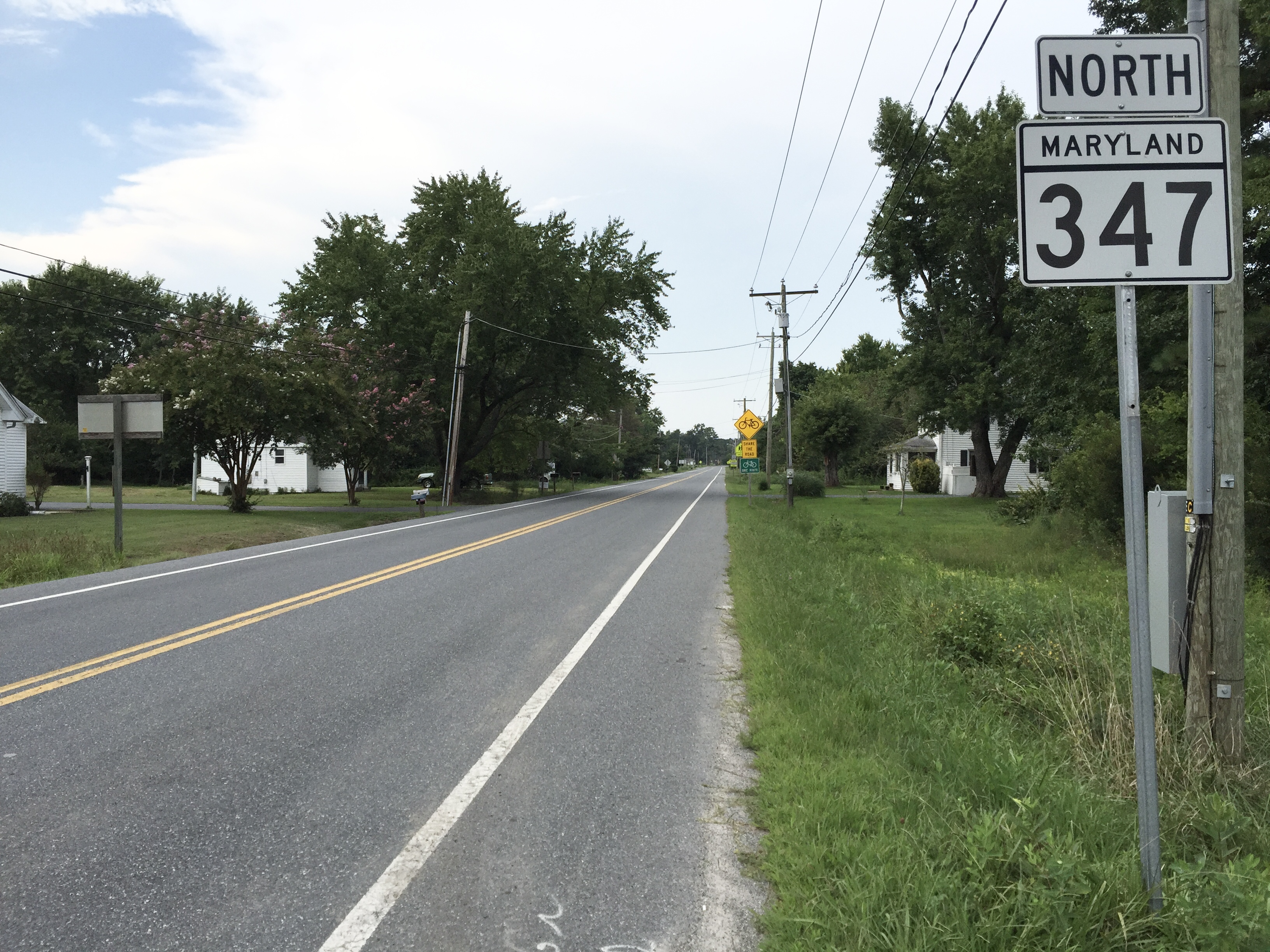
View north along MD 347 at MD 349 in Quantico

MD 347 begins at an intersection with MD 349 (Nanticoke Road) in Quantico. The state highway heads north as two-lane undivided Quantico Road past scattered residences and runs east of Westside Primary School. After veering northwest at Catchpenny Road, MD 347 crosses Quantico Creek and passes through the historic center of Quantico. The state highway leaves Quantico after a sharp turn to the northeast at Old Athol Road and passes through farmland. Upon arriving in the town of Hebron, the highway passes southeast of Westside Intermediate School and the historic home St. Giles. Within Hebron, MD 347 is known as Main Street and intersects the western terminus of MD 670 (Lillian Street). After leaving Hebron, the state highway continues northeast as Hebron Road, crossing Rewastico Creek before reaching its northern terminus at US 50 (Ocean Gateway).

== History ==
The portion of MD 347 between Hebron and what is now US 50 was completed as a state-aid road by 1915. The next segment completed was from MD 349 to the center of Quantico by 1926. MD 347 was completed between Hebron and Quantico by 1930.

== Junction list ==
The entire route is in Wicomico County.

Location	mi	km	Destinations	Notes
Quantico	0.00	0.00	MD 349 (Nanticoke Road) – Whitehaven, Salisbury, Nanticoke	Southern terminus
Hebron	5.88	9.46	MD 670 east (Lillian Street)	Western terminus of MD 670
Hebron	6.92	11.14	US 50 (Ocean Gateway) – Cambridge, Salisbury	Northern terminus
1.000 mi = 1.609 km; 1.000 km = 0.621 mi
