= Parker Pond (Maryland) =

- Location within Maryland Location within the United States
- Coordinates: 38°21′00″N 75°32′42″W
- Max. length: 1.02 miles (1.64 km)
- Surface area: 41.5 acres 41.5 acres (16.8 ha)
- Water volume: 245.0 acres per foot (325.3 ha/m)
- Surface elevation: 36 ft (11 m)

Parker Pond is a pond in Wicomico County, Maryland formed by a widening of Beaverdam Creek.

Parker Pond is a man-made body of water, constructed around 1778 using soil excavated from an area adjacent to the east sIde of the dam. The original purpose of the dam was to provide water power, operate a gristmill and a sawmill. In the late 1700’s the pond was known as Robbins' Mill Lot owned by James B. Robbins.

The dam is located on Beaverdam Creek approximately 1.5 miles upstream from Beaglin Park Dam forming Schumaker Pond within the Wicomico River drainage basin.
