= Upper Ferry =

Upper Ferry may refer to:

- Upper Ferry, Newfoundland and Labrador, a settlement on the island of Newfoundland, Canada
- Upper Ferry (Wicomico River), a ferry across the Wicomico River in Maryland, United States
