= Maryland Route 670 =

State highway in Maryland, United States

Maryland Route 670
- Lillian Street

Route information
- Maintained by MDSHA
- Length: 1.48 mi (2.38 km)
- Existed: 1939–present

Major junctions
- West end: MD 347 in Hebron
- East end: US 50 near Hebron

Location
- Country: United States
- State: Maryland
- Counties: Wicomico

Highway system
- Maryland highway system; Interstate; US; State; Scenic Byways
← MD 669	→ MD 672

Maryland Route 670 (MD 670) is a state highway in the U.S. state of Maryland. Known as Lillian Street, the state highway runs 1.48 miles (2.38 km) from MD 347 east to U.S. Route 50 (US 50) within Hebron in western Wicomico County. MD 670 was constructed in the late 1930s.

== Route description ==
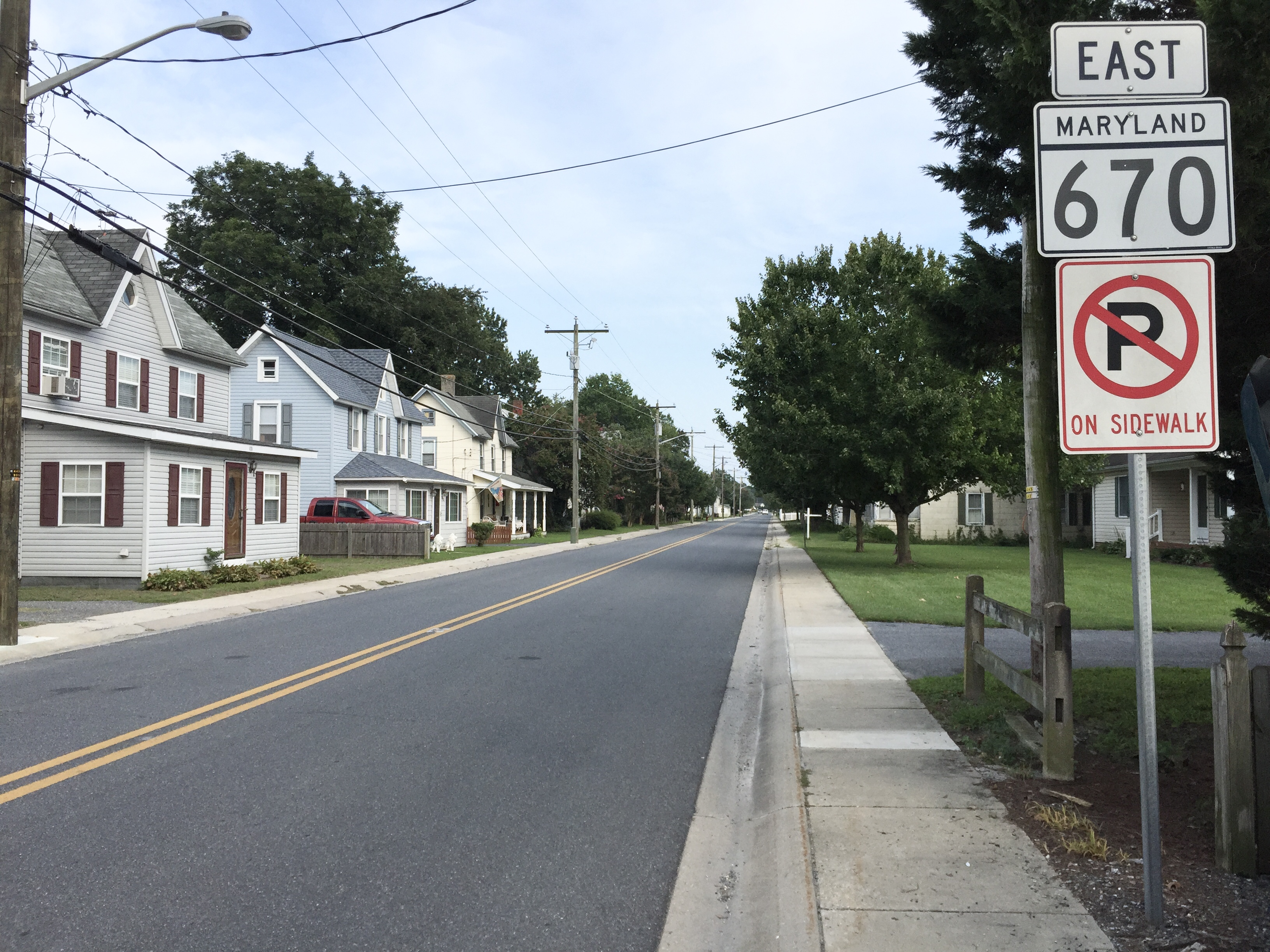
View east along MD 670 at MD 347 in Hebron

MD 670 begins at an intersection with MD 347 (Main Street) in the town of Hebron. The two-lane undivided state highway heads southeast through the town, then turns east after passing Chestnut Tree Road and leaves the town limits. MD 670 continues east through farmland until its eastern terminus at US 50 (Ocean Gateway). Traffic heading eastbound on MD 670 is required to turn onto US 50 east; US 50 west can be accessed via a crossover in the divided highway a short distance to the east.

== History ==
MD 670 was under construction by 1936 and completed in 1939. Direct access between eastbound MD 670 and westbound US 50 was removed in 2007.

== Junction list ==
The entire route is in Hebron, Wicomico County.

mi	km	Destinations	Notes
0.00	0.00	MD 347 (Main Street) / West Lillian Street – Quantico	Western terminus
1.48	2.38	US 50 east (Ocean Gateway) – Salisbury	Eastern terminus; no direct access from eastbound MD 670 to westbound US 50
1.000 mi = 1.609 km; 1.000 km = 0.621 mi: Incomplete access
