= Salisbury metropolitan area =

Salisbury metropolitan area Salisbury, MD Metropolitan Statistical Area
- Metropolitan Statistical Area
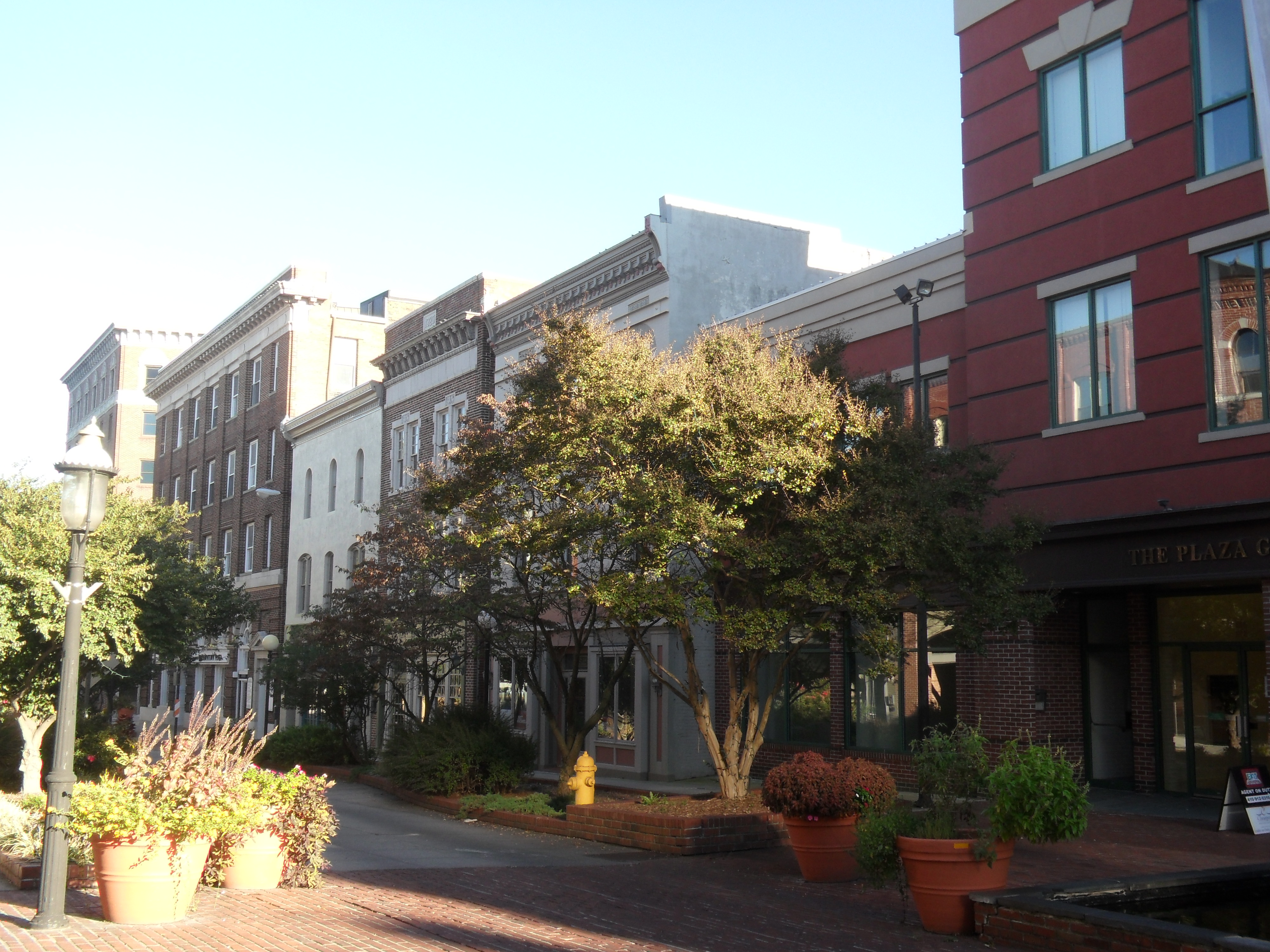
- Main Street in Salisbury
Interactive Map of Salisbury–Ocean Pines, MD CSA
City of Salisbury
Salisbury, MD MSA
Ocean City, MD
Ocean Pines, MD µSA
- Country: United States
- State: Maryland
- Largest city: Salisbury
- Other cities: Pocomoke City; Princess Anne; Ocean Pines; Ocean City
- Time zone: UTC−5 (EST)
  - Summer (DST): UTC−4 (EDT)

The Salisbury, MD Metropolitan Statistical Area is a United States Census Bureau–designated metropolitan area centered in and around Salisbury, Maryland, including two counties in Maryland: Somerset and Wicomico. Until 2023, the Salisbury MSA also included Worcester County.

Under the previous CBSA definition, the metropolitan area had a population of 423,481 residents as of the 2020 census. In addition, under the previous Combined Statistical Area definition, the Salisbury-Cambridge, MD-DE Combined Statistical Area of the Salisbury metropolitan area with the Cambridge micropolitan statistical area had a total 2020 population of 456,012.

== Demographics ==
As of the 2000 census, of there were 109,931 people, 40,579 households, and 27,223 families residing within the MSA. The racial makeup of the MSA was 68.92% White, 27.32% African American, 0.25% Native American, 1.46% Asian, 0.02% Pacific Islander, 0.73% from other races, and 1.30% from two or more races. Hispanic or Latino of any race were 1.99% of the population.

The median income for a household in the area was $34,469, and the median income for a family was $42,386. Males had a median income of $29,989 versus $23,292 for females. The per capita income for the MSA was $17,568.

== History ==
Prior to the 2010 census, the Salisbury metropolitan area consisted only of Wicomico and Somerset counties in Maryland. As of the 2000 census, the MSA had a population of 109,391 (though a July 1, 2009 estimate placed the population at 120,181). Worcester County, Maryland was considered a part of the Ocean Pines Micropolitan Statistical Area and Sussex County, Delaware was considered a part of the Seaford Micropolitan Statistical Area.

In 2018, the United States Census Bureau defined the Salisbury-Cambridge, MD-DE Combined Statistical Area, which combined the Salisbury metropolitan area with the Cambridge, Maryland Micropolitan Statistical Area (Dorchester County).

The 2018 designation was reversed effective July 2023 as Dorchester County was re-admitted to the Washington-Baltimore Combined Statistical Area and Worcester County, Maryland was separated into its own micropolitan area.

The current Salisbury–Ocean Pines Combined Statistical Area consists of the Salisbury metropolitan area and the Ocean Pines micropolitan area. As of the 2000 Census, the CSA had a population of 155,934 (though a July 1, 2009 estimate placed the population at 169,303).

== Counties ==
- Somerset County, Maryland
- Wicomico County, Maryland
- Worcester County, Maryland

== Communities ==
=== Places with more than 20,000 inhabitants ===
- Salisbury, Maryland (principal city)

=== Places with 5,000 to 20,000 inhabitants ===
- Ocean City, Maryland
- Ocean Pines, Maryland (census-designated place)

=== Places with 1,000 to 5,000 inhabitants ===
- Berlin, Maryland
- Crisfield, Maryland
- Delmar, Maryland
- Fruitland, Maryland
- Pittsville, Maryland
- Pocomoke City, Maryland
- Princess Anne, Maryland
- Snow Hill, Maryland
- West Ocean City, Maryland (census-designated place)

=== Places with 500 to 1,000 inhabitants ===
- Deal Island, Maryland (census-designated place)
- Eden, Maryland (census-designated place)
- Fairmount, Maryland (census-designated place)
- Hebron, Maryland
- Mount Vernon, Maryland (census-designated place)
- Sharptown, Maryland
- Willards, Maryland

=== Places with less than 500 inhabitants ===
- Allen, Maryland (census-designated place)
- Bishopville, Maryland (census-designated place)
- Bivalve, Maryland (census-designated place)
- Chance, Maryland (census-designated place)
- Dames Quarter, Maryland (census-designated place)
- Frenchtown-Rumbly, Maryland (census-designated place)
- Girdletree, Maryland (census-designated place)
- Jesterville, Maryland (census-designated place)
- Mardela Springs, Maryland
- Nanticoke, Maryland (census-designated place)
- Nanticoke Acres, Maryland (census-designated place)
- Newark, Maryland (census-designated place)
- Parsonsburg, Maryland (census-designated place)
- Powellville, Maryland (census-designated place)
- Quantico, Maryland (census-designated place)
- Smith Island, Maryland (census-designated place)
- Stockton, Maryland (census-designated place)
- Tyaskin, Maryland (census-designated place)
- Waterview, Maryland (census-designated place)
- West Pocomoke, Maryland (census-designated place)
- Whaleyville, Maryland (census-designated place)
- Whitehaven, Maryland (census-designated place)

== Transportation ==
=== Major highways ===
- US 9
- US 13
- US 50
- US 113
- DE 1
- DE 16
- DE 20
- DE 24
- DE 26
- Route 54
- DE 404
- MD 12
- MD 90
- MD 313
- MD 413
- MD 528

=== Airports ===
- Salisbury–Ocean City–Wicomico Regional Airport
- Bennett Airport
- Crisfield Municipal Airport
- Ocean City Municipal Airport

=== Mass transit ===
- Shore Transit serves Somerset, Wicomico, and Worcester counties with local routes in Salisbury and commuter routes between cities and towns in the three counties.
- Ocean City Transportation A Bus service in Ocean City with connections to Shore Transit and DART First State.

== Colleges and universities ==
- Salisbury University
- University of Maryland Eastern Shore
- Wor–Wic Community College

== See also ==
- Maryland statistical areas
