= Schumaker Pond =

Pond in Maryland

Coordinates: 38°20′57″N 75°33′56″W

- Interactive map of Schumaker Pond
- Location: Wicomico County, Maryland, United States
- Type: Pond
- Primary inflows: Beaverdam Creek
- Basin countries: United States
- Surface area: 35 acres (14 ha)
- Average depth: Up to 5 feet (2 meters) near the dam

Schumaker Pond is a 35-acre pond created by damming Beaverdam Creek, in Wicomico County, Maryland. The pond is owned by the City of Salisbury and is on the eastern end of the Salisbury City Park. The maximum water depth is 5 feet near the dam, in the old creek channel. In the 1950s and 1960s, Schumaker Pond was popular for swimming, but swimming has since been banned due to the large quantities of E. coli bacteria in the water. Since then, the pond is often used for fishing.

The dam is located on Beaverdam Creek approximately 1.5 miles downstream from Parker Pond within the Wicomico River drainage basin.

== Aquatic life ==
Hydrilla verticillata has been documented in the pond since 1990 and typically reaches 100% coverage. Nine species of fish have been identified in the pond:

1. Largemouth bass
2. Bluegill sunfish
3. Creek chubsucker
4. Golden shiner
5. Pumpkinseed sunfish
6. Chain pickerel
7. Black crappie
8. Brown bullhead
9. American eel
