= Beaverdam Creek (Wicomico County) =

Small river in Wicomico County, Maryland

Location
- Country: United States
- State: Maryland
- County: Wicomico County

Physical characteristics
- Mouth: Wicomico River
  - location: Eastern Shore of Maryland
  - coordinates: 38°21′11.2″N 75°34′21.2″W

Basin features
- Waterbodies: Parker Pond; Schumaker Pond

Beaverdam Creek is a tributary of the Wicomico River on the Eastern Shore of Maryland. Parker Pond and Schumaker Pond were created by damming Beaverdam Creek.

Beaverdam Creek runs through the historic Salisbury City Park.
