= Jesterville, Maryland =

Jesterville
- Census-designated place
- Location within the state of Maryland Jesterville (the United States)
- Coordinates: 38°17′12″N 75°53′45″W
- Country: United States
- State: Maryland
- County: Wicomico

Area
  - Total: 1.60 sq mi (4.14 km^{2})
  - Land: 1.59 sq mi (4.11 km^{2})
  - Water: 0.015 sq mi (0.04 km^{2})
- Elevation: 10 ft (3.0 m)

Population (2020)
  - Total: 179
  - Density: 112.9/sq mi (43.59/km^{2})
- Time zone: UTC-5 (Eastern (EST))
  - Summer (DST): UTC-4 (EDT)
- Area codes: 410 & 443
- FIPS code: 24-42575
- GNIS feature ID: 590561

Jesterville is an unincorporated community and census-designated place in Wicomico County, Maryland, United States. Its population was 179 as of the 2020 census. It is part of the Salisbury, Maryland-Delaware Metropolitan Statistical Area.

== Demographics ==
Historical population
Census	Pop.	Note	%±
2020	179		—
U.S. Decennial Census
