= Roaring Point =

Natural river jetty in Maryland

- Peninsula
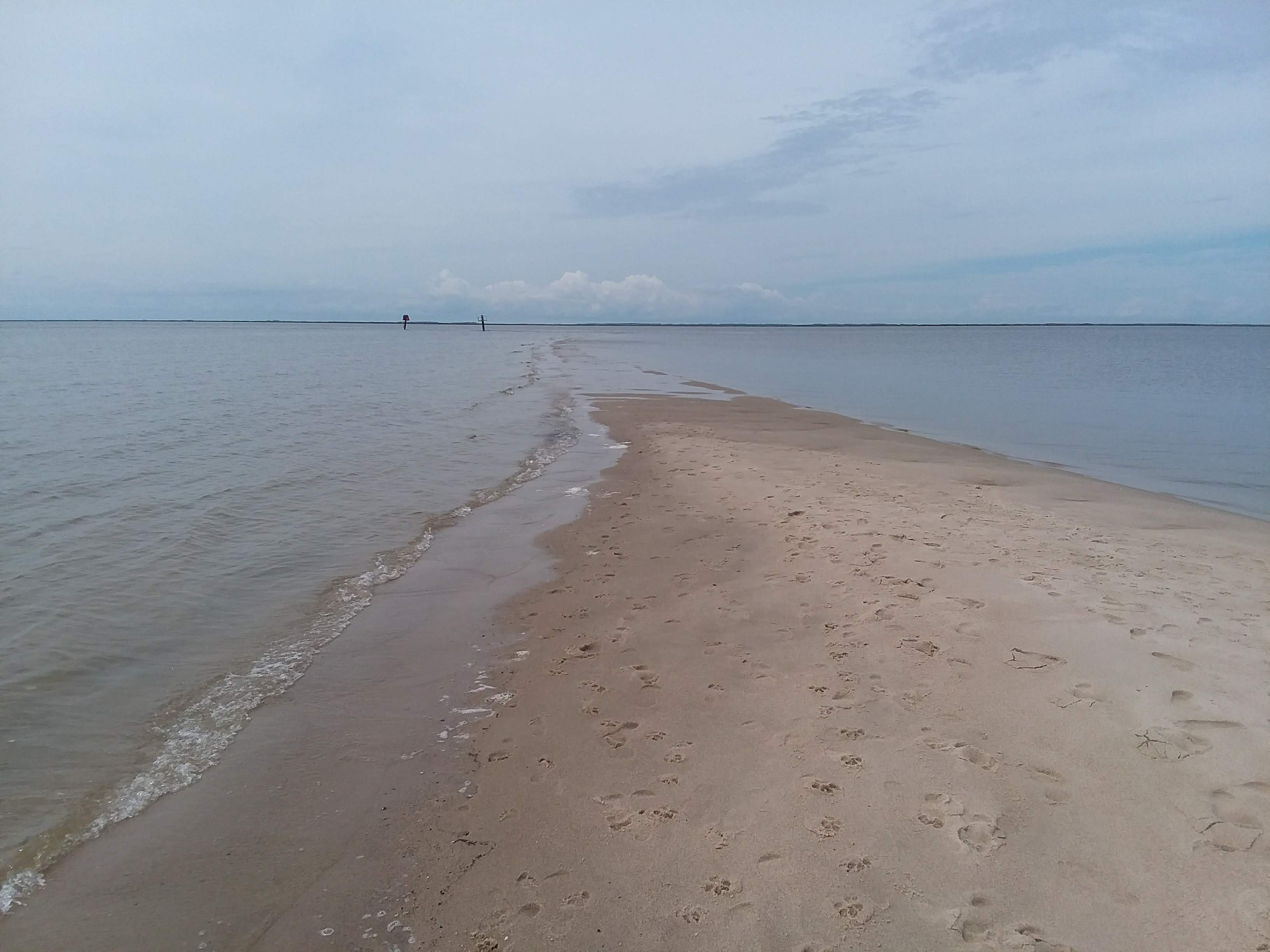
- Roaring Point at low tide

- Location in Maryland
- Coordinates: 38.2646°N 75.9203°W
- Location: Nanticoke, Maryland

Dimensions
  - Length: 1,000 ft.
- Elevation: 0 m (0 ft)

Roaring Point is a natural jetty on the Nanticoke River. Located southwest of Nanticoke, Maryland, the point is inside of Roaring Point Park.

Due to its rocky composition and length, the point is a popular spot for fishing and crabbing among the local watermen.
