= Nanticoke Acres, Maryland =

Nanticoke Acres
- Census-designated place
- Location within the state of Maryland Nanticoke Acres (the United States)
- Coordinates: 38°15′30″N 75°54′37″W
- Country: United States
- State: Maryland
- County: Wicomico

Area
  - Total: 0.26 sq mi (0.68 km^{2})
  - Land: 0.26 sq mi (0.68 km^{2})
  - Water: 0 sq mi (0.00 km^{2})
- Elevation: 3 ft (0.91 m)

Population (2020)
  - Total: 120
  - Density: 455.8/sq mi (175.99/km^{2})
- Time zone: UTC−5 (Eastern (EST))
  - Summer (DST): UTC−4 (EDT)
- ZIP code: 21840
- Area codes: 410 & 443
- FIPS code: 24-54930
- GNIS feature ID: 1668461

Nanticoke Acres is an unincorporated community and census-designated place in Wicomico County, Maryland, United States. Its population was 103 as of the 2010 census. It is part of the Salisbury, Maryland-Delaware Metropolitan Statistical Area.

== Demographics ==
Historical population
Census	Pop.	Note	%±
2020	120		—
U.S. Decennial Census
