= Whitehaven Hotel =

- U.S. National Register of Historic Places
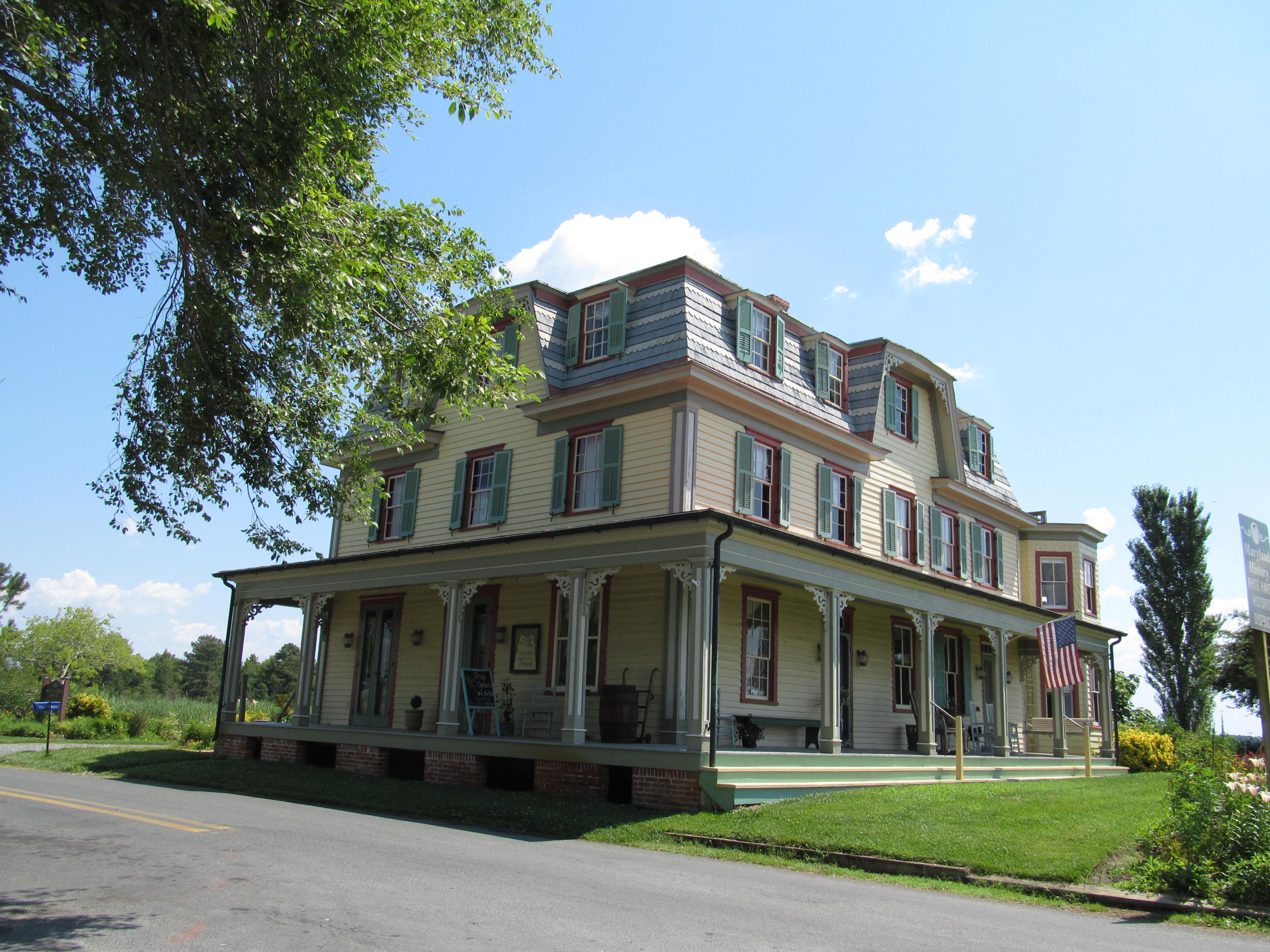
- Hotel in 2012

- Location within Maryland Location within the United States
- Location: 2685 Whitehaven Road (MD 358), Whitehaven, Maryland
- Coordinates: 38°16′7″N 75°47′20″W
- Area: 1.2 acres (0.49 ha)
- Architectural style: Federal, Second Empire
- NRHP reference No.: 96000535
- Added to NRHP: May 10, 1996

Whitehaven Hotel is a historic hotel located at Whitehaven, Wicomico County, Maryland, United States. It is a three-story, U-shaped, steeply pitched mansard-roofed Second Empire-style frame structure. The center core of the hotel is a Federal side hall / parlor dwelling, erected around 1810–1815. The hotel interior retains much of its early and later 19th century woodwork.

The Whitehaven Hotel is located at the site of the Whitehaven Ferry which has crossed the Wicomico River at this location since 1687. The hotel is operating as a Bed and Breakfast with eight rooms.

The Whitehaven Hotel was listed on the National Register of Historic Places in 1996.
