= Yellow Brick House =

Historic house in Maryland, United States

- U.S. National Register of Historic Places
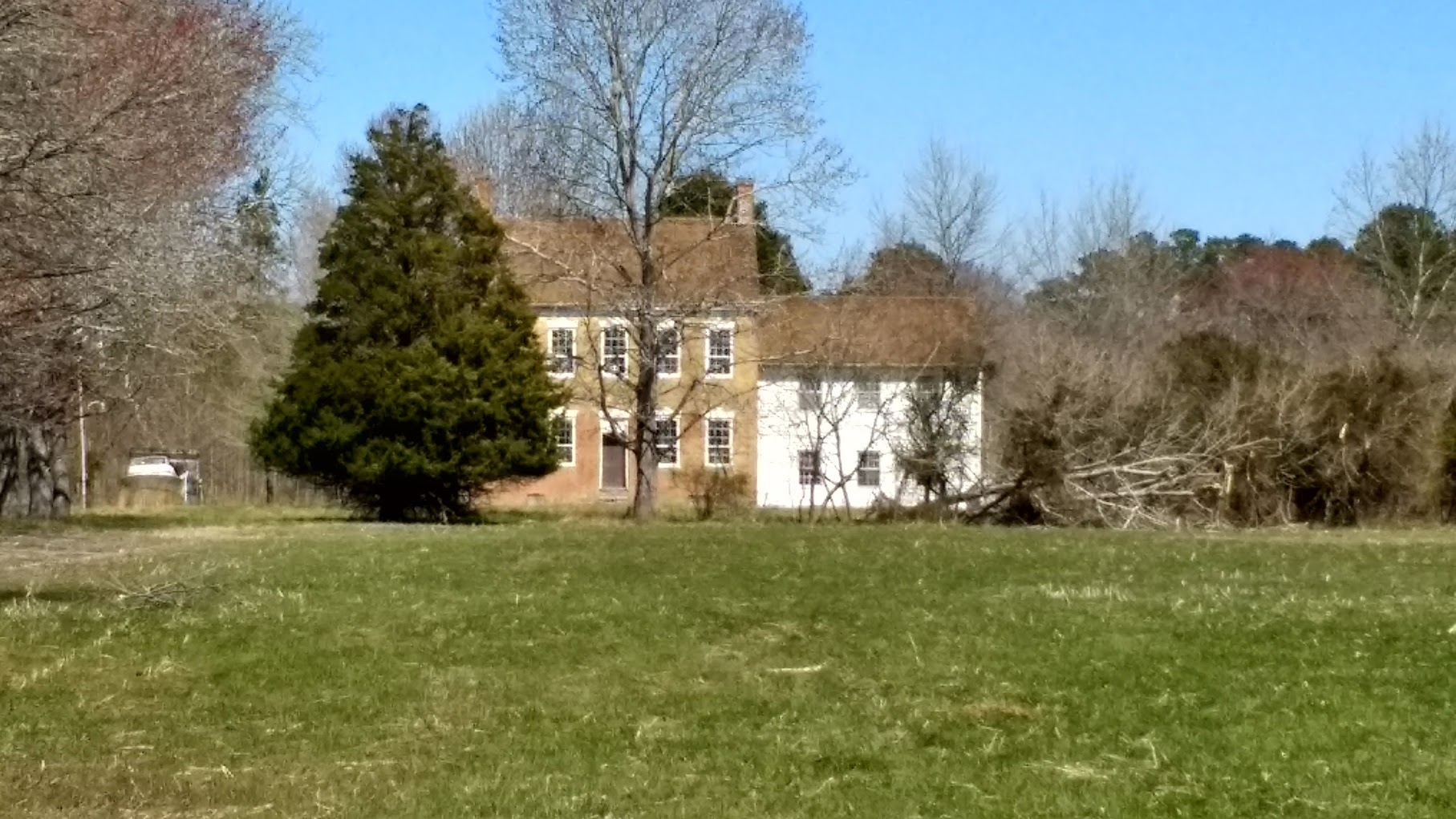

- Location within Maryland Location within the United States
- Location: 22342 Capitola Road (MD 352), Bivalve, Maryland
- Coordinates: 38°18′7″N 75°50′25″W
- Area: 4 acres (1.6 ha)
- Built: c. 1810
- Architectural style: Federal
- NRHP reference No.: 78001489
- Added to NRHP: May 22, 1978

The Yellow Brick House, or Moorfield, is a historic home located at Bivalve, Wicomico County, Maryland, United States. It is a Federal-style two story brick dwelling built about 1810. The house is one of the largest Federal-style dwellings left in Wicomico County.

The Yellow Brick House was listed on the National Register of Historic Places in 1978.
