= Waterview, Maryland =

Waterview
- Census-designated place
- Location within the state of Maryland Waterview (the United States)
- Coordinates: 38°14′49″N 75°54′11″W
- Country: United States
- State: Maryland
- County: Wicomico

Area
  - Total: 0.49 sq mi (1.28 km^{2})
  - Land: 0.49 sq mi (1.27 km^{2})
  - Water: 0.0039 sq mi (0.01 km^{2})
- Elevation: 7 ft (2.1 m)

Population (2020)
  - Total: 32
  - Density: 65.2/sq mi (25.17/km^{2})
- Time zone: UTC−5 (Eastern (EST))
  - Summer (DST): UTC−4 (EDT)
- ZIP code: 21840
- Area codes: 410 & 443
- FIPS code: 24-81925
- GNIS feature ID: 591501

Waterview is an unincorporated community and census-designated place in Wicomico County, Maryland, United States. Its population was 40 as of the 2010 census. It is part of the Salisbury, Maryland-Delaware Metropolitan Statistical Area.

== Demographics ==
Historical population
Census	Pop.	Note	%±
2010	40		—
2020	32		−20.0%
U.S. Decennial Census
