= Airey, Maryland =

Human settlement in Maryland, United States of America

Coordinates: 38°31′22″N 075°59′34″W

Airey (also known as Aireys) is a populated place in Dorchester County, Maryland, United States.
