= Coral Hills, Maryland =

- Census-designated place
- Location of Coral Hills, Maryland
- Coordinates: 38°52′20″N 76°55′41″W
- Country: United States
- State: Maryland
- County: Prince George's

Area
  - Total: 1.64 sq mi (4.24 km^{2})
  - Land: 1.63 sq mi (4.23 km^{2})
  - Water: 0.0039 sq mi (0.01 km^{2})
- Elevation: 292 ft (89 m)

Population (2020)
  - Total: 9,997
  - Density: 6,122.5/sq mi (2,363.92/km^{2})
- Time zone: UTC−5 (Eastern (EST))
  - Summer (DST): UTC−4 (EDT)
- FIPS code: 24-19825
- GNIS feature ID: 0597280

Coral Hills is an unincorporated area and census-designated place (CDP) in Prince George's County, Maryland, United States. As of the 2020 census, the population was 9,997.

== Geography ==
Coral Hills is located at 38°52′20″N 76°55′41″W (38.872312, −76.928010).

According to the United States Census Bureau, the CDP has a total area of 1.5 square miles (3.9 km^{2}), all land.

== Demographics ==
Historical population
Census	Pop.	Note	%±
2000	10,720		—
2010	9,895		−7.7%
2020	9,997		1.0%
U.S. Decennial Census; 2010 2020

=== Racial and ethnic composition ===
Coral Hills CDP, Maryland – Racial and ethnic composition Note: the US Census treats Hispanic/Latino as an ethnic category. This table excludes Latinos from the racial categories and assigns them to a separate category. Hispanics/Latinos may be of any race.
Race / Ethnicity (NH = Non-Hispanic)	Pop 2000	Pop 2010	Pop 2020	% 2000	% 2010	% 2020
White alone (NH)	348	225	140	3.25%	2.27%	1.40%
Black or African American alone (NH)	9,980	8,830	8,062	93.10%	89.24%	80.64%
Native American or Alaska Native alone (NH)	47	29	23	0.44%	0.29%	0.23%
Asian alone (NH)	55	27	60	0.51%	0.27%	0.60%
Native Hawaiian or Pacific Islander alone (NH)	5	1	3	0.05%	0.01%	0.03%
Other race alone (NH)	17	13	52	0.16%	0.13%	0.52%
Mixed race or Multiracial (NH)	134	169	253	1.25%	1.71%	2.53%
Hispanic or Latino (any race)	134	601	1,404	1.25%	6.07%	14.04%
Total	10,720	9,895	9,997	100.00%	100.00%	100.00%

=== 2020 census ===
As of the 2020 census, Coral Hills had a population of 9,997. The median age was 37.3 years. 22.3% of residents were under the age of 18 and 13.1% of residents were 65 years of age or older. For every 100 females there were 86.5 males, and for every 100 females age 18 and over there were 84.0 males age 18 and over.

100.0% of residents lived in urban areas, while 0.0% lived in rural areas.

There were 3,753 households in Coral Hills, of which 30.3% had children under the age of 18 living in them. Of all households, 24.8% were married-couple households, 24.2% were households with a male householder and no spouse or partner present, and 43.8% were households with a female householder and no spouse or partner present. About 30.4% of all households were made up of individuals and 9.0% had someone living alone who was 65 years of age or older.

There were 3,954 housing units, of which 5.1% were vacant. The homeowner vacancy rate was 2.6% and the rental vacancy rate was 3.9%.

=== 2000 census ===
As of the census of 2000, there were 10,720 people, 3,833 households, and 2,694 families residing in the CDP. The population density was 7,046.6 inhabitants per square mile (2,720.7/km^{2}). There were 4,177 housing units at an average density of 2,745.7 per square mile (1,060.1/km^{2}). The racial makeup of the CDP was 3.59% White, 93.56% African American, 0.49% Native American, 0.51% Asian, 0.05% Pacific Islander, 0.45% from other races, and 1.34% from two or more races. Hispanic or Latino of any race were 1.25% of the population.

There were 3,833 households, out of which 35.2% had children under the age of 18 living with them, 31.3% were married couples living together, 30.9% had a female householder with no husband present, and 29.7% were non-families. 23.9% of all households were made up of individuals, and 3.3% had someone living alone who was 65 years of age or older. The average household size was 2.80 and the average family size was 3.31.

In the CDP, the population was spread out, with 30.7% under the age of 18, 9.8% from 18 to 24, 31.1% from 25 to 44, 21.9% from 45 to 64, and 6.5% who were 65 years of age or older. The median age was 32 years. For every 100 females, there were 88.2 males. For every 100 females age 18 and over, there were 84.0 males.

The median income for a household in the CDP was $41,122, and the median income for a family was $45,288. Males had a median income of $30,799 versus $30,466 for females. The per capita income for the CDP was $17,876. About 9.2% of families and 12.1% of the population were below the poverty line, including 13.3% of those under age 18 and 11.8% of those age 65 or over.

== Education ==
Coral Hills is a part of the Prince George's County Public Schools system.

Zoned elementary schools for the CDP are Bradbury Heights, Doswell Brooks, Concord, and William Hall. Zoned middle schools for the CDP are Drew-Freeman, William Hall, and Walker Mill. All residents are zoned to Suitland High School. William Hall was previously an elementary school but was scheduled to convert into being a K-8 in 2009.

John Edgar Howard Elementary was previously in Coral Hills CDP. It was scheduled to close in 2009. The facility is now used as the John E. Howard Community Center.

== Parks and recreation ==
The Prince George's County Department of Parks and Recreation operates the John E. Howard Community Center, the former John E. Howard Elementary School. It includes an athletic field, a game room, a gymnasium, a playground, and a tennis court. It also has a kitchen, a multipurpose area, and a picnic facility with tables.
