= Abell, Maryland =

Unincorporated community in St. Mary's County, Maryland, United States

Abell
- Unincorporated community
- Location within the state of Maryland Abell (the United States)
- Coordinates: 38°15′15″N 76°44′37″W
- Country: United States
- State: Maryland
- County: St. Mary's
- Elevation: 13 ft (4.0 m)
- Time zone: UTC−5 (Eastern (EST))
  - Summer (DST): UTC−4 (EDT)

Abell is an unincorporated community in what is familiarly called the "Seventh District" of St. Mary's County, Maryland, United States. Abell was a brewing ground for many fisherman and farmers in the late 19th century until approximately the late 1950s. Abell was known for its many major ports, and for its deep water access which made it easy for large steamboats to maneuver. Many of the ports have been demolished due to storms and hurricanes. Today, some local fisherman still reside in the same area where they were raised. Abell is also known for its century-old homes and views of the St. Clements Bay.
