= Upper Ferry (Wicomico River) =

Cable ferry in Eden, Maryland

- Locale: Eden, Maryland
- Waterway: Wicomico River
- Transit type: Passenger and automobile cable ferry
- Operator: Wicomico County Department of Public Works
- Began operation: 1688; 338 years ago
- No. of lines: 1
- No. of vessels: 1
- No. of terminals: 2

The Upper Ferry is a passenger and automobile cable ferry that crosses the Wicomico River in Eden, Maryland, located to the southwest of Salisbury. The ferry is operated by the Wicomico County Department of Public Works and runs between North Upper Ferry Road to the north and South Upper Ferry Road to the south. The ferry can carry a maximum of 6 passengers and 3 cars and has a weight limit of 10,000 pounds. The Upper Ferry operates from early morning until the evening every day of the year except county holidays, and is free. The ferry crossing takes about a minute and the ferry makes approximately 150 trips a day. In 2019, the ferry was overhauled and refurbished.

== Operating hours ==
- March 1 to May 15 : 7am–6pm
- May 16 to September 15 : 7am–7pm
- September 16 to October 31 : 7am–6pm
- November 1 to February 28 : 7am–5:30pm

The ferry closes daily at high and low tides. The ferry information hotline is 410-543-2765.
