= Wicomico River (Maryland eastern shore) =

Coordinates: 38°15′21″N 75°49′7″W

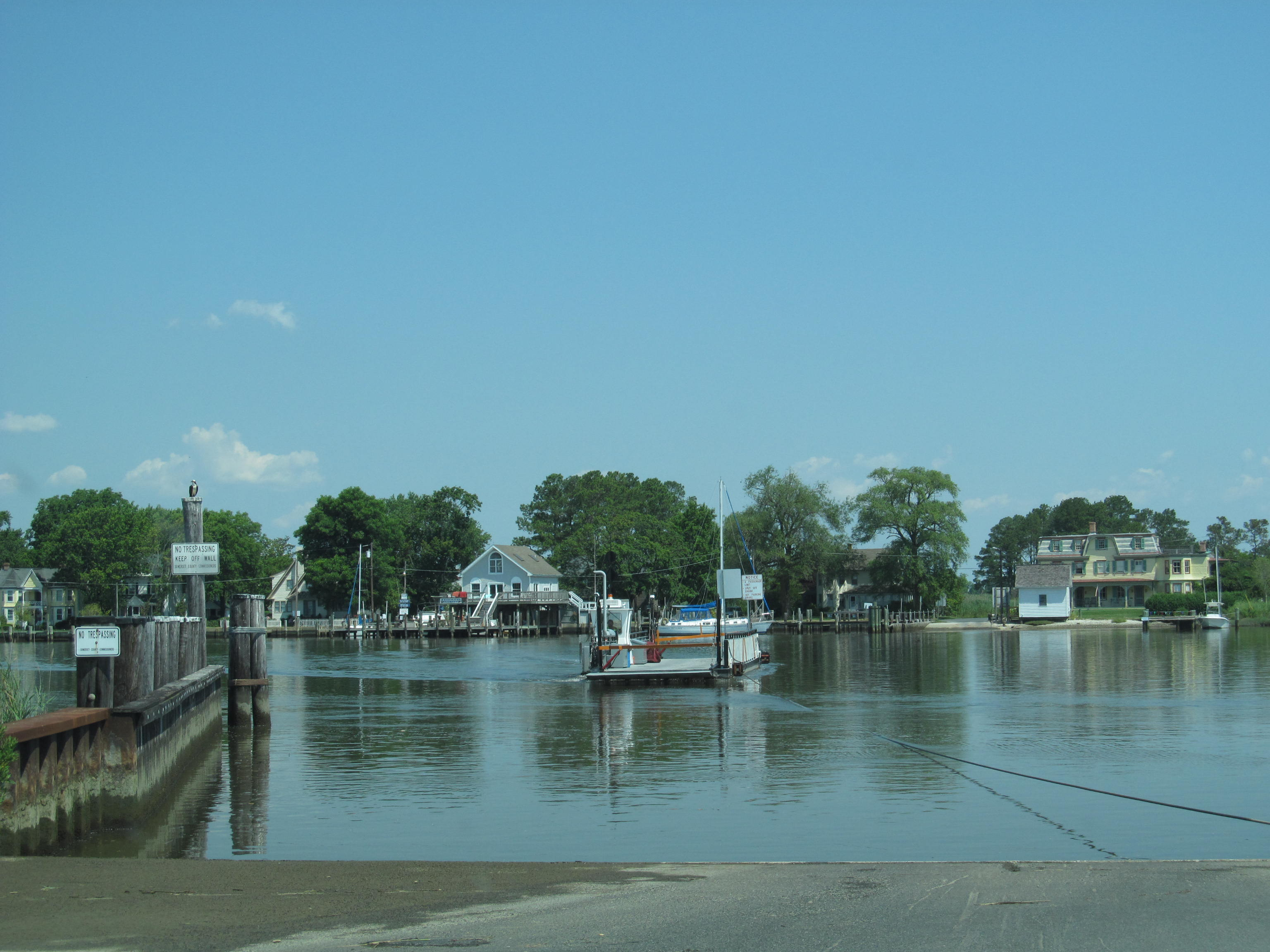
- The Wicomico River, looking towards Whitehaven from the ferry slip at the opposite bank.

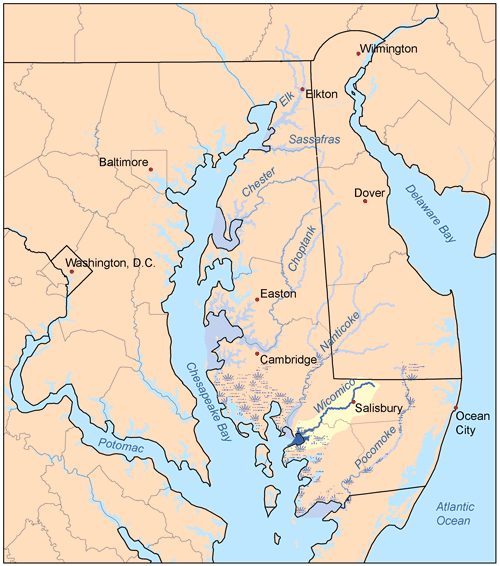
- Map of the rivers of the Eastern Shore of Maryland with the Wicomico and its watershed highlighted.
- Native name: Wicko mekee (Algonquian languages)

Location
- Country: United States
- State: Maryland
- Cities: Salisbury, Whitehaven

Physical characteristics
- Source
  - location: Delmar, Maryland
- Mouth: Chesapeake Bay
  - location: Mount Vernon, Maryland
- Length: 24.4 mi (39.3 km)

Basin features
- Tributaries
  - left: Beaverdam Creek, Wicomico Creek
  - right: Wood Creek, Rockawalking Creek

The Wicomico River (/waɪˈkɒmɪkoʊ/ wy-KOM-ik-oh) is a 24.4-mile-long (39.3 km) tributary of the Chesapeake Bay on the eastern shore of Maryland. It drains an area of low marshlands and farming country in the middle Delmarva Peninsula.

It rises in northern Wicomico County, close to the Delaware state line, and flows generally southwest, through Salisbury, its head of navigation is Monie Bay on the eastern edge of the Chesapeake Bay between Mt. Vernon and Waterview approximately 15 miles (24 km) southwest of Salisbury. The lower 20 miles (32 km) of the river form a tidal estuary.

The gentle free-flowing river is a popular destination for recreational canoeing and kayaking, as well as recreational fishing and crabbing. The river has also become a hotspot for water sports such as wakeboarding and water skiing due to its consistently smooth surface. Barge traffic on the river has made Salisbury the primary shipping point for goods on the Delmarva Peninsula over the last several centuries. Two automobile cable ferries cross the river at Whitehaven and Upper Ferry.

A civic group, the Wicomico Creekwatchers, have been testing water quality at 22 different points along the river since 2002. The City of Salisbury partners with Wicomico Creekwatchers, and provides funding. Their 2016 report, released in April 2017, showed that the water quality decreased compared to 2015, with higher levels of phosphorus, nitrogen, and bacteria.

== Etymology ==
The name Wicomico derives from the Nanticoke words wicko mekee, meaning "a place where houses are built," referring to a Native American village on the banks. The river shares the same name with the Wicomico River (a tributary of the Potomac River) in south-central Maryland.

== Tributaries ==
There are various tributaries and ponds which contribute to the Wicomico River.

- Beaverdam Creek
- Colbourne Mill Pond
- Johnson Pond
- Parker Pond
- Rockawalkin Creek
- Schumaker Pond
- Shiles Creek
- Tony Tank Pond
- Wicomico Creek
