= Quantico, Maryland =

Quantico
- Census-designated place
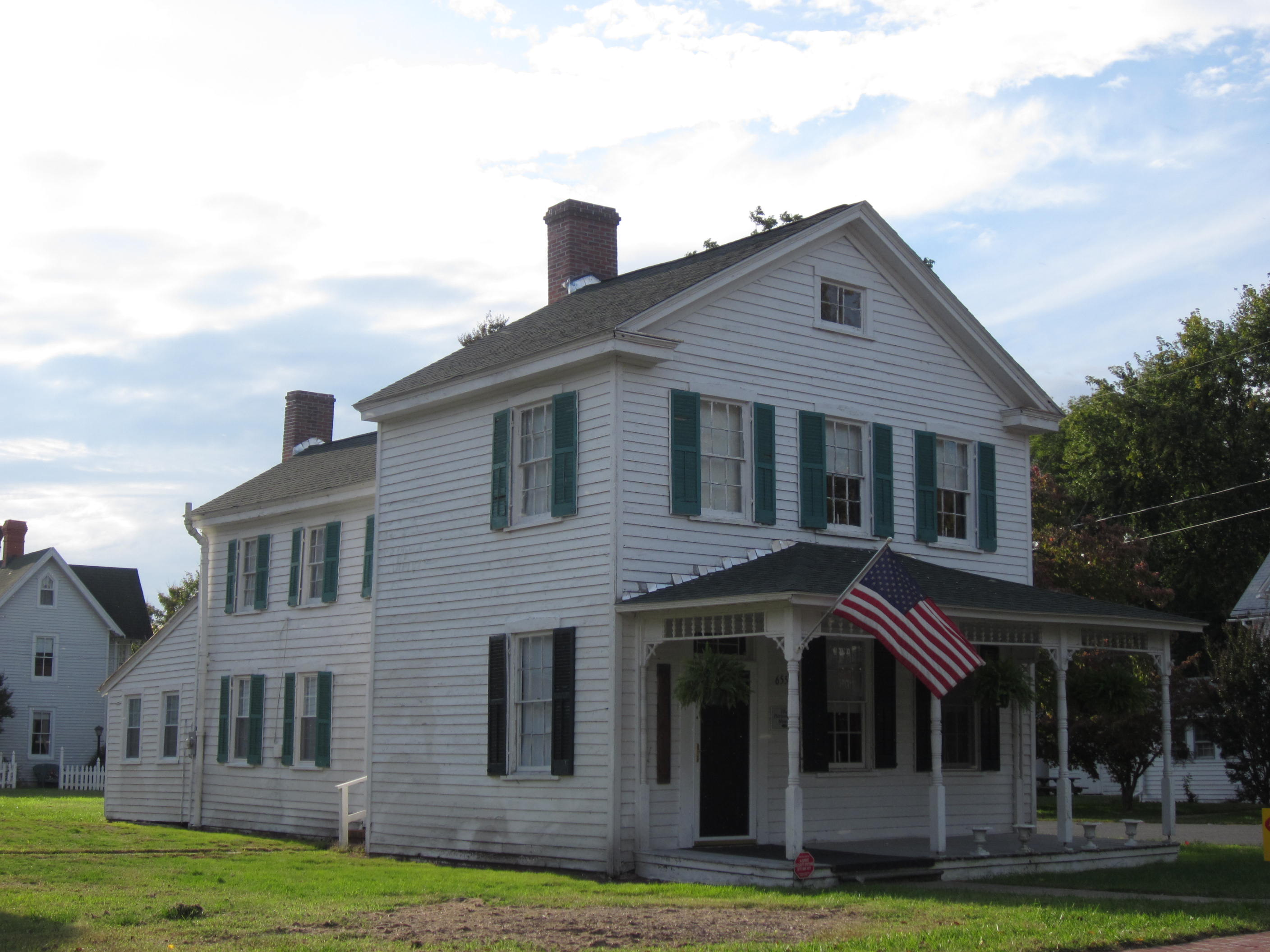
- House in Quantico

- Location within the state of Maryland Quantico (the United States)
- Coordinates: 38°22′27″N 75°44′33″W
- Country: United States
- State: Maryland
- County: Wicomico

Area
  - Total: 2.20 sq mi (5.70 km^{2})
  - Land: 2.10 sq mi (5.45 km^{2})
  - Water: 0.097 sq mi (0.25 km^{2})
- Elevation: 16 ft (4.9 m)

Population (2020)
  - Total: 148
  - Density: 70.3/sq mi (27.13/km^{2})
- Time zone: UTC−5 (Eastern (EST))
  - Summer (DST): UTC−4 (EDT)
- ZIP code: 21856
- Area codes: 410 & 443
- FIPS code: 24-64475
- GNIS feature ID: 591088

Quantico is an unincorporated community and census-designated place in Wicomico County, Maryland, United States, along the former stage route from Vienna to the port of Whitehaven on the Wicomico River. It consists of approximately 35 homes on the Quantico Creek. The community lies four miles (6 km) from Hebron along Maryland Route 347. There are two churches, a general store, and a post office in the community. It is part of the Salisbury, Maryland-Delaware Metropolitan Statistical Area.

As of the 2010 census, Quantico had a population of 133.

Quantico is a Native American name meaning "place of dancing".

The oldest home in Quantico is at 6508 Quantico Road. The house was built in 1790 with an addition added in 1810; the dates can be traced by the nails on the property. Built with brick and covered in stucco to imitate scored ashlar construction, the house had two exposed brick walls on the north and south sides. Today, the home does not face the street as it was built to face Quantico Creek, originally part of the property. The house and 3 acres (12,000 m^{2}) were sold in 1798 and purchased in January by Henry Crawford, a tanner, who gave the property the name Chelsea. Census records show that the house at the time had a log cookhouse, stable and meathouse, as well as other commercial buildings such as a tannery, shed, barkhouse and millhouse.

St. Bartholomew's Episcopal Church was listed on the National Register of Historic Places in 1975.

== Demographics ==
Historical population
Census	Pop.	Note	%±
2020	148		—
U.S. Decennial Census
