= Nanticoke, Maryland =

- Census-designated place
- Location within the state of Maryland Nanticoke, Maryland (the United States)
- Coordinates: 38°16′20″N 75°54′20″W
- Country: United States
- State: Maryland
- County: Wicomico

Area
  - Total: 2.64 sq mi (6.83 km^{2})
  - Land: 2.63 sq mi (6.80 km^{2})
  - Water: 0.0077 sq mi (0.02 km^{2})
- Elevation: 10 ft (3.0 m)
- Time zone: UTC−5 (Eastern (EST))
  - Summer (DST): UTC−4 (EDT)
- ZIP code: 21840
- Area codes: 410 & 443
- FIPS code: 24-54925
- GNIS feature ID: 590862

Nanticoke is an unincorporated community and census-designated place in Wicomico County, Maryland, United States. It is part of the Salisbury, Maryland-Delaware Metropolitan Statistical Area.

== Demographics ==
=== 2020 Census ===
Per the 2020 census, the population was 228.

Historical population
Census	Pop.	Note	%±
2010	167		—
2020	209		25.1%
U.S. Decennial Census

== See also ==
Roaring Point
