= Bivalve, Maryland =

Bivalve
- Census-designated place
- Location within the state of Maryland Bivalve (the United States)
- Coordinates: 38°18′22″N 75°53′21″W
- Country: United States
- State: Maryland
- County: Wicomico

Area
  - Total: 1.49 sq mi (3.87 km^{2})
  - Land: 1.46 sq mi (3.77 km^{2})
  - Water: 0.039 sq mi (0.10 km^{2})
- Elevation: 13 ft (4.0 m)

Population (2020)
  - Total: 185
  - Density: 127.2/sq mi (49.12/km^{2})
- Time zone: UTC−5 (Eastern (EST))
  - Summer (DST): UTC−4 (EDT)
- ZIP code: 21814
- Area codes: 410 & 443
- FIPS code: 24-07675
- GNIS feature ID: 589760

Bivalve is an unincorporated community and census-designated place along the eastern shore of the lower Nanticoke River, near its mouth on the Chesapeake Bay, in Wicomico County, Maryland, United States. Its population was 201 as of the 2010 census. Bivalve takes its name from the oyster, upon which the town's economy once depended. It is part of the Salisbury, Maryland-Delaware Metropolitan Statistical Area.

The Yellow Brick House was listed on the National Register of Historic Places in 1978.

== Demographics ==
Historical population
Census	Pop.	Note	%±
2020	185		—
U.S. Decennial Census
