= Whitehaven Ferry =

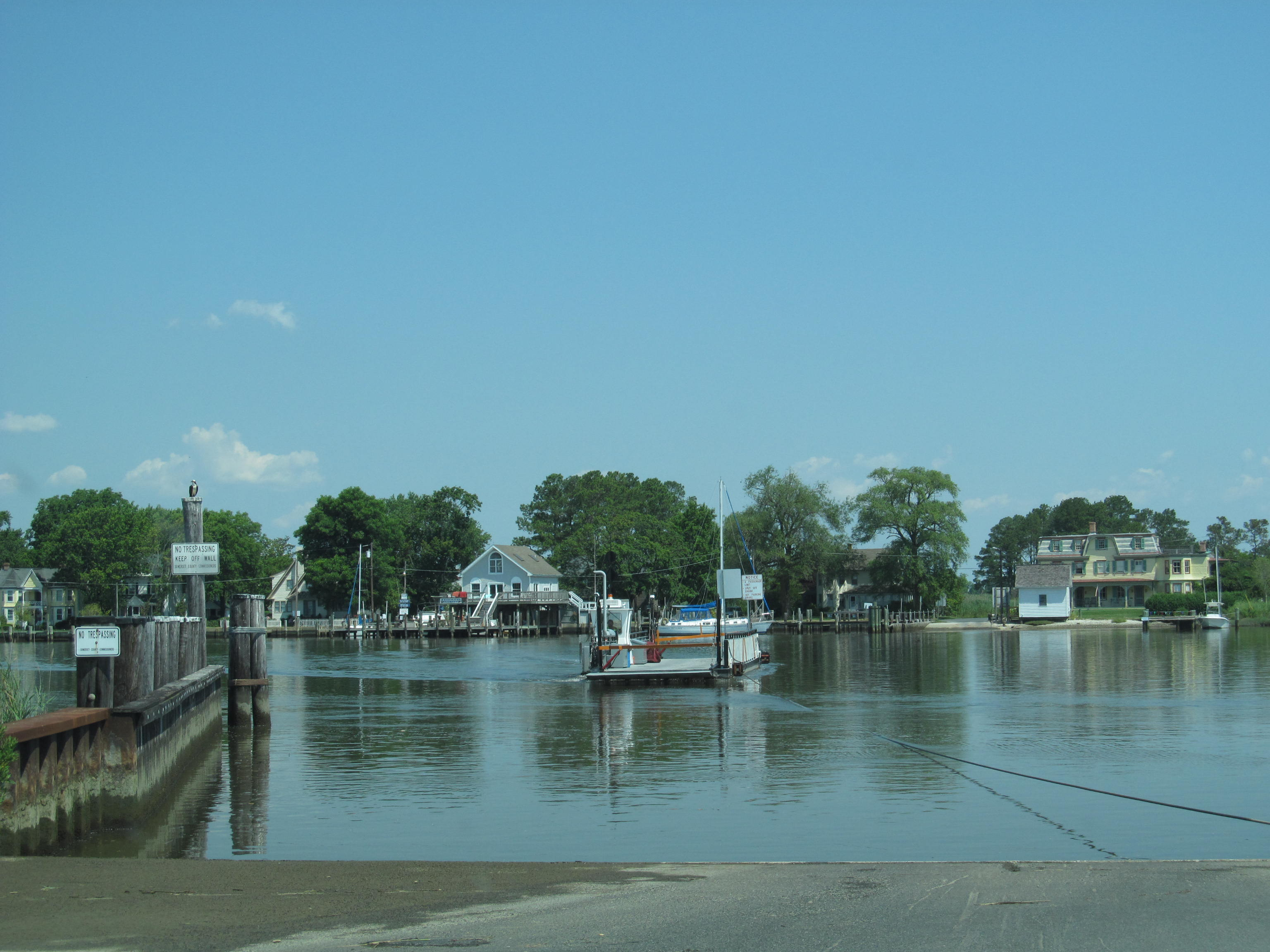
- Ferry crossing
- Locale: Whitehaven, Maryland
- Waterway: Wicomico River
- Transit type: Passenger and automobile cable ferry
- Operator: Wicomico County Department of Public Works
- Began operation: 1687
- No. of lines: 1
- No. of terminals: 2

The Whitehaven Ferry is a passenger and automobile cable ferry that crosses the Wicomico River in Whitehaven, Maryland, located to the southwest of Salisbury. The ferry is operated by the Wicomico County Department of Public Works and runs between the community of Whitehaven in Wicomico County to the north and Somerset County in the south. The ferry can carry a maximum of 6 passengers and 3 cars and has a weight limit of 10,000 pounds. The Whitehaven Ferry operates from early morning until the evening every day of the year except Christmas and is free. A ferry has crossed the Wicomico River in the area since 1687. In 2012, the ferry was overhauled and refurbished.

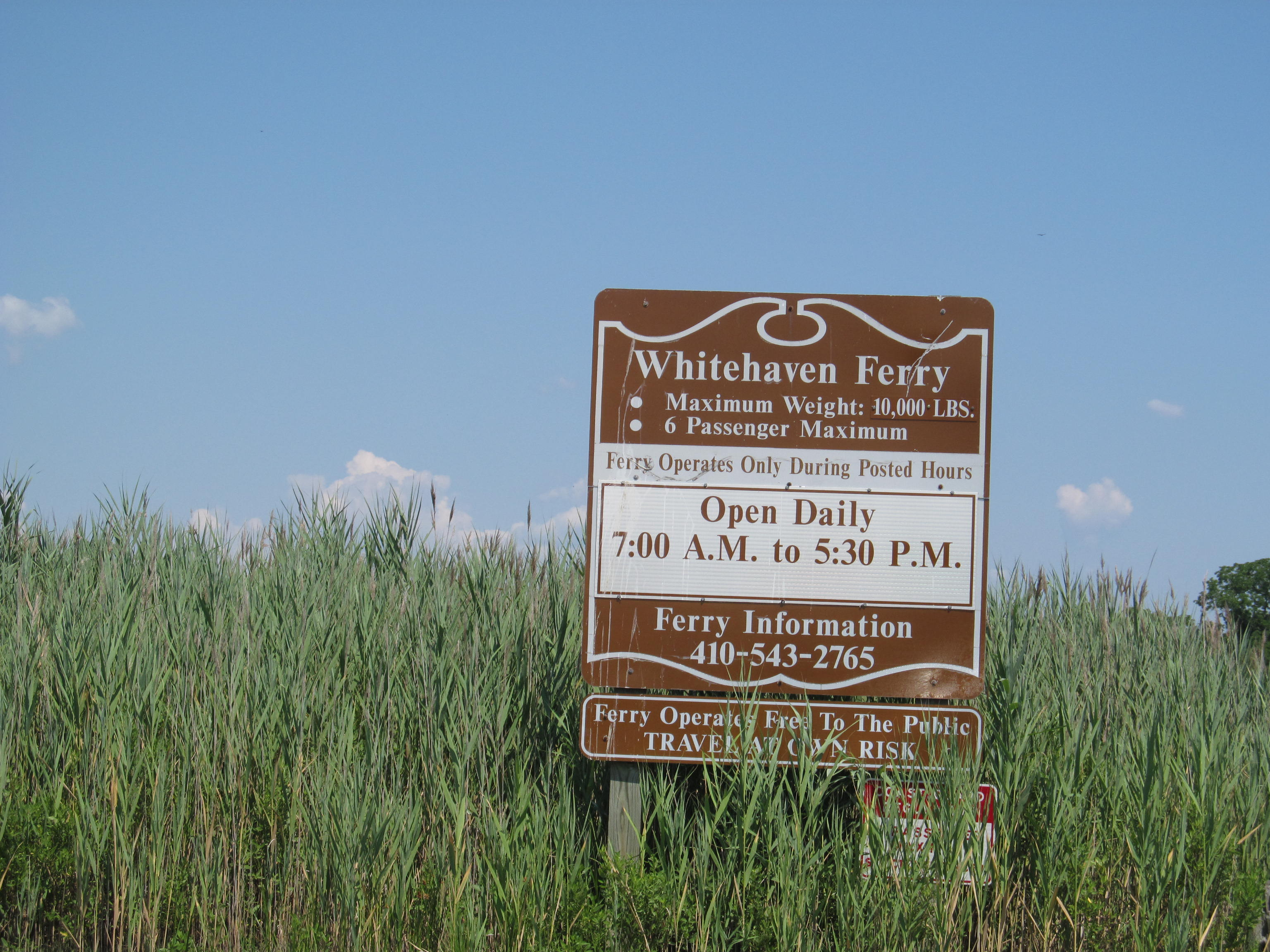
Ferry sign
