= Whitehaven, Maryland =

Whitehaven
- Census-designated place
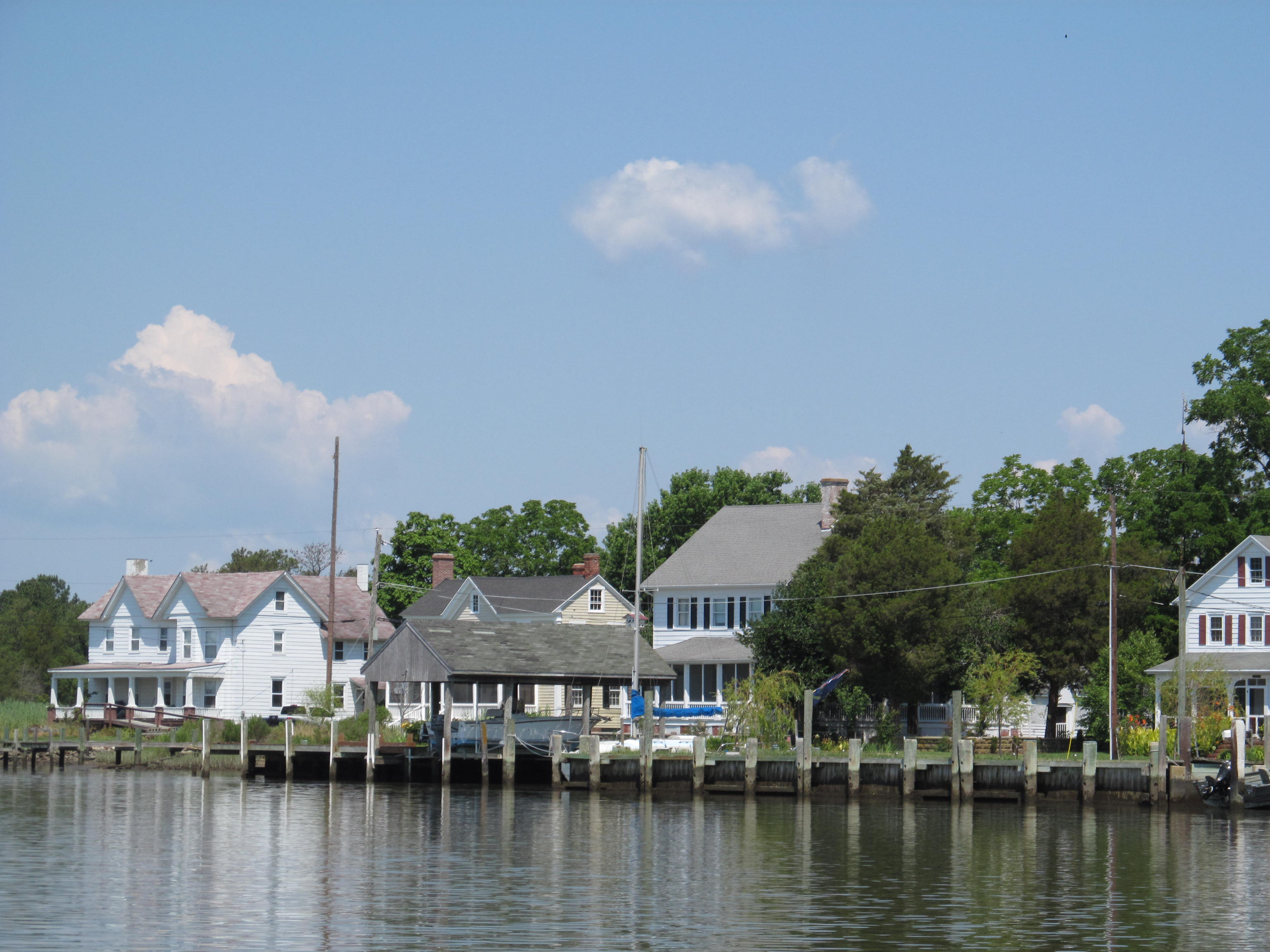
- Houses along the Wicomico River in Whitehaven

- Location within the state of Maryland Whitehaven (the United States)
- Coordinates: 38°16′09″N 75°47′28″W
- Country: United States
- State: Maryland
- County: Wicomico

Area
  - Total: 0.37 sq mi (0.96 km^{2})
  - Land: 0.37 sq mi (0.96 km^{2})
  - Water: 0.0039 sq mi (0.01 km^{2})
- Elevation: 3 ft (0.91 m)

Population (2020)
  - Total: 46
  - Density: 125/sq mi (48.1/km^{2})
- Time zone: UTC−5 (Eastern (EST))
  - Summer (DST): UTC−4 (EDT)
- ZIP code: 21856
- Area codes: 410 & 443
- FIPS code: 24-84225
- GNIS feature ID: 588219

Whitehaven is an unincorporated community and census-designated place in Wicomico County, Maryland, United States. Its population was 43 as of the 2010 census. It is part of the Salisbury, Maryland-Delaware Metropolitan Statistical Area.

Whitehaven is home to the Whitehaven Ferry, one of the few remaining public ferries in Maryland, and was once a thriving settlement which included stores, a shipyard, and the Whitehaven Hotel. It is the location of the Whitehaven Historic District. The ferry runs between Whitehaven and Mt. Vernon, Somerset County and takes approximately 5 minutes to make a crossing.

The Whitehaven Historic District and Whitehaven Hotel are listed on the National Register of Historic Places.

== Demographics ==
Historical population
Census	Pop.	Note	%±
2020	46		—
U.S. Decennial Census
