= National Register of Historic Places listings in Worcester County, Maryland =

Location of Worcester County in Maryland

This is a list of the National Register of Historic Places listings in Worcester County, Maryland.

This is intended to be a complete list of the properties and districts on the National Register of Historic Places in Worcester County, Maryland, United States. Latitude and longitude coordinates are provided for many National Register properties and districts; these locations may be seen together in a map.

There are 36 properties and districts listed on the National Register in the county.

Contents: Counties in Maryland
Allegany - Anne Arundel - Baltimore (city) - Baltimore County - Calvert - Caroline - Carroll - Cecil - Charles - Dorchester - Frederick - Garrett - Harford - Howard - Kent - Montgomery - Prince George's - Queen Anne's - Somerset - St. Mary's - Talbot - Washington - Wicomico - Worcester

This National Park Service list is complete through NPS recent listings posted May 1, 2026.

== Current listings ==
| | Name on the Register | Image | Date listed | Location | City or town | Description |
|---|---|---|---|---|---|---|
| 1 | All Hallows Episcopal Church | All Hallows Episcopal Church | August 6, 1979 (#79001148) | 101 N. Church St. 38°10′32″N 75°23′43″W | Snow Hill | |
| 2 | Berlin Commercial District | Berlin Commercial District | April 17, 1980 (#80001844) | Main, Broad, Williams, Bay, Pitts, and Commerce Sts. 38°19′29″N 75°13′09″W | Berlin | |
| 3 | Beverly | | October 29, 1975 (#75000933) | 4.5 miles southwest of Pocomoke City off Cedarhall Rd. 38°00′29″N 75°37′03″W | Pocomoke City | |
| 4 | Buckingham Archeological Site | Buckingham Archeological Site | February 24, 1975 (#75000930) | Address Restricted | Berlin | |
| 5 | Burley Manor | Burley Manor | July 7, 1974 (#74000979) | 3 S. Main St. 38°19′10″N 75°13′10″W | Berlin | |
| 6 | Caleb's Discovery | Caleb's Discovery | May 27, 1975 (#75000931) | 2 miles west of Berlin on U.S. Route 50; 38°20′00″N 75°12′30″W | Berlin | |
| 7 | Chanceford | Chanceford | September 2, 1994 (#94001077) | 209 W. Federal St. 38°10′22″N 75°23′48″W | Snow Hill | |
| 8 | Littleton T. Clarke House | Littleton T. Clarke House | May 2, 1996 (#96000519) | 407 2nd St. 38°04′16″N 75°34′10″W | Pocomoke City | |
| 9 | Costen House | Costen House | December 6, 1975 (#75000934) | 206 Market St. 38°04′29″N 75°34′04″W | Pocomoke City | |
| 10 | Captain Robert S. Craig Cottage | Captain Robert S. Craig Cottage | December 26, 2017 (#100001929) | 706 St. Louis Ave. 38°20′22″N 75°05′05″W | Ocean City | |
| 11 | Crockett House | Crockett House | March 21, 1996 (#96000299) | 900 Market St. 38°04′09″N 75°33′33″W | Pocomoke City | |
| 12 | Delaware Boundary Markers | | February 18, 1975 (#75002101) | Boundary line dividing Delaware from Maryland and Pennsylvania | Multiple | Extends into Delaware and southeastern Pennsylvania. |
| 13 | Fassitt House | | August 22, 1996 (#96000921) | 12025 Fassitt Ln. 38°17′09″N 75°08′47″W | Berlin | |
| 14 | Old Friendship United Methodist Church | Old Friendship United Methodist Church | January 4, 1996 (#95001490) | Meadow Bridge Rd. 38°13′25″N 75°35′13″W | Snow Hill | |
| 15 | Genesar | Genesar | September 17, 1971 (#71000381) | Southeast of Berlin on Maryland Route 611 off U.S. Route 50; 38°14′07″N 75°11′22″W | Berlin | |
| 16 | Samuel Gunn House | Samuel Gunn House | December 27, 2002 (#02001594) | 200 W. Market St. 38°10′32″N 75°23′46″W | Snow Hill | |
| 17 | Henry's Grove | Henry's Grove | September 13, 1984 (#84001891) | Maryland Route 611; 38°16′10″N 75°09′01″W | Berlin | |
| 18 | Makemie Memorial Presbyterian Church | Makemie Memorial Presbyterian Church | November 10, 2008 (#08001044) | 103 W. Market St. 38°10′38″N 75°23′37″W | Snow Hill | |
| 19 | Mansion House | Mansion House | January 19, 1995 (#94001643) | Bayside Rd. 38°08′54″N 75°17′15″W | Public Landing | |
| 20 | Mar-Va Theater | Mar-Va Theater | March 21, 1996 (#96000301) | 103 Market St. 38°04′33″N 75°34′09″W | Pocomoke City | |
| 21 | James Martin House | James Martin House | August 22, 1996 (#96000922) | 207 Ironshire St. 38°10′16″N 75°23′39″W | Snow Hill | |
| 22 | Merry Sherwood | Merry Sherwood | September 20, 1991 (#91001420) | 8909 Worcester Highway; 38°18′20″N 75°13′23″W | Berlin | |
| 23 | Nassawango Iron Furnace Site | Nassawango Iron Furnace Site | October 31, 1975 (#75000935) | On Old Furnace Road, northwest of Snow Hill off Maryland Route 12; 38°12′15″N 75°28′08″W | Snow Hill | |
| 24 | Nun's Green | | September 20, 1979 (#79003263) | South of Snow Hill on Cherrix Rd. 38°07′49″N 75°22′57″W | Snow Hill | |
| 25 | Pocomoke City Historic District | Pocomoke City Historic District | December 23, 2004 (#04001383) | Market, Cedar, 2nd, Clarke, and Bridge Sts. and Linden Ave. 38°04′24″N 75°33′57″W | Pocomoke City | |
| 26 | Pocomoke River Bridge | Pocomoke River Bridge | May 28, 2025 (#100011896) | US 13 Business/Market Street over Pocomoke River; 38°04′35″N 75°34′16″W | Pocomoke City | Also a contributing property of the Pocomoke City Historic District. |
| 27 | George Washington Purnell House | George Washington Purnell House | August 22, 1996 (#96000920) | 201 E. Market St. 38°10′40″N 75°23′33″W | Snow Hill | |
| 28 | Queponco Railway Station | Queponco Railway Station | January 19, 1996 (#95001546) | 2378 Patey Woods Rd. 38°15′05″N 75°17′34″W | Newark | |
| 29 | Sandy Point Site | Sandy Point Site | April 28, 1975 (#75000932) | Address Restricted | Ocean City | |
| 30 | Simpson's Grove | Simpson's Grove | August 30, 1996 (#96000949) | Eastern side of Downs Rd., approximately 2 miles southwest of the junction of U.S. Routes 50 and 113; 38°16′42″N 75°14′53″W | Ironshire | |
| 31 | Gov. John Walter Smith House | Gov. John Walter Smith House | September 15, 1994 (#94001146) | 104 S. Church St. 38°10′23″N 75°23′41″W | Snow Hill | |
| 32 | St. Martins Church | St. Martins Church | April 13, 1977 (#77000707) | 1 mile south of Showell at the junction of U.S. Route 113 and Maryland Route 589; 38°23′34″N 75°12′18″W | Showell | |
| 33 | Snow Hill Drawbridge | Snow Hill Drawbridge | May 28, 2025 (#100011897) | MD 12/ North Washington Street over Pocomoke River. 38°10′44″N 75°23′40″W | Snow Hill | |
| 34 | St. Paul's by-the-sea Protestant Episcopal Church | St. Paul's by-the-sea Protestant Episcopal Church | October 22, 2008 (#08001013) | 302 N. Baltimore St. 38°20′05″N 75°05′05″W | Ocean City | |
| 35 | Williams Grove | | August 22, 1996 (#96000919) | 11842 Porfin Dr. 38°15′40″N 75°09′16″W | Berlin | |
| 36 | Young-Sartorius House | Young-Sartorius House | August 30, 1996 (#96000948) | 405 Market St. 38°04′25″N 75°33′57″W | Pocomoke City | |

== See also ==
- List of National Historic Landmarks in Maryland
- National Register of Historic Places listings in Maryland
