= Maryland Route 611 =

Highway in Maryland

Maryland Route 611
- Stephen Decatur Highway
- Maryland Route 611 highlighted in red

Route information
- Maintained by MDSHA
- Length: 8.51 mi (13.70 km)
- Existed: 1935–present
- Tourist routes: Cape to Cape Scenic Byway

Major junctions
- South end: Assateague State Park on Assateague Island
- MD 376 at Lewis Corner; MD 707 in West Ocean City
- North end: US 50 in West Ocean City

Location
- Country: United States
- State: Maryland
- Counties: Worcester

Highway system
- Maryland highway system; Interstate; US; State; Scenic Byways
| ← MD 610 | → MD 614 |

Maryland Route 611 (MD 611) is a state highway in the U.S. state of Maryland. Known as Stephen Decatur Highway, the state highway runs 8.51 miles (13.70 km) from Assateague Island north to U.S. Route 50 (US 50) in West Ocean City. MD 611 is named for Stephen Decatur, the U.S. naval officer of the early 19th century who was born in nearby Berlin. The state highway provides access to Assateague State Park and Assateague Island National Seashore via the Verrazano Bridge named for Giovanni da Verrazzano. MD 611 was first paved in West Ocean City in the mid-1930s. The highway was extended south to MD 376 at Lewis Corner in the 1940s. A ferry crossed Sinepuxent Bay to Assateague Island from the southern end of the county highway that continued south from Lewis Corner until MD 611 was extended across the Verrazano Bridge in the mid-1960s.

== Route description ==
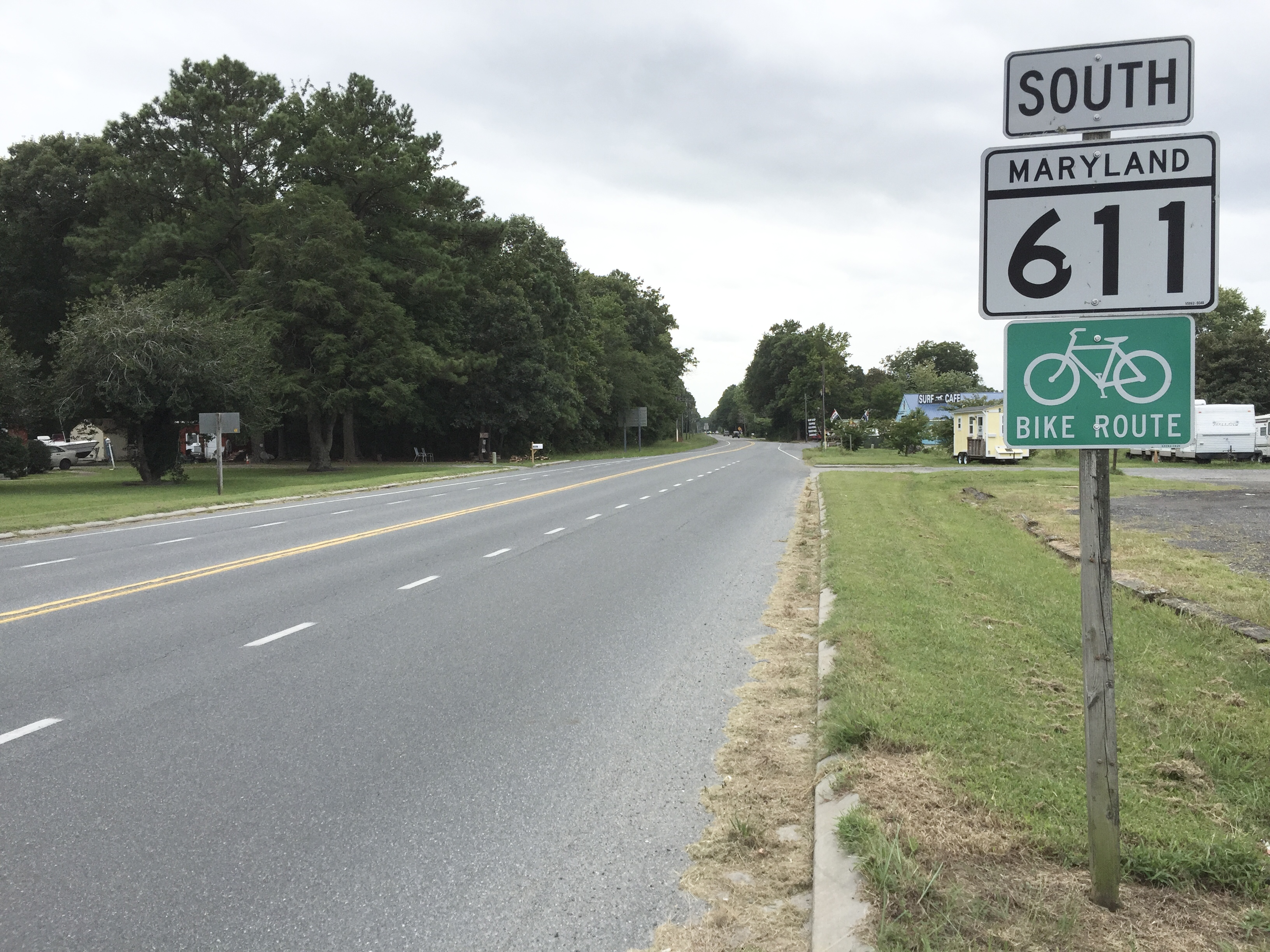
View south along MD 611 at MD 376 in Lewis Corner

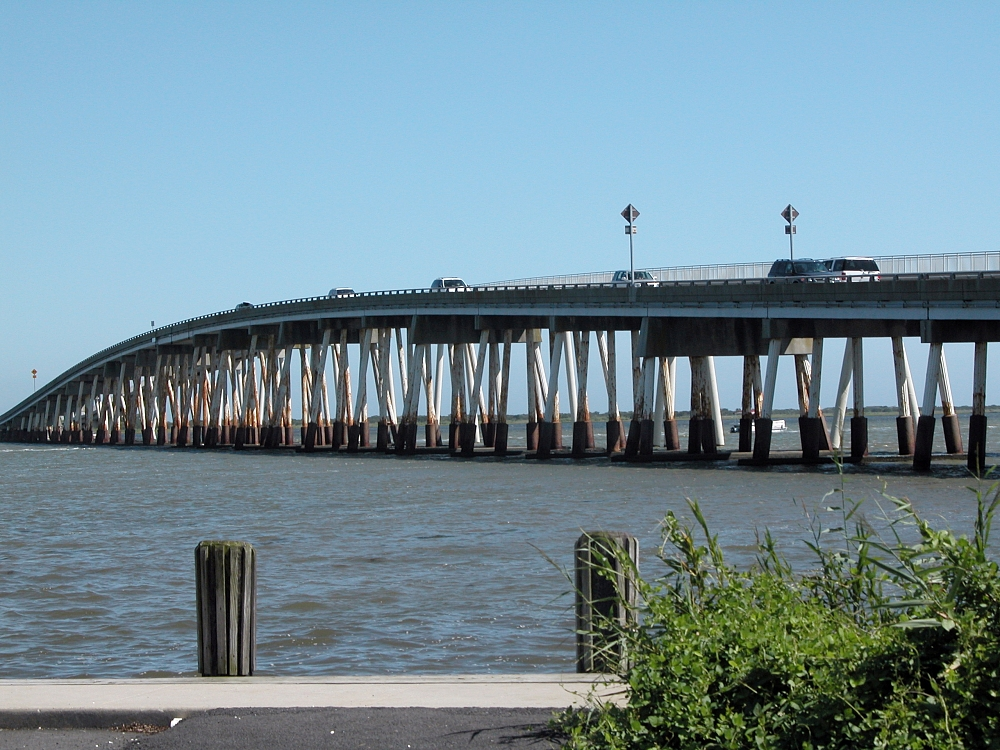
The Verrazano Bridge, which carries MD 611 over the Sinepuxent Bay between the mainland and Assateague Island

MD 611 begins at the parking lot of Assateague State Park on Assateague Island. The state highway immediately intersects Bayberry Road, which is the access road to Assateague Island National Seashore. MD 611 heads northwest as a two-lane undivided road and crosses Sinepuxent Bay on the Verrazano Bridge flanked to the south by a pedestrian bridge. Upon reaching Sinepuxent Neck, the state highway passes the Assateague Island National Seashore visitor center on the southbound side before it curves to the northeast and intersects South Point Road, which leads to Rum Pointe Golf Course and the Ocean City Golf and Yacht Club. MD 611 passes the entrance to the historic homes Williams Grove and Henry's Grove before passing through the hamlet of Lewis Corner. In Lewis Corner, the state highway intersects the eastern terminus of MD 376 (Assateague Road), and passes Frontier Town Amusement Park and another historic home, Fassitt House. MD 611 continues northeast, with residential and commercial development increasing as the highway passes west of the Ocean City Municipal Airport and enters West Ocean City. After passing the eastern terminus of MD 707 (Old Bridge Road), the state highway expands to four lanes shortly before reaching its northern terminus at US 50 (Ocean Gateway). MD 611 serves as the access road to the Maryland section of Assateague Island, with traffic from points north and west using the route south of MD 376.

== History ==
MD 611 was paved from US 213 (now MD 707) to near the Sinepuxent Road intersection on the southern end of West Ocean City by 1935. By 1946, the state highway extended north to the US 213 divided highway and south to MD 376 at Lewis Corner. A ferry began service between the southern end of South Point Road and Assateague Island in 1957; this ferry reached the island at what is now Ferry Landing Road. The ferry was discontinued following the completion of the Verrazano Bridge in 1964. MD 611 was extended south from Lewis Corner to the eastern end of the Verrazano Bridge in 1967. The state highway was extended south along Bayberry Road to Ferry Landing Road in 1969 but was retracted to its present southern terminus by 1995.

== Junction list ==
The entire route is in Worcester County.

| Location | mi | km | Destinations | Notes |
|---|---|---|---|---|
| Assateague Island | 0.00 | 0.00 | Entrance to Assateague State Park | Southern terminus |
| Assateague Island | 0.09 | 0.14 | Bayberry Drive south – Assateague Island National Seashore | |
| Sinepuxent Bay | 0.72– 1.03 | 1.16– 1.66 | Verrazano Bridge | |
| Lewis Corner | 4.49 | 7.23 | MD 376 west (Assateague Road) to US 50 west – Berlin, Bay Bridge | Eastern terminus of MD 376 |
| West Ocean City | 8.16 | 13.13 | MD 707 west (Old Bridge Road) / Old Bridge Road east | Eastern terminus of MD 707 |
| West Ocean City | 8.51 | 13.70 | US 50 (Ocean Gateway) – Salisbury, Ocean City | Northern terminus |
1.000 mi = 1.609 km; 1.000 km = 0.621 mi
