= Maryland Route 818 =

Highway in Maryland

Maryland Route 818
- Main Street
- Maryland Route 818 highlighted in red

Route information
- Maintained by MDSHA
- Length: 2.62 mi (4.22 km)
- Existed: 1957–present
- Tourist routes: Cape to Cape Scenic Byway

Major junctions
- South end: US 113 south of Berlin
- MD 376 in Berlin; MD 374 in Berlin; MD 346 in Berlin; US 50 in Berlin
- North end: US 113 north of Berlin

Location
- Country: United States
- State: Maryland
- Counties: Worcester

Highway system
- Maryland highway system; Interstate; US; State; Scenic Byways
← MD 817	→ MD 819

Maryland Route 818 (MD 818) is a state highway in the U.S. state of Maryland. Known as Main Street, the state highway runs 2.62 miles (4.22 km) between two intersections with U.S. Route 113 (US 113) on the north and south sides of Berlin in Worcester County. MD 818 is the original 1927 alignment of US 113 through Berlin. The state highway was designated shortly after US 113's bypass of Berlin was completed in the late 1950s.

== Route description ==
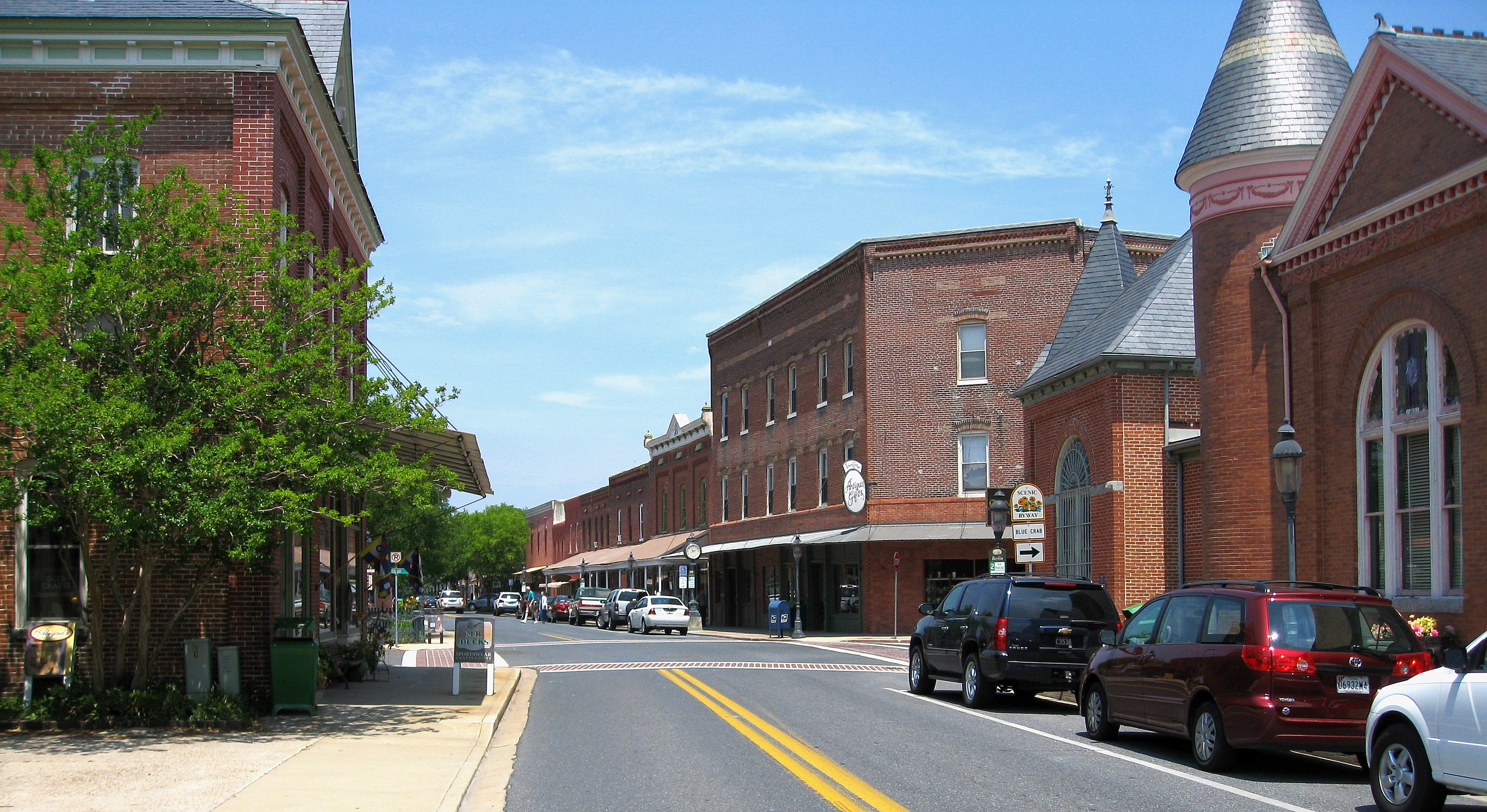
MD 818 northbound at MD 376 in Berlin

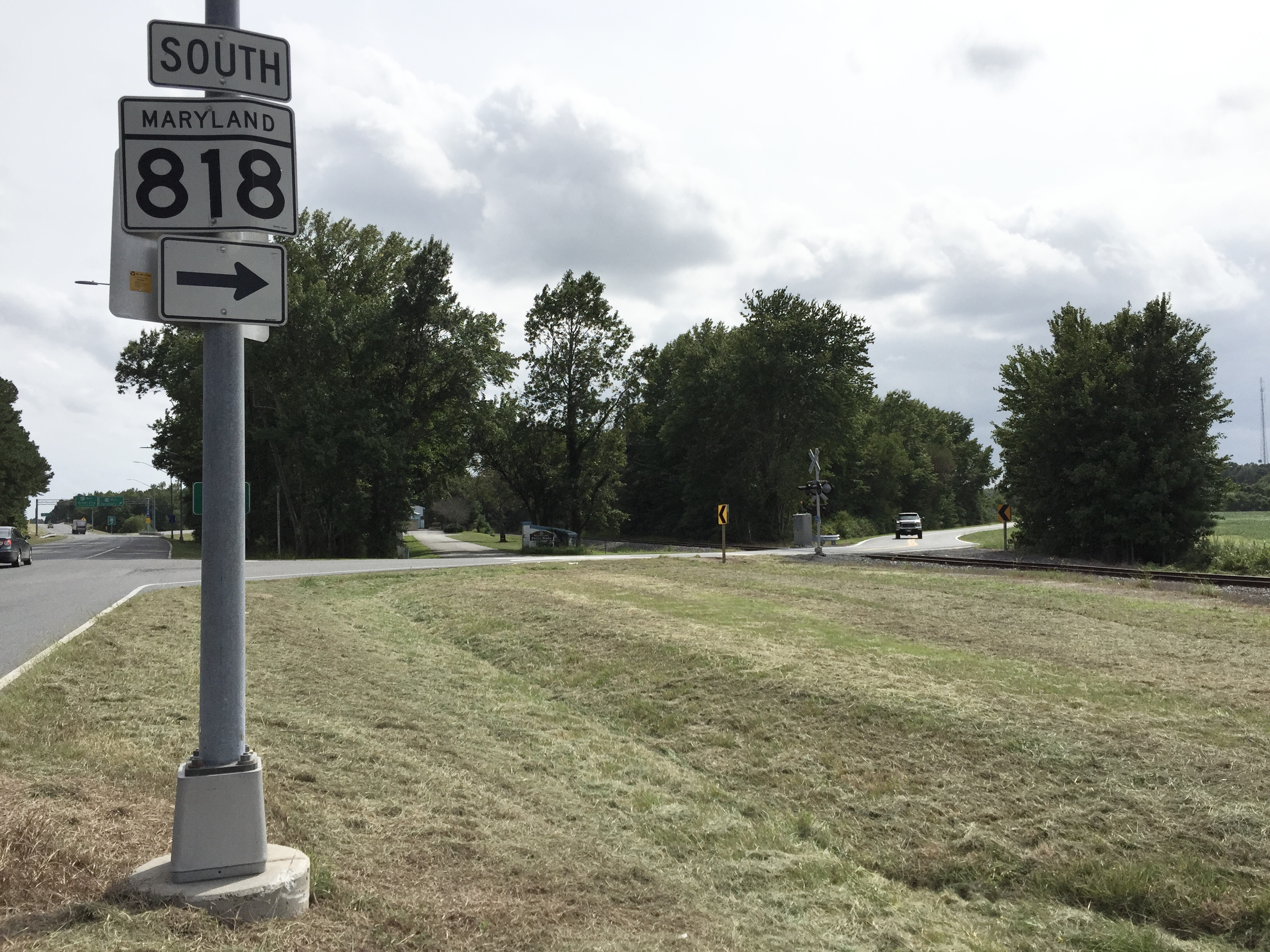
View south at the north end of MD 818 at US 113 on the north side of Berlin

MD 818 begins at an intersection with US 113 (Worcester Highway) on the south side of Berlin. Germantown Road continues as a county highway on the east side of the intersection. MD 818 heads north through the town of Berlin as a two-lane undivided road, passing Worcester Preparatory School, Buckingham Elementary School, and the historic home Burley Manor. The state highway enters the Berlin Commercial District, where the highway intersects MD 376 (Bay Street), MD 374 (Broad Street), and unsigned MD 375 (Commerce Street) in rapid succession, with MD 377 (Williams Street) accessed from MD 376 just to the east. After passing the Calvin B. Taylor House Museum, MD 818 leaves the downtown area. The state highway crosses the Snow Hill Line of the Maryland and Delaware Railroad at a rakish angle before intersecting MD 346 (Old Ocean City Boulevard) and leaving the town of Berlin. MD 818 passes through farmland and intersects US 50 (Ocean Gateway). The state highway continues north, crossing the railroad track again before reaching its northern terminus at US 113. Georgetown Road continues as a county highway on the east side of the intersection.

== History ==
Main Street was paved through Berlin by 1910 and designated part of US 113 in 1927. US 113's bypass of Berlin was under construction by 1955 and completed in 1957.

== Junction list ==
The entire route is in Berlin, Worcester County.

mi	km	Destinations	Notes
0.00	0.00	US 113 (Worcester Highway) / Germantown Road south – Snow Hill	Southern terminus
0.80	1.29	MD 376 east (Bay Street) – Assateague Island National Seashore	Western terminus of MD 376
0.82	1.32	MD 374 west (Broad Street) – Libertytown, Powellville	Eastern terminus of MD 374
0.87	1.40	MD 375 west (Commerce Street)	Eastern terminus of MD 375; MD 375 is unsigned and one-way westbound
1.47	2.37	MD 346 (Old Ocean City Boulevard)	
2.16	3.48	US 50 (Ocean Gateway) – Salisbury, Ocean City	
2.62	4.22	US 113 (Worcester Highway) / Georgetown Road east – Selbyville, DE	Northern terminus
1.000 mi = 1.609 km; 1.000 km = 0.621 mi

== Auxiliary route ==
MD 818A is a 0.085-mile (0.137 km) one-way ramp from southbound MD 818 to southbound US 113 at the southern junction with US 113 that follows the U.S. Highway's original alignment.
