= Lewis Corner, Maryland =

Unincorporated community in Maryland, United States

- Unincorporated community
- Location within Maryland
- Coordinates: 38°17′24″N 75°09′04″W
- Country: United States
- State: Maryland
- County: Worcester
- Elevation: 7 ft (2.1 m)
- Time zone: UTC-5 (Eastern (EST))
  - Summer (DST): UTC-4 (EDT)
- Area codes: 410 & 443
- GNIS feature ID: 590657

Lewis Corner is an unincorporated community in Worcester County, Maryland, United States. Lewis Corner is located at the junction of Maryland routes 376 and 611, 4.3 miles (6.9 km) east-southeast of Berlin.
