= Calvin Taylor =

Calvin Taylor may refer to:

- Calvin B. Taylor (1857–1932), American banker, lawyer, educator and politician
- Calvin Howard Taylor (1896–19??), politician in Ontario, Canada
- Calvin Taylor, a character on the New Zealand soap opera Shortland Street
