= Maryland Route 376 =

Highway in Maryland

Maryland Route 376
- Maryland Route 376 highlighted in red

Route information
- Maintained by MDSHA
- Length: 4.56 mi (7.34 km)
- Existed: 1927–present
- Tourist routes: Cape to Cape Scenic Byway

Major junctions
- West end: MD 818 in Berlin
- MD 377 in Berlin; US 113 in Berlin
- East end: MD 611 at Lewis Corner

Location
- Country: United States
- State: Maryland
- Counties: Worcester

Highway system
- Maryland highway system; Interstate; US; State; Scenic Byways
← MD 375	→ MD 377

Maryland Route 376 (MD 376) is a state highway in the U.S. state of Maryland. Known for most of its length as Assateague Road, the state highway runs 4.56 miles (7.34 km) from MD 818 in Berlin east to MD 611 at Lewis Corner. MD 376 connects Berlin with communities on the Sinepuxent Neck and, in conjunction with MD 611, connects Berlin with Assateague Island National Seashore. The state highway was constructed from Berlin in the second half of the 1920s and the early 1930s.

== Route description ==
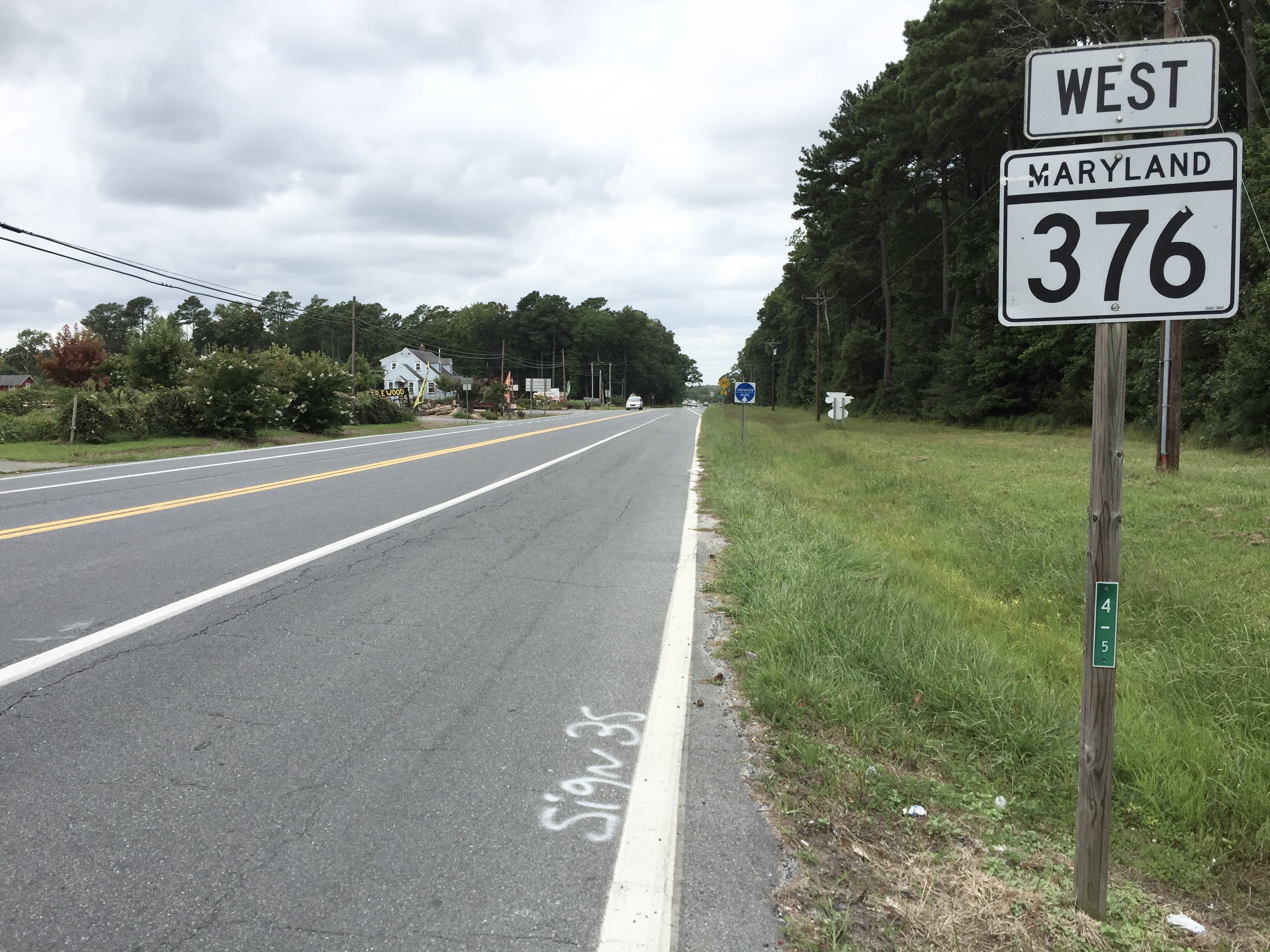
View west along MD 376 at MD 611 in Lewis Corner

MD 376 begins at an intersection with MD 818 (Main Street) in Berlin. After intersecting the southern end of MD 377 (Williams Street), the state highway heads east as two-lane undivided Bay Street east to U.S. Route 113 (US 113, Worcester Highway) and leaves the town of Berlin upon traversing Hudson Branch. The highway's name changes to Assateague Road and MD 376 continues southeast through farmland and forest, intersecting Sinepuxent Road after crossing Trappe Creek. The state highway spans Ayres Creek before reaching its eastern terminus at MD 611 (Stephen Decatur Highway) in Lewis Corner. The section of MD 376 east of US 113 provides access, along with MD 611, to the Maryland section of Assateague Island for traffic coming from US 113 from points north and US 50 from points west.

== History ==
MD 376 was paved from the Berlin town line to just east of Trappe Creek in 1924. Bay Street within Berlin was paved in 1925. By 1930, MD 376 had been completed east almost to Ayres Creek. The state highway was complete to Lewis Corner by 1933.

== Junction list ==
The entire route is in Worcester County.

Location	mi	km	Destinations	Notes
Berlin	0.00	0.00	MD 818 (Main Street)	Western terminus
Berlin	0.01	0.016	MD 377 north (Williams Street)	Southern terminus of MD 377
Berlin	0.42	0.68	US 113 (Worcester Highway) to US 50 – Snow Hill	
Lewis Corner	4.56	7.34	MD 611 (Stephen Decatur Highway) – Ocean City, Assateague Island Parks	Eastern terminus
1.000 mi = 1.609 km; 1.000 km = 0.621 mi
