= Mar-Va Theater =

- U.S. National Register of Historic Places
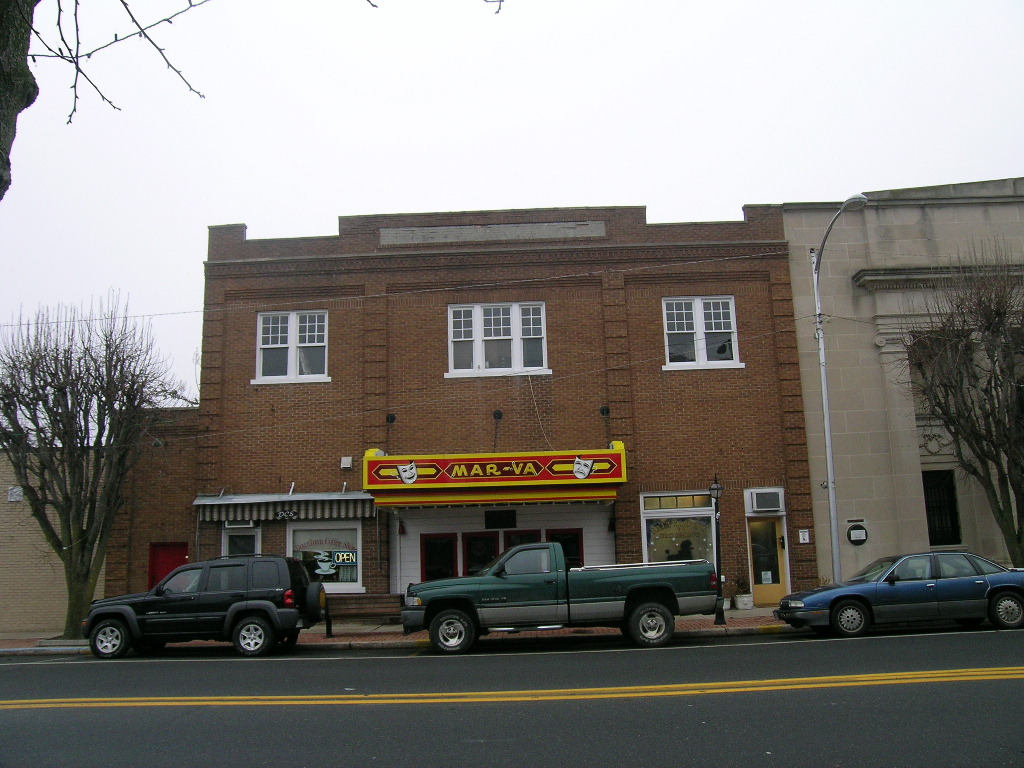
- The Mar-Va Theater in 2005

- Location within Maryland Location within the United States
- Location: 103 Market St., Pocomoke City, Maryland
- Coordinates: 38°4′33″N 75°34′9″W
- Area: 0.1 acres (0.040 ha)
- Built: 1927
- Architectural style: Art Deco
- NRHP reference No.: 96000301
- Added to NRHP: March 21, 1996

The Mar-Va Theater is a historic theater located in Pocomoke City, Worcester County, Maryland. It was constructed in 1927 and is a two-story, three-bay building of brick laid in stretcher bond. The interior reflects an extensive Art Deco style redecoration carried out in 1937 including narrow silver columns on either side of the stage and embellishments on the side walls. It is currently operated as a performing arts center.

One of the few remaining links to Pocomoke's past is the Mar-Va Theater. Its name is representative of its location, since the theater is located in Maryland, only a short distance from the Virginia state line. With originally 720 seats, the Mar-Va is the largest theater south of Wilmington, Delaware, which has never been altered. Once used as a vaudeville theater complete with stage facilities, dressing rooms and orchestra pits, the Mar-Va was played by many performers, which included some old-time cowboys such as Tom Mix, Roy Rogers, William Boyd and Smiley Burnette.

Mr. & Mrs. Frank Barlett of Berlin, Maryland built the Mar-Va Theater in 1927. It has been estimated that it would probably cost around $250,000 to build by present economic standards.

The Mar-Va Theater is one of the few theaters on the shore to boast of a draw drape. The sidewalls have the original gold embossed paneling and the projectors, which were added around 1943, are of the carbon arc variety. The balcony was once used for segregation purposes. It had its own entrance, concession area, box office and bathroom. The seats in the balcony were considered the best in the theater.

The theater opened on December 1, 1927, with John & Lester Fox managing the theater while J. Dawson Clarke played the piano for the old silent movies. In 1949, after the death of John Fox, J. Dawson Clarke and Orville Mason bought the theater and, in 1967, the ownership went to Dawson and his wife Hattie.

When the theater originally opened, ticket prices were 10 cents. At the time of its closing in 1993, a ticket cost $3.50. Soda pop, sold in the soda parlor next door, once cost 10 cents and popcorn was always sold for 10 cents a bag.

It was listed on the National Register of Historic Places in 1996.
