= Verrazano Bridge (Maryland) =

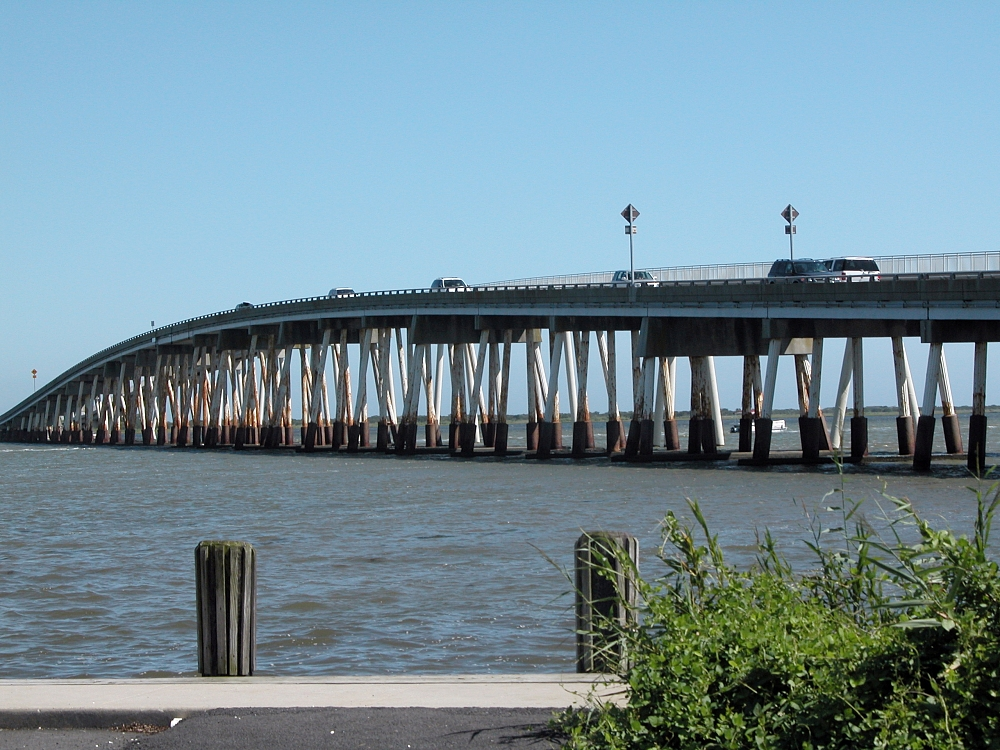
- The Verrazano Bridge
- Coordinates: 38.245734°N 75.149660°W
- Carries: Two lanes of MD 611 and pedestrians/bicycles
- Crosses: Sinepuxent Bay
- Locale: Assateague Island, Maryland
- Maintained by: Maryland State Highway Administration
- ID number: 23018

History
- Opened: 1964

Statistics
- Daily traffic: 5,302

Location
- Interactive map of Verrazano Bridge

The Verrazano Bridge is a bridge on Maryland Route 611 over Sinepuxent Bay that connects Assateague Island to the mainland.

The crossing, built in 1964, contains two spans, one carrying automobiles and the other carrying pedestrians and bicycles. It is owned by Maryland, not by the National Park Service. NPS, however, does own part of Assateague Island.

== History ==
Like the larger and more famous Verrazzano–Narrows Bridge, it is named for Giovanni da Verrazzano; the bridge's name is misspelled with one "z". Maryland ferry service ended when the Verrazano Bridge was built in 1964.
