= James Lee Purnell Jr. =

American politician and activist (1937–2021)

Member of the Worcester County Board of County Commissioners
- In office December 3, 1995 – 2014
- Preceded by: Floyd Bassett

President, Worcester County Board of County Commissioners
- In office 2005–2008

Vice President, Worcester County Board of County Commissioners
- In office 1995–2005
- In office 2010–2012

Personal details
- Born: James Lee Purnell Jr. July 26, 1937 Berlin, Maryland, U.S.
- Died: December 27, 2021 (aged 84)
- Spouse: Clemeth Hardy (m. 1961)
- Occupation: Politician, social activist
- Known for: First African-American elected to public office in Worcester County, Maryland

James Lee Purnell Jr. (July 26, 1937 – December 27, 2021) was an American politician and social activist. He was best known as the first African-American elected to public office in Worcester County, Maryland. Prior to his election he was one of the lead plaintiffs in a voting rights lawsuit to end at-large voting and create a majority "minority" voting district in Worcester County, Maryland. At the time, Purnell was President of the NAACP's Worcester County branch.

== Early life and education ==
Purnell was born on July 26, 1937, in Berlin, Maryland, on the black side of town known as Briddeltown, to Hulda McCray Purnell (1911–2000) and James Lee Purnell Sr. (1908–1994), a mill worker and dairy farmer. He was the oldest of eight children from his parents' marriage, followed by Edward L. Purnell, Patricia E. Purnell Hingleton, Gerald W. Purnell Sr., Benjamin H. Purnell Sr., Gilbert C. Purnell, Hennie M. Purnell Chase, and Bertha C. Purnell. He also has three older siblings from his parents' previous relationships: Joshua W. McCray, Osie Henry, and Virginia Purnell. He was the cousin of American college basketball coach Oliver Purnell, and of the Honorable Gerald V. Purnell, the first African-American judge on Maryland's Eastern Shore.

Before walking a mile to his primary school, his daily chores included milking the family's seventeen cows and delivering fresh milk with his father. At the all-black schools he attended, the students only had access to secondhand books from the white schools. The books frequently had marked-up, torn, and missing pages. Despite this, Purnell's grades were good through seventh grade. When his grades slipped, the principal and three teachers came to his parents' home to discuss them.

Berlin was a segregated town with whites and blacks living on opposite sides of U.S. 113. Blacks who went uptown to shop had a designated parking area and only had access to one filthy bathroom. Two years in a row, he and his friends went to watch the Halloween parade in town and were chased back across the highway by white boys wielding bricks. Loitering on the sidewalks was prohibited. Around 1947, he and his sister Patricia were standing near the corner of Main and William Streets while waiting for their mother to complete her purchase at the shoe store. Berlin policeman Noah Hudson yelled at them, "N____, get off the street!" and then struck his sister in the stomach with his blackjack. His sister was age 7 at the time. Hudson apologized when their father confronted him, but still lost his job as James Lee Purnell Sr. pursued the incident with Hudson's superiors and town officials. James Jr. learned a valuable lesson about persistence and fighting for good.

Despite the discouragement of others, Purnell applied for a job at Sunshine Laundry on the white side of town in 1953. They hired him on the spot, and as their first black employee, he worked there as an extractor until he graduated from Worcester High School in 1955.

During his young adulthood, Purnell became a long-distance truck driver. He married Clemeth Hardy on Christmas Day 1961. In 1971, he began a successful drapery installation business with his wife during the condominium boom in the resort town of Ocean City, Maryland. In 1976, he also became a bus contractor for Worcester County Public Schools and continued as one.

== Social activism ==
In 1981, Purnell and others in the black community of Berlin and the Worcester County NAACP went before the county's Board of Commissioners to request the closure of the landfill that was behind his parents' home and in the center of Briddeltown. Once believed to be temporary, the uncovered and untreated landfill created a stench on the black side of town. The Commissioners refused, but after the Maryland Board of Health became involved the landfill was closed nearly 4 years later. Since the landfill had been polluting their well water supplies, the black residents were also given access to the county's water system.

After becoming President of the Worcester County NAACP in 1986, he led the organization and black county residents to march along the Ocean City Boardwalk. The July 5, 1986, march was to draw attention to the lack of non-menial resort jobs for blacks and the lack of images of black families in its tourism advertisements.

As their president, Purnell and the NAACP began to challenge the illegal voting practices of the county. Prior to this, only three African-Americans had run for the office of Commissioner in Worcester County, but all lost their bids. Together with the ACLU, Purnell was a plaintiff in a 1992 lawsuit stating that at-large voting discriminated against blacks.

After multiple appeals by the Worcester County Board of Commissioners and the Supreme Court's refusal to hear the case, the 4th U.S. Circuit Court of Appeals ordered Worcester County on June 16, 1995, to abolish at-large voting, to create (at that time) the only majority "minority" voting district on the Eastern Shore, and to hold elections in November. The lawsuit and appeals had kept the county polls closed in 1994. The five Republican Commissioners accrued $800,000 in legal fees in their attempt to retain the old voting system. Worcester County was also liable for the $400,000 in legal fees due to the plaintiffs' legal team, the ACLU.

With a looming July 3 deadline to file as a candidate, no other African-Americans stepped forward to run in the new minority District 3. Purnell resigned as NAACP President and announced his candidacy for County Commissioner on June 23, 1995.

== The 1995 election ==
Worcester County's election for the 5-member Board of Commissioners was held November 7, 1995. Purnell narrowly defeated Republican incumbent Floyd Bassett. His win made him the first African-American elected to public office in Worcester County's 253-year history. Purnell remarked that day was both the "proudest and saddest" day of his life, because his father was not alive to witness it. He was sworn into office on December 3, 1995.

== Long-serving County Commissioner ==
Purnell retained his seat as County Commissioner through five terms until he retired in 2014. During his time in office, his fellow Commissioners elected him their vice-president from 1995 to 2005, and from 2010 to 2012. He served as the commission's president from 2005 to 2008.

While in office, Purnell sought to improve county hiring practices and push diversity among county employees. When the Worcester County School Board solicited his support for its annual budget, he refused until it agreed to correct their shortage of African-American teachers. As a result, seventeen were hired within that first year.

Purnell died December 27, 2021, at the age of 84.

== Organization memberships ==
- member, Worcester County, Maryland Board of County Commissioners (1995–2014, Vice-president 1995–2005, President 2005–2008, Vice-president 2010–2012)
- member, NAACP of Worcester County, Maryland (President 1986–1995, Vice President)
- member, NAACP of Maryland (Vice-president 1992–1995)
- member, Worcester County Board of Health (1994–2014)
- member, Tri-County Council for the Lower Eastern Shore (2006–2014)
- member, St. Paul United Methodist Church of Berlin, MD (1957–present)
- 32 degree Prince Hall Freemason and member of the Order of the Eastern Star
- Founder, annual Martin Luther King Jr. banquet (1985)

== Awards ==
- Citizenship Award (2015) from the Tri-County Council of the Lower Eastern Shore
- Inductee (2016) into the Maryland Senior Citizens Hall of Fame
