= Ocean City Municipal Airport (Maryland) =

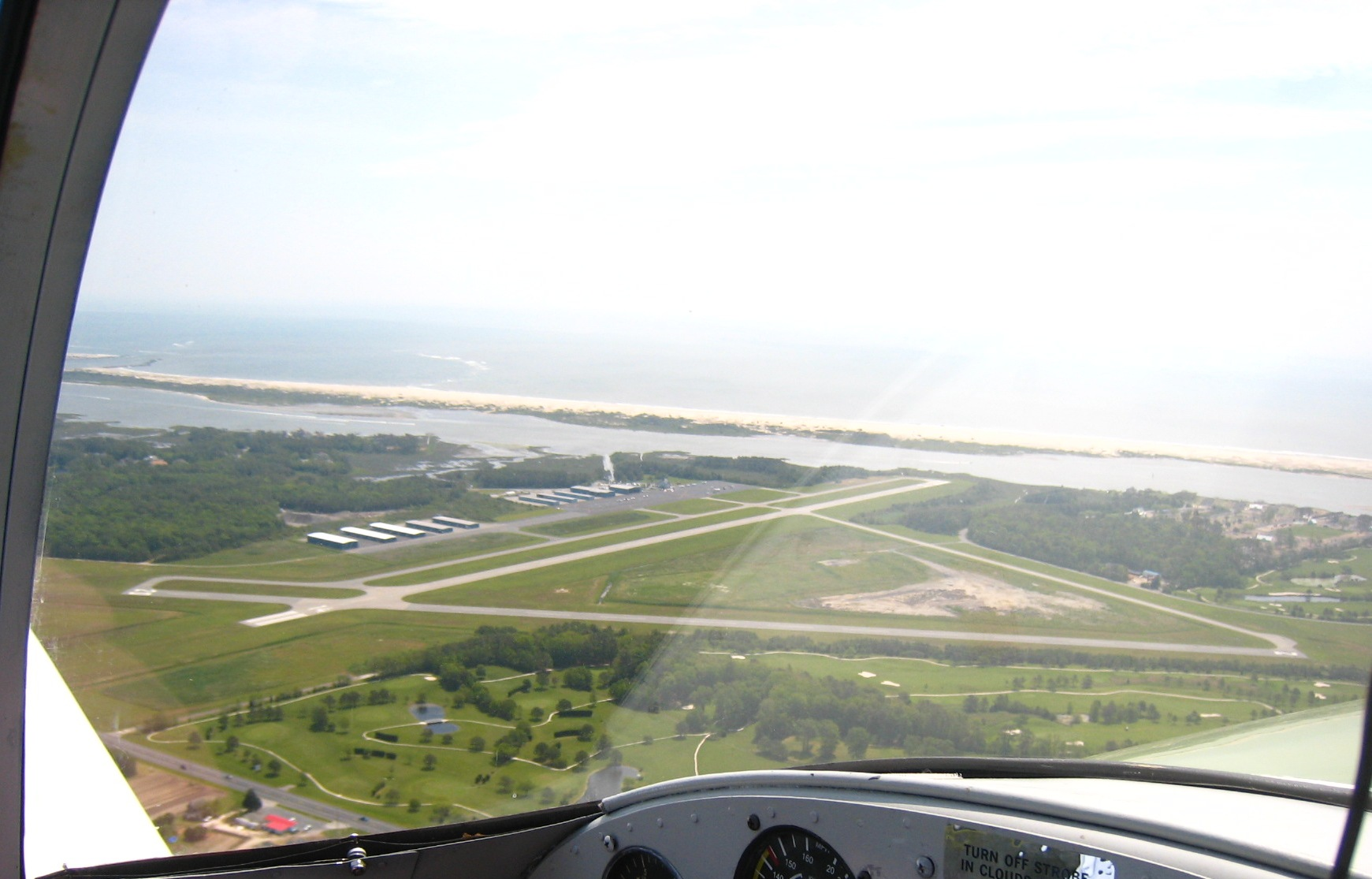
- IATA: OCE; ICAO: KOXB; FAA LID: OXB

Summary
- Airport type: Public
- Owner: Town of Ocean City
- Location: Ocean City, Maryland
- Elevation AMSL: 16 ft (4.9 m)
- Coordinates: 38°18′38″N 075°07′26″W
- Website: oceancitymd.gov/...

Map
- Location of airport in Maryland

Runways
| Direction | Length | | Surface |
| Direction | ft | m | Surface |
|---|---|---|---|
| 2/20 | 3,204 | 977 | Asphalt/concrete |
| 14/32 | 4,074 | 1,242 | Asphalt/concrete |

Statistics (2023)
- Aircraft operations (year ending 5/6/2023): 38,856
- Based aircraft: 51
- Source: Federal Aviation Administration

Ocean City Municipal Airport (IATA: OCE, ICAO: KOXB, FAA LID: OXB) is a public facility serving Ocean City, a town in Worcester County, Maryland, United States. It is located 3 statute miles (5 km) southwest of town, off Route 611 in West Ocean City. The airport opened in October 1960.

Most U.S. airports use the same three-letter location identifier for the FAA and IATA, but Ocean City Municipal Airport is OXB to the FAA and OCE to the IATA.

== Facilities and aircraft ==
Ocean City Municipal Airport covers an area of 578 acres (234 ha) which contains two asphalt and concrete paved runways: 2/20 measuring 3,204 x 75 ft (977 x 23 m) and 14/32 measuring 4,074 x 75 ft (1,242 x 23 m).

For the 12-month period ending May 6, 2023, the airport had 38,856 operations, an average of 106 operations per day: 97% general aviation, 1% air taxi, and 2% military. There was 51 aircraft based at this airport: 43 single engine, 7 multi-engine, and 1 helicopter.

Ocean Aviation is the full-service FBO available on airport grounds, serving as Ocean City's Cessna pilot center and FAA Part 141 approved flight academy.

Ocean City Municipal Airport offers biplane rides for $25, on a biplane called the "Cloud Dancer." This is a fairly popular attraction, as the biplane used for this is often seen over the skies of Ocean City. Helicopter rides are also given, using a Robinson R22. Skydiving services are also offered.

== History ==
Ocean City airport opened in 1960. During the early 1980's, the airport saw commercial airline service to Baltimore by Allegheny Commuter and Henson the Piedmont Regional Airline.

In 1994, Jimmy Mathis piloted a Cessna 172 Solo from Ocean City, Maryland to Long Beach, California, becoming the youngest solo aviator ever to fly cross country.

== See also ==
- List of airports in Maryland
