= Ironshire, Maryland =

Unincorporated community in Maryland, United States

- Unincorporated community
- Location within Maryland
- Coordinates: 38°17′02″N 75°13′52″W
- Country: United States
- State: Maryland
- County: Worcester
- Elevation: 33 ft (10 m)
- Time zone: UTC-5 (Eastern (EST))
  - Summer (DST): UTC-4 (EDT)
- ZIP code: 21811
- Area codes: 410, 443, and 667
- GNIS feature ID: 590540

Ironshire is an unincorporated community in Worcester County, Maryland, United States. Ironshire is located at the intersection of U.S. Route 113 and Ironshire Station Road/Mason Road, south of Berlin.

Simpson's Grove was listed on the National Register of Historic Places in 1996.
