= Merry Sherwood =

Historic house in Maryland, United States

- U.S. National Register of Historic Places
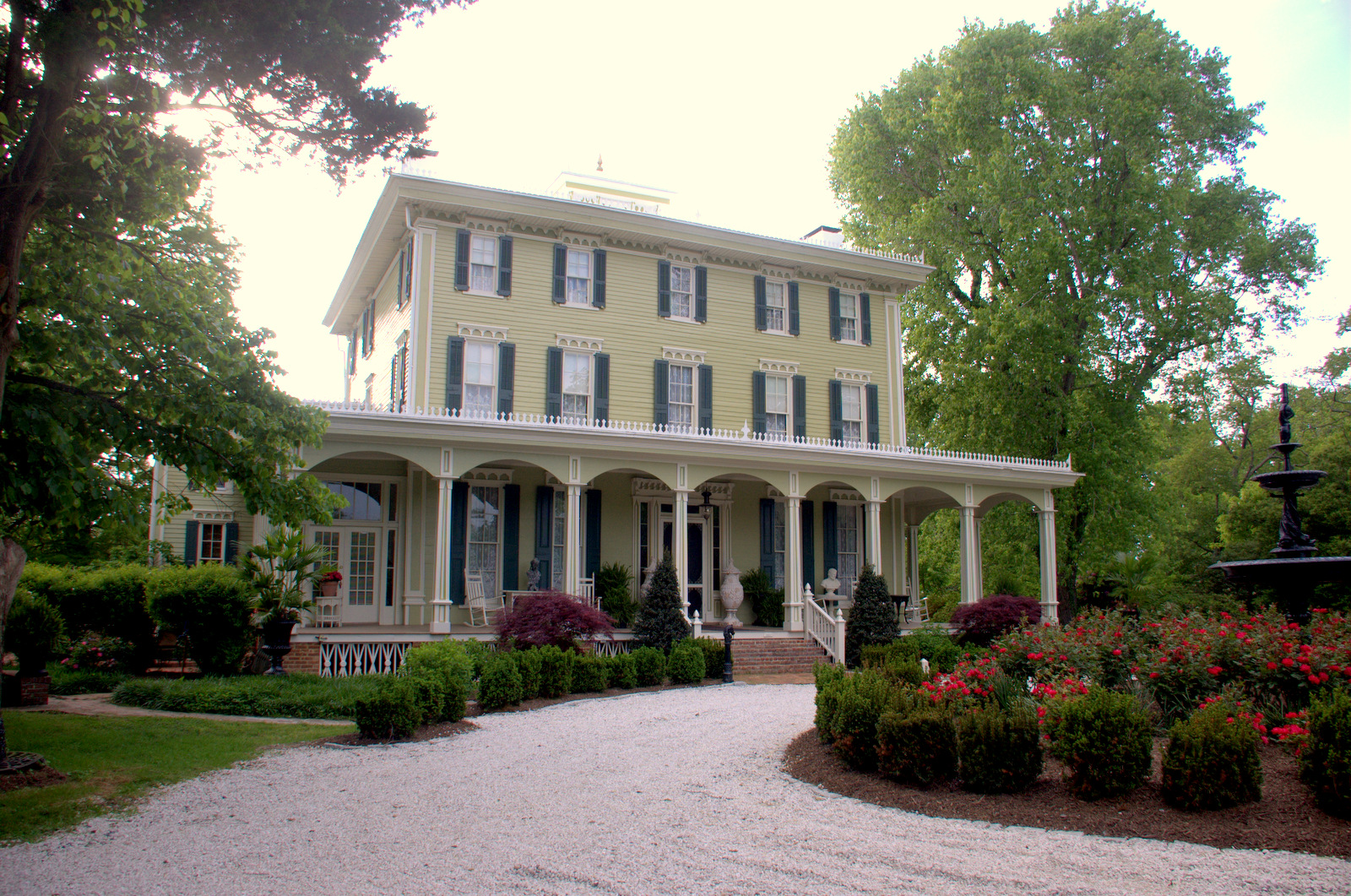

- Location within Maryland Location within the United States
- Location: 8909 Worcester Highway (US 113), Berlin, Maryland
- Coordinates: 38°18′20″N 75°13′23″W
- Area: 10.8 acres (4.4 ha)
- Built: 1859
- Architectural style: Italianate
- NRHP reference No.: 91001420
- Added to NRHP: September 20, 1991

Merry Sherwood is a historic plantation house located at Berlin, Worcester County, Maryland, United States. It is a massive, three-story, five-bay, double-pile, frame dwelling, built about 1859 in the Italianate style. The house is topped by a flat roof, projecting cornice, and a large cupola. The roof of the cupola is capped with a pointed wooden spire. It is current operated as wedding and special event venue.

Merry Sherwood was listed on the National Register of Historic Places in 1991.
