= Captain Robert S. Craig Cottage =

Historic house in Maryland, United States

- U.S. National Register of Historic Places
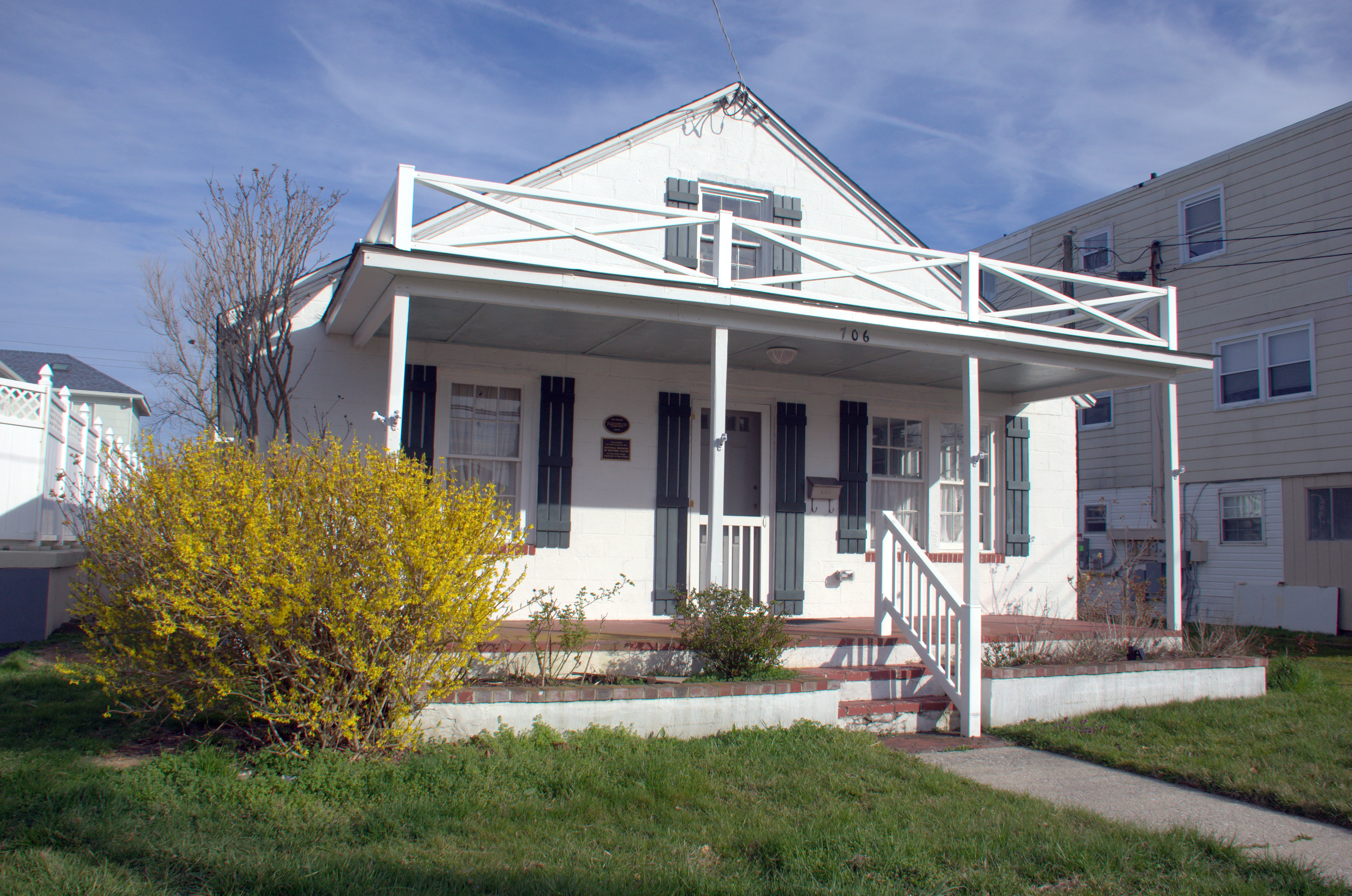

- Location within Maryland Location within the United States
- Location: 706 St. Louis Ave. Ocean City, Maryland
- Coordinates: 38°20′21.6″N 75°05′04.2″W
- Area: less than one acre
- Built: 1949-1950
- NRHP reference No.: 100002630
- Added to NRHP: December 26, 2017

The Captain Robert S. Craig Cottage, also known as Bay Breeze, is a historic building located in Ocean City, Worcester County, Maryland, United States. It is a simple 1½-story rectangular frame structure with a gable roof. The full-width front porch is capped with an open X-cross balustrade. A two-bedroom rental apartment was added to the rear of the house around 1964. At about the same time, a tool shed that originally stood on a lot at 13th Street and Philadelphia Avenue was moved to this location and converted into an efficiency rental apartment.

The significance of this house is its association with Captain Robert S. Craig who developed and led the Ocean City Beach Patrol (OCBP), the local lifeguard organization. For nearly three decades, this building served as its headquarters and a residence for summer lifeguards. It was designed by Craig and built from 1949 to 1950. His son Robert designed the rear addition and had the tool shed moved here.

During the time the building served the OCBP, the organization became known across the country for its management and ocean rescue operation. It was Craig who had the lifeguards utilize semaphore communications among themselves and integrated innovative rescue technology. The building was listed on the National Register of Historic Places in 2017.
