= Calvin B. Taylor =

American politician (1857–1932)

Mayor of Berlin, Maryland
- In office 1914–1916
- Preceded by: Orlando Harrison
- Succeeded by: Edward S. Furbush

Member of the Maryland House of Delegates from Worcester County
- In office January 3, 1912 – January 7, 1914
- Preceded by: William F. King; Severn Murray; Reece C. Peters
- Succeeded by: John Hagan; William H. Price; Milton L. Veasey
- In office January 5, 1898 – January 3, 1900
- Preceded by: Horace F. Harmonson; William F. Johnson; Edwin H. Taylor
- Succeeded by: Henry J. Anderson; Charles F. Truitt; Lloyd Wilkinson

Personal details
- Born: December 28, 1857
- Died: May 31, 1932 (aged 74)
- Party: Democratic
- Spouse: Martha "Mattie" Collins Taylor
- Children: Thomas Collins Taylor
- Education: Western Maryland College (B.A., M.A.)
- Occupation: Banker, lawyer, educator

Calvin Bowen Taylor (December 28, 1857 – May 31, 1932) was an American banker, politician, lawyer, and educator. He served on the town council of and as mayor of Berlin, Maryland, served two terms in the Maryland House of Delegates, and founded a banking company bearing his name that continues to exist in eastern Maryland and Delaware.

== Early life and education ==
The son of Arthur W. Taylor and Margaret Ellen Bowen Taylor, Calvin B. Taylor was born at Trappe Creek Farm near Berlin, Maryland, on December 28, 1857. Growing up on the farm, he attended public schools in addition to Old Buckingham Academy. He earned a Bachelor of Arts in 1882 and later a Master of Arts degree from Western Maryland College (now McDaniel College).

== Career ==
Taylor became an educator after earning his degrees, teaching at Bishopville Academy before becoming principal. He subsequently returned to Buckingham Academy, his alma mater, to serve as its first principal after becoming Berlin High School. He would remain in that position for six years, studying law and being admitted to the bar in 1886 or 1887 during that time, until resigning in 1889 to practice law full-time.

Shortly thereafter, in 1890, Taylor entered business as a banker in conjunction with his law partner, Edward D. Martin. Originally a private bank under the name of Calvin B. Taylor, Banker, Martin withdrew before its renaming to Calvin B. Taylor Banking Company and its 1907 incorporation as the Calvin B. Taylor Banking Company of Berlin. The corporation remains in existence in Worcester County, Maryland and Sussex County, Delaware, as Taylor Bank. Taylor also served as director of the First National Bank in Snow Hill, Maryland, as well as the Bishopville Bank. In addition to banking, Taylor also began an insurance company connected to the bank under the name of Calvin B. Taylor & Co. in conjunction with William L. Holloway, which also remains in existence as Smith, Cropper & Deeley Inc.

Having established a name for himself in the local community, Taylor served for four years as a member of the Berlin Town Council. In 1898, he was elected to represent Worcester County in the Maryland House of Delegates, receiving 2,109 votes, the most of any of the nine candidates in the field—three of whom were elected. He served one term, through 1899, before returning in 1912 for another term through 1913. He subsequently served for two years, from 1914 to 1916, as Mayor of Berlin. In addition to holding governmental office, Taylor served on the Maryland Democratic State Central Committee for 25 years.

Taylor continued to practice law and serve as president and chairman of the board of directors for the Calvin B. Taylor Banking Company until his death on May 31, 1932. He was interred in Buckingham Cemetery.

== Personal life and family ==
Calvin B. Taylor married his wife, Martha "Mattie" Collins of Hannibal, Missouri, on July 21, 1886, while serving as principal of Berlin High School. The couple purchased the building presently known as the Calvin B. Taylor House in September 1894 and had only one child, Thomas Collins Taylor, who died as an infant. Taylor also was active throughout his life as a member of the Buckingham Presbyterian Church.
