= Calvin B. Taylor House =

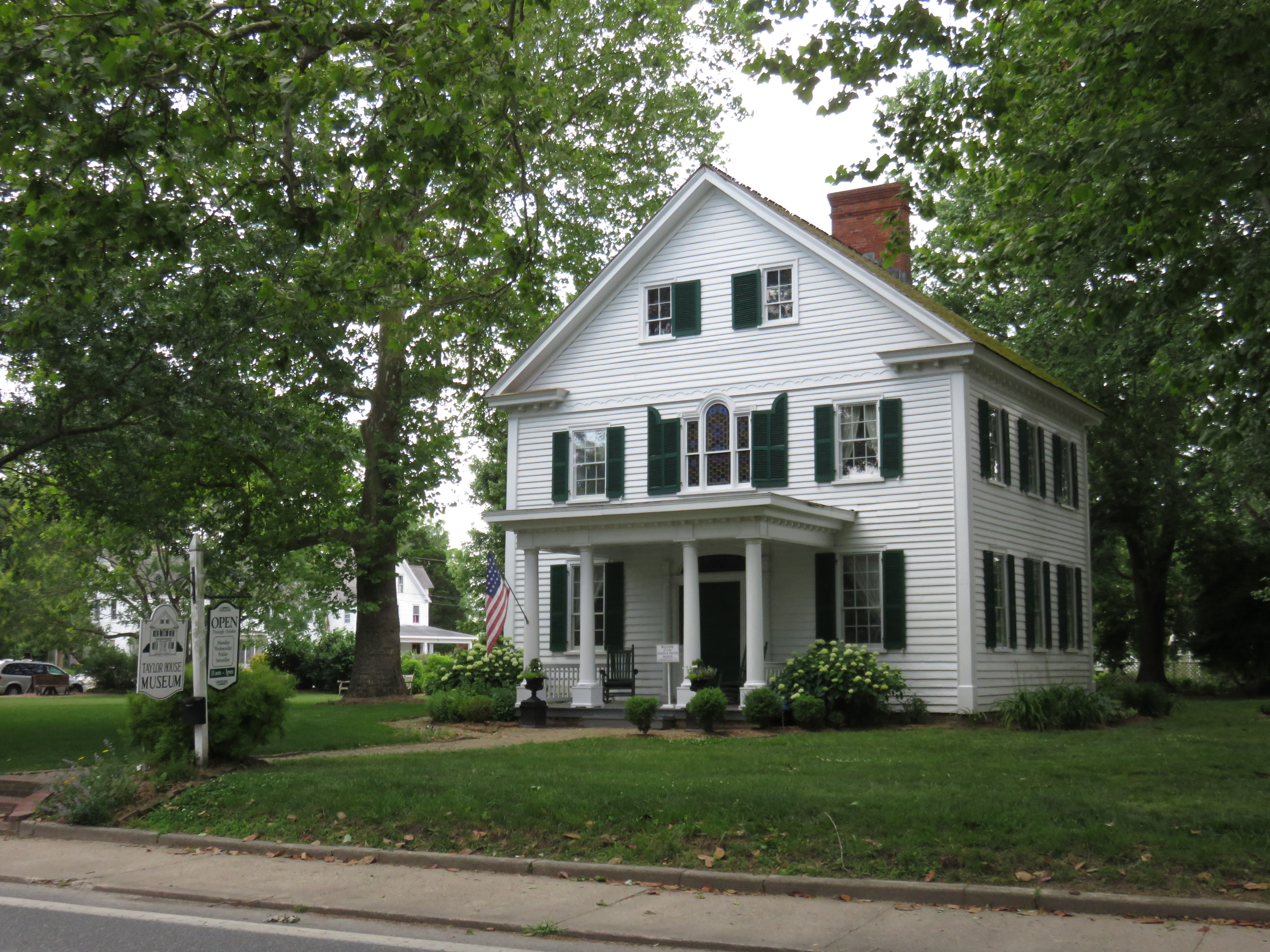
- Taylor House in 2019
- Interactive map of the Calvin B. Taylor House area

General information
- Type: House
- Architectural style: Federal
- Location: 208 Main Street; Berlin, Maryland
- Coordinates: 38°19′38″N 75°13′13.5″W
- Construction started: 1832

Technical details
- Structural system: Wood
- Floor count: 3

The Calvin B. Taylor House is a historic U.S. home located at 208 Main Street, Berlin, Maryland. The house currently serves as The Calvin B. Taylor House Museum, which displays antiques and local memorabilia.
