= St. Paul's by-the-sea Protestant Episcopal Church =

Historic church in Maryland, United States

- U.S. National Register of Historic Places
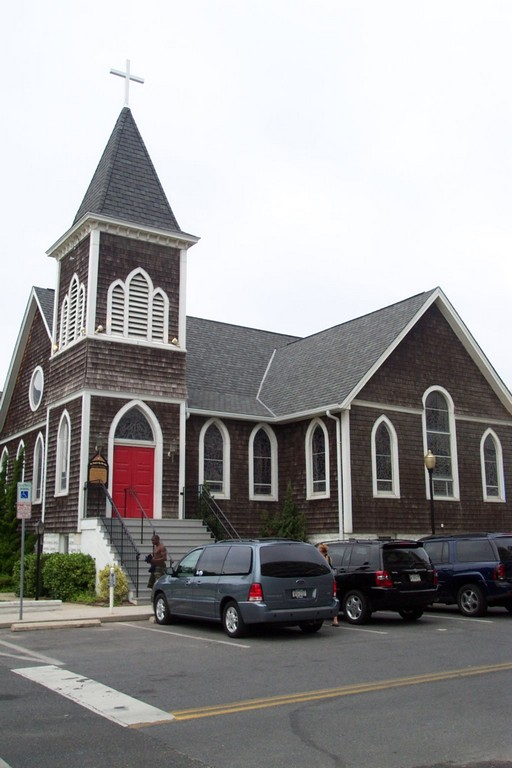

- Location within Maryland Location within the United States
- Location: 302 N. Baltimore Ave., Ocean City, Maryland
- Coordinates: 38°20′5″N 75°5′5″W
- Area: less than one acre
- Built: 1900-1901
- Architectural style: Carpenter Gothic
- NRHP reference No.: 08001013
- Added to NRHP: October 22, 2008

St. Paul's by-the-sea Protestant Episcopal Church is a parish of the Episcopal Church located in Ocean City, Worcester County, Maryland. It is noted for its historic Carpenter Gothic parish church, which was listed on the National Register of Historic Places in 2008.

Episcopal services were held from 1878 at Congress Hall, with a mission church built nearby in 1881. In 1898, John Waggaman of Washington D.C. donated two lots "up the beach" at Baltimore Avenue and Third Street to the congregation. The cornerstone for the new church was laid on June 6, 1900, and the first service was held the following year. In 1924, it was elevated to parochial status.

== Architecture ==
The church is a frame church with a wood-shingled exterior. There is a corner bell tower and entrance with pointed-arch openings.

The altar, made of quartered oak, was presented to the church in 1903 by the Women's Auxiliary of the Diocese of Easton. The Italian marble baptismal font was an 1893 gift of Josephine L. Massey, proprietor of the Hamilton Hotel.
