= Simpson's Grove =

Historic house in Maryland, United States

- U.S. National Register of Historic Places
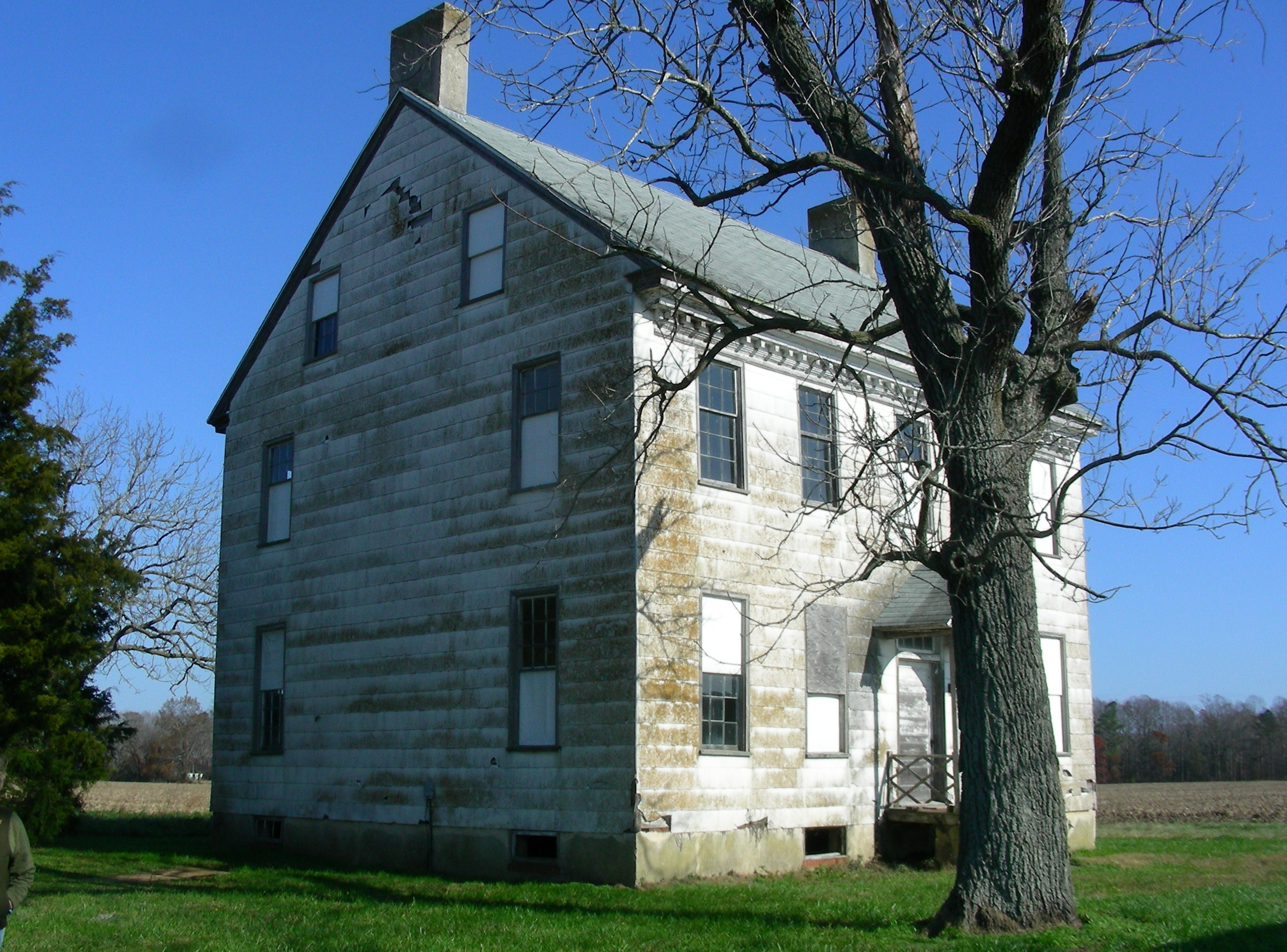
- Simpson's Grove in 2009

- Location within Maryland Location within the United States
- Location: Downs Road, Ironshire, Maryland
- Coordinates: 38°16′42″N 75°14′53″W
- Area: less than one acre
- Built: 1800
- Architectural style: Federal
- NRHP reference No.: 96000949
- Added to NRHP: August 30, 1996

Simpson's Grove, also known as Hudson Farm, is a historic home located at Ironshire, Worcester County, Maryland, United States. It was built about 1800 and is a two-story, five bay, double pile Federal-style frame house. A brick dairy stands on the property. The exterior is sided in cypress.

Simpson's Grove was listed on the National Register of Historic Places in 1996.
