= Old Friendship United Methodist Church =

Historic church in Maryland, United States

- U.S. National Register of Historic Places
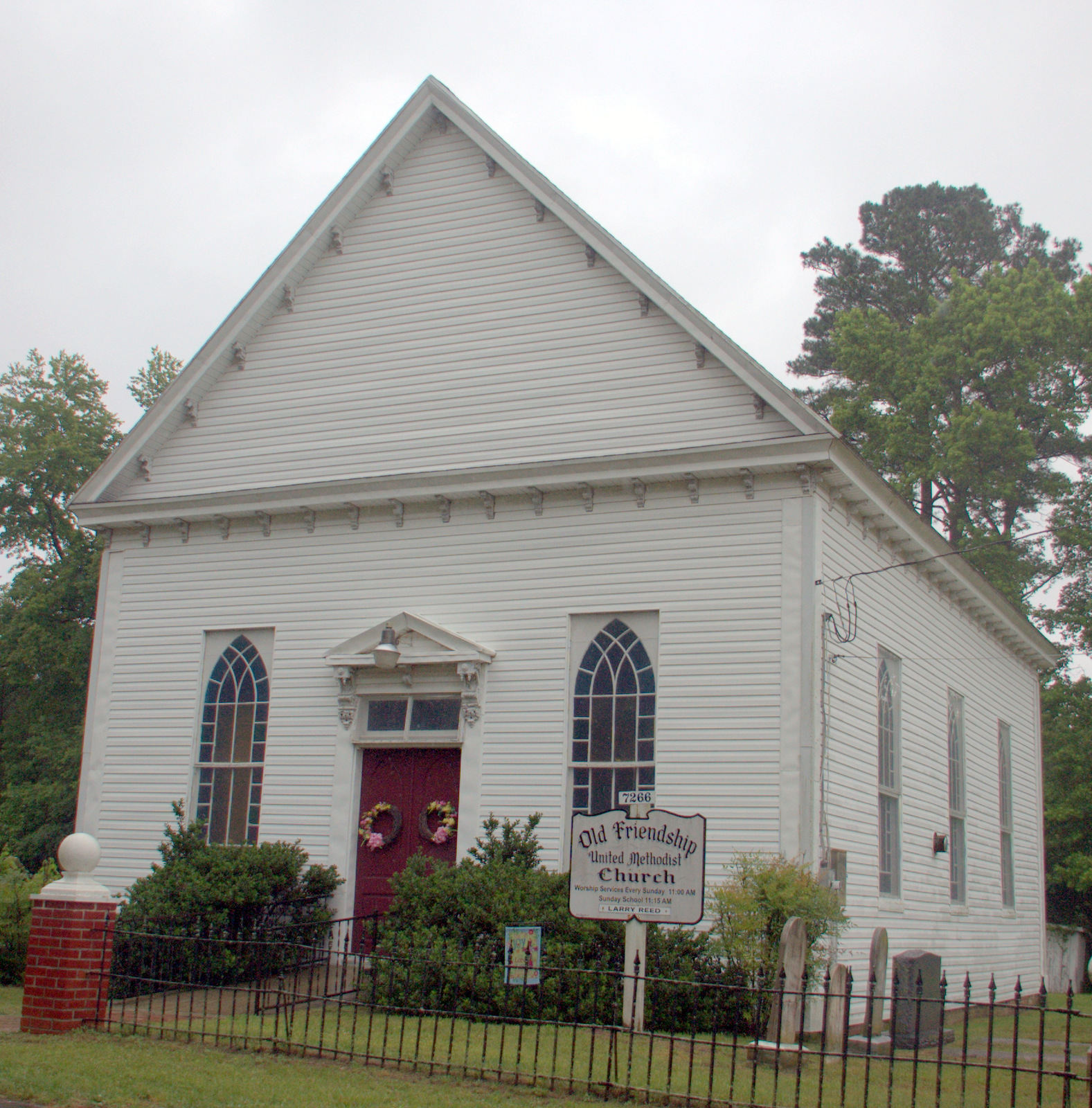

- Location within Maryland Location within the United States
- Location: Meadow Bridge Rd., West Post Office, Maryland
- Coordinates: 38°13′25″N 75°35′13″W
- Area: 1 acre (0.40 ha)
- Built: 1866
- Architect: Bounds, Jones; Dykes, William
- Architectural style: Italianate, Greek Revival
- NRHP reference No.: 95001490
- Added to NRHP: January 4, 1996

Old Friendship United Methodist Church is a historic United Methodist church located in West Post Office, Worcester County, Maryland. It is a one-story, gable-front, frame building erected in 1866. It received improvements through the 1920s and reflects rural interpretations of the Italianate and Greek Revival styles. Surrounding the church is a small churchyard containing several hundred 19th and 20th century grave markers.

It was listed on the National Register of Historic Places in 1996.
