= Sandy Point Site =

- U.S. National Register of Historic Places
- Nearest city: Ocean City, Maryland
- NRHP reference No.: 75000932
- Added to NRHP: April 28, 1975

The Sandy Point Site, or Sandy Point Archeological Site, is an archaeological site near Ocean City in Worcester County, Maryland. It contains the southernmost component of the Townsend Series on the Delmarva Peninsula. It is also one of the few known Woodland period village sites in this area. These traits are shared by the nearby Buckingham Archeological Site.

It was listed on the National Register of Historic Places in 1975.
