= Genesar =

Historic house in Maryland, United States

- U.S. National Register of Historic Places
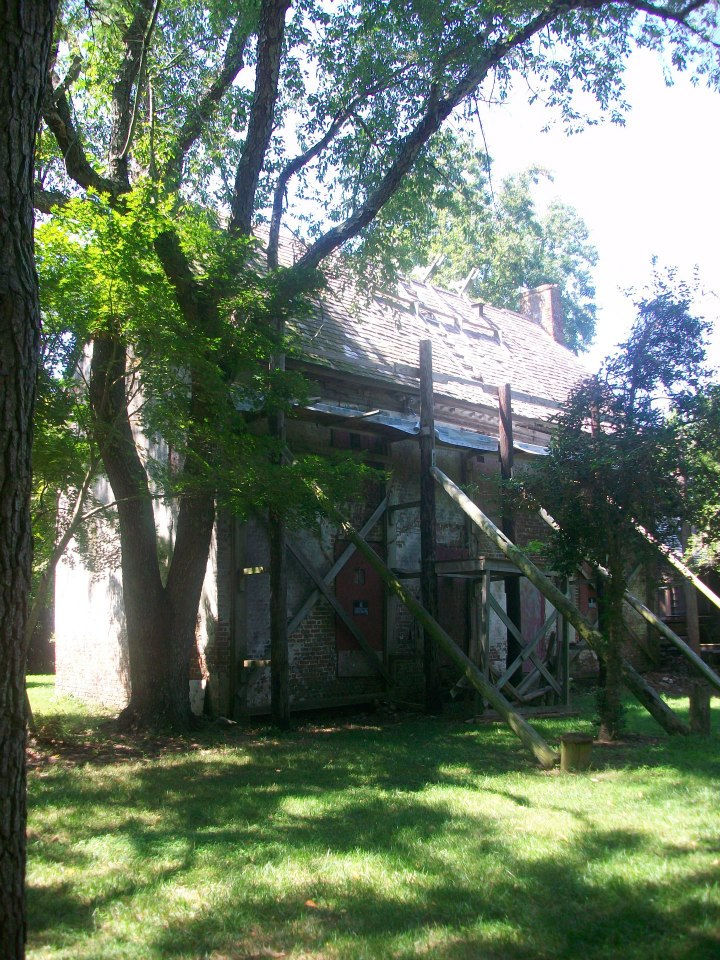
- Genesar, February 2014

- Location within Maryland Location within the United States
- Location: Stephen Decatur Highway (MD 611), near Berlin, Maryland
- Coordinates: 38.23521°N 75.1894°W
- Area: 16 acres (6.5 ha)
- Built: 1732
- NRHP reference No.: 71000381
- Added to NRHP: September 17, 1971

Genesar is a historic home located near Berlin, Worcester County, Maryland, United States. It is a 2 1/2-story brick dwelling. It represents the hold-over forms of medieval work and the earliest development towards the more formal Georgian ideals in plan and design.

Genesar was listed on the National Register of Historic Places in 1971.
