= Buckingham Archeological Site =

- U.S. National Register of Historic Places
- Nearest city: Berlin, Maryland
- NRHP reference No.: 75000930
- Added to NRHP: February 24, 1975

Buckingham Archeological Site is an archaeological site near Berlin in Worcester County, Maryland. It is one of the few known Woodland period village sites in the coastal marsh areas of the Atlantic Coast section of Maryland. The site falls within the general vicinity of an Assateague Indian town. It is located four miles east of the Sandy Point Site, both including the southernmost reported occurrence of Townsend Series ceramics on the coastal section of the Eastern Shore.

It was listed on the National Register of Historic Places in 1975.
