= Caleb's Discovery =

Historic house in Maryland, United States

- U.S. National Register of Historic Places
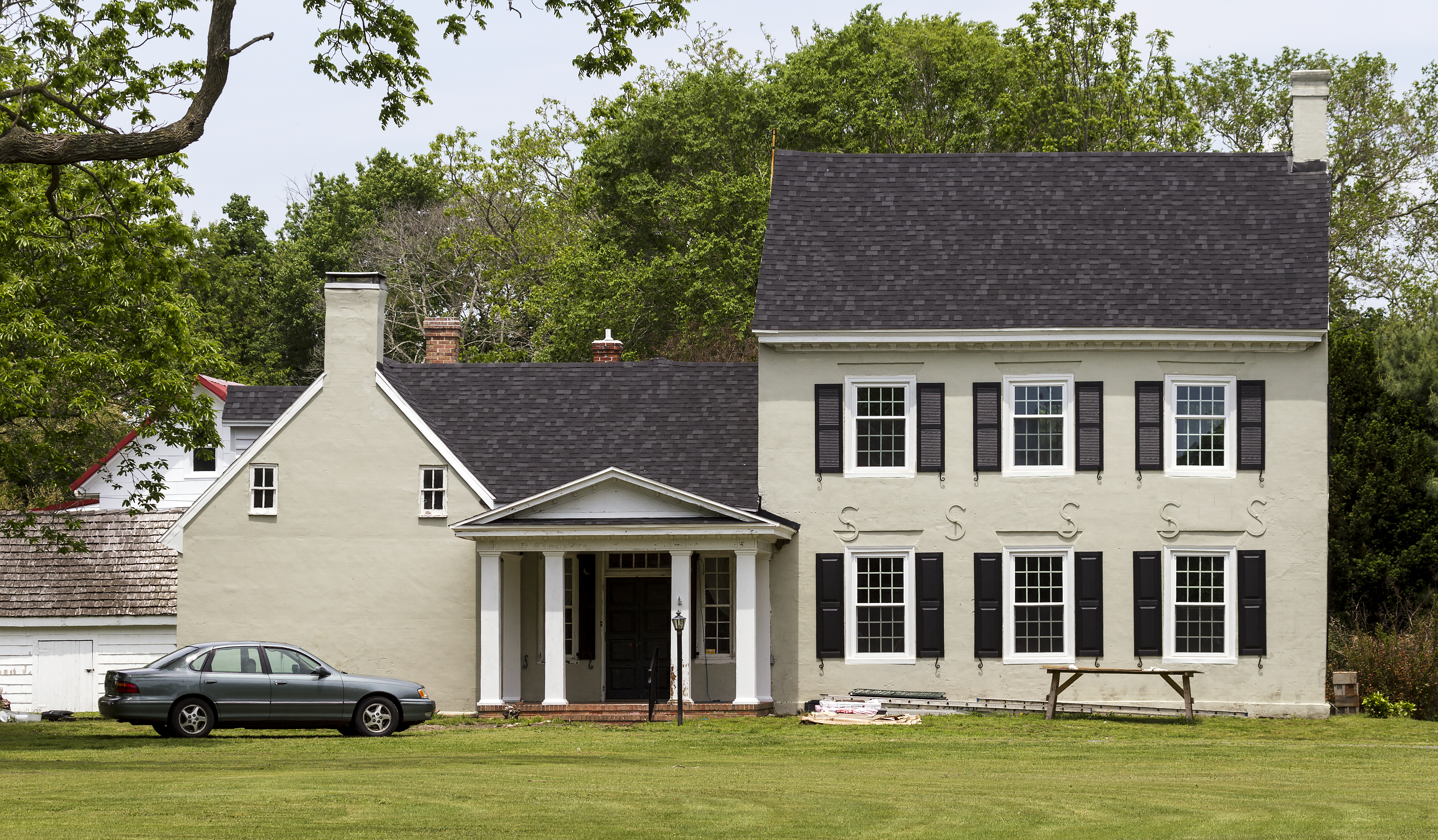
- Caleb's Discovery from US Route 50

- Location within Maryland Location within the United States
- Location: Ocean Gateway (US 50), Berlin, Maryland
- Coordinates: 38°20′0″N 75°12′30″W
- Area: 12 acres (4.9 ha)
- NRHP reference No.: 75000931
- Added to NRHP: May 27, 1975

Caleb's Discovery is a historic home located two miles west of Berlin, Worcester County, Maryland. The house consists of two sections, the 1 1/2-story kitchen wing, dating from the early 18th century, and the 2 1/2-story living room wing, dating from about 1820. It is a good illustration of the incorporation of an early house into a later structure without the loss of the earlier building's identity.

It was listed on the National Register of Historic Places in 1975.
