= Burley Manor =

Historic house in Maryland, United States

- U.S. National Register of Historic Places
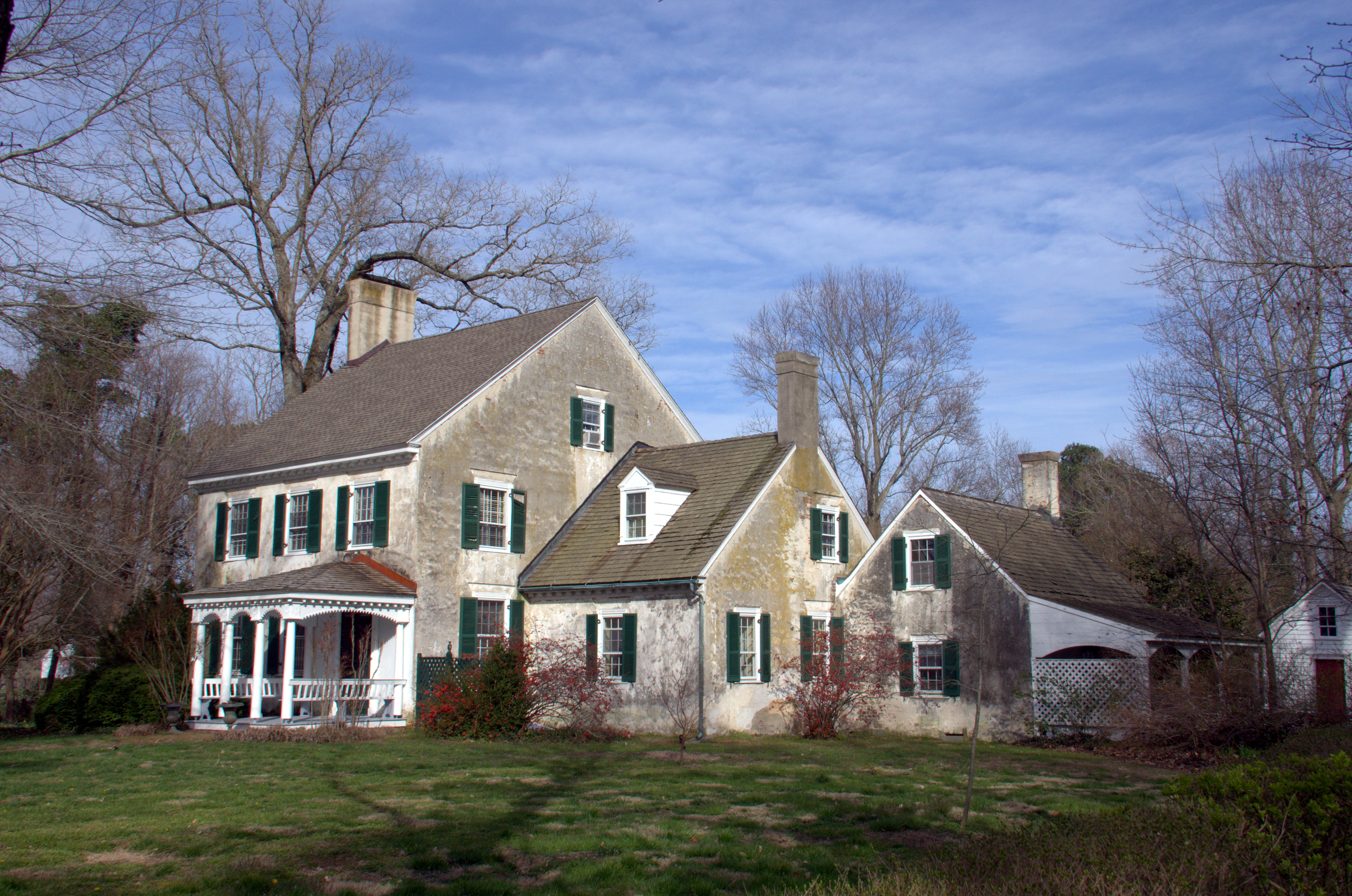

- Location within Maryland Location within the United States
- Location: 313 S. Main St. Berlin, Maryland
- Coordinates: 38°19′10″N 75°13′10″W
- Area: 4 acres (1.6 ha)
- Built: 1832
- Architectural style: Federal
- NRHP reference No.: 74000979
- Added to NRHP: July 7, 1974

Burley Manor is a historic home located in Berlin, Worcester County, Maryland. It is a Federal-style brick house built about 1832.

It was listed on the National Register of Historic Places in 1974.
