= Fassitt House =

Historic house in Maryland, United States

- U.S. National Register of Historic Places
- Location within Maryland Location within the United States
- Location: 12025 Fassitt Lane, Berlin, Maryland
- Coordinates: 38°17′9″N 75°8′47″W
- Built: 1730
- Architectural style: Georgian
- NRHP reference No.: 96000921
- Added to NRHP: August 22, 1996

Fassitt House is a historic home located at Berlin, Worcester County, Maryland, United States. It is a 1 1/2-story Flemish bond brick house erected about 1669 on property bordering Sinepuxent Bay. The main side features a carefully laid decorative checkerboard brick pattern. The interior features fine examples of Georgian raised-panel woodwork finish in the first-floor rooms. The property includes two historic outbuildings, a shingled frame smokehouse and a log corncrib, and a modern one-story guest house.

Fassitt House was listed on the National Register of Historic Places in 1996.
