= Berlin Commercial District =

Historic district in Maryland, United States

- U.S. National Register of Historic Places
- U.S. Historic district
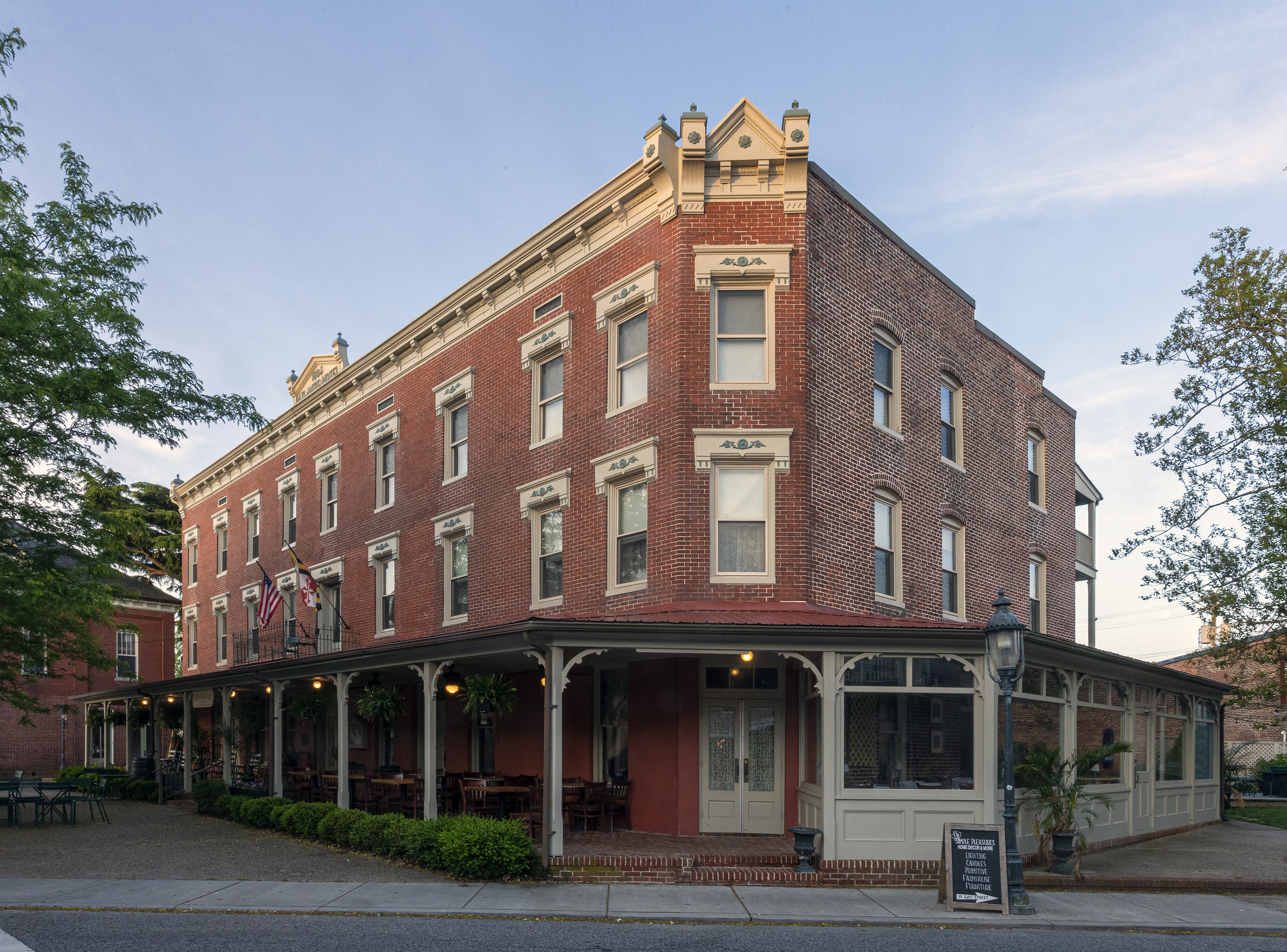
- The 1895-built Atlantic Hotel within the Berlin Commercial District

- Location within Maryland Location within the United States
- Location: Main, Broad, Williams, Bay, Pitts and Commerce Sts., Berlin, Maryland
- Coordinates: 38°19′29″N 75°13′9″W
- Area: 8 acres (3.2 ha)
- NRHP reference No.: 80001844
- Added to NRHP: April 17, 1980

The Berlin Commercial District is a historic district in Berlin, Worcester County, Maryland. It consists of a collection of approximately 47 late-19th-century commercial buildings. They are small-scaled, one-to-three-story buildings that occupy both sides of the main thoroughfare and its secondary arterials. The buildings form a visually cohesive and pleasing streetscape, the majority of which are constructed in the row fashion with party or common walls.

It was added to the National Register of Historic Places in 1980.
