= Henry's Grove =

Historic house in Maryland, United States

- U.S. National Register of Historic Places
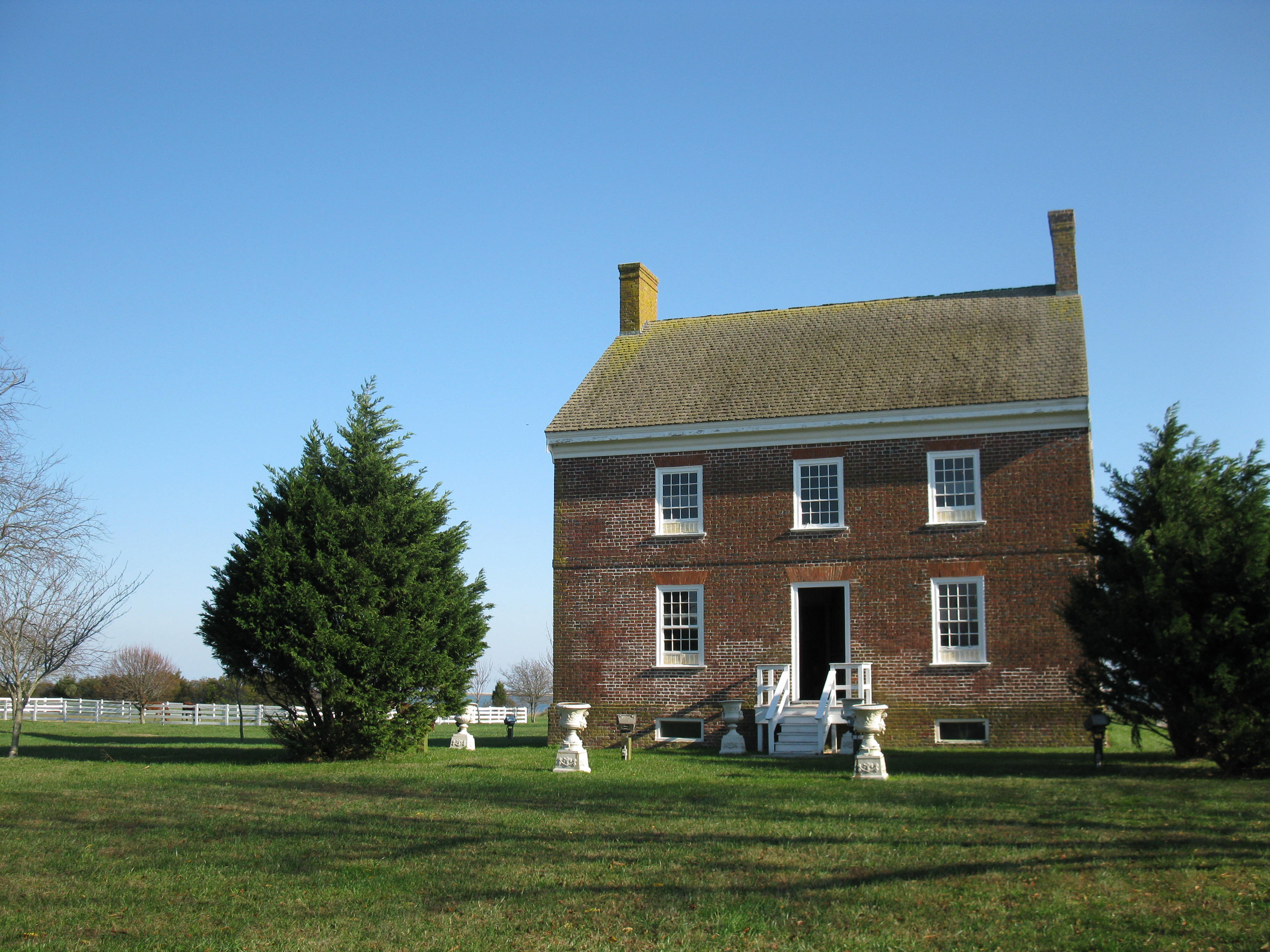
- Henry's Grove in 2009

- Location within Maryland Location within the United States
- Location: Stephen Decatur Highway (MD 611), Berlin, Maryland
- Coordinates: 38°16′10″N 75°9′1″W
- Area: 76.1 acres (30.8 ha)
- Built: 1792
- NRHP reference No.: 84001891
- Added to NRHP: September 13, 1984

Henry's Grove is a historic home located at Berlin, Worcester County, Maryland, United States. It was built in 1792, and is a 2 1/2-story gable-roofed brick house with all walls laid in Flemish bond. The house retains virtually all of its original interior detailing. Also on the property are a 20th-century frame tenant house and four frame outbuildings. It was built for a planter, John Fassitt, whose initials and the date 1792 are inscribed on a plaque in a gable end.

Henry's Grove was listed on the National Register of Historic Places in 1984.
