= Williams Grove =

Historic house in Maryland, United States

- U.S. National Register of Historic Places
- Location within Maryland Location within the United States
- Location: 11842 Porfin Drive, Berlin, Maryland
- Coordinates: 38°15′40″N 75°9′16″W
- Area: 0.8 acres (0.32 ha)
- Architectural style: Federal, Greek Revival
- NRHP reference No.: 96000919
- Added to NRHP: August 22, 1996

Williams Grove is a historic home located at Berlin, Worcester County, Maryland, United States. It is a two-story, three-part house built in three principal stages. The construction sequence began about 1810 with a two-story, two-bay frame house with a single-story wing, that forms the center of the house. The house was expanded first during the mid 19th century and in the early 1970s, a two-story kitchen and garage wing was added. The exterior is covered with cypress shingles.

Williams Grove was listed on the National Register of Historic Places in 1996.
