= Mattapony =

Former hundred in Worcester County, Maryland

Coordinates: 38°2′20″N 75°28′40″W

Mattapony locally /ˌmætəpəˈnaɪ/ was a former hundred in Worcester County, Maryland.

== History ==
Before the erection of Worcester County in 1742, Somerset County (erected in 1666) was, like other colonial counties, divided into "hundreds", including Mattapony. Following American independence, Maryland's hundreds were converted into election districts, and Mattapony became the Sandy Hill, later the Stockton, election district.

== Geography ==
Mattapony Hundred's original borders were the Pocomoke River on the west and northwest, Corker's Creek on the northeast, Chincoteague Bay on the east, and Accomack County, Virginia on the south. During the colonial period, Mattapony Hundred was divided by the creation of Pitts Creek Hundred out of its western third.

Towns and villages in the hundred included present-day Girdletree, Rabbit Knaw, Big Mill (also known as Welbourne), Goodwill (formerly known as Davis Cross Roads), Klej Grange (named Lindseyville until 1878), Stockton (known as Sandy Hill until 1872), and Pocomoke City (known as Stevens Landing or Stevens Ferry, then as Newtown until 1888). Three main roads traversed Mattapony: the seaside post road from Delaware ran via Snow Hill through Girdletree and Stockton into Virginia (current Maryland Route 12 follows its approximate path), a road from Mattapony Landing on the Pocomoke River to Stockton via Klej Grange, and another from Snow Hill to Pocomoke City via Klej Grange and Goodwill.

== Name ==
"Mattapony" was one of the most widely used place-names of the Algonquian Indians in Maryland and Virginia. As early as 1639, a "Mattapony Path" was known in St. Mary's County--it led to Mataponi Creek, a tributary of the Patuxent River. "Place Names of Maryland" states that the Algonquin meaning of "matta" was "joined," or "junction," and "apo" was "water," "current," or "expanse of water," i.e., "meeting of waters at a sand spit". Mayre states in the Maryland Historical Magazine, in an article entitled "Sea Coast of Maryland":

In the interest of accuracy it should be admitted that this place-name may refer to Mattapony inlet, as the heads of these inlets seem to have been close to one another.

Not restricted to Worcester County, at least two properties on the neighboring Eastern Shore of Virginia were also called "Mattapony". Likewise, the Mattaponi River in Virginia, called after the tribe of the same name, joins with the Pamunkey to form the York River, and, as noted above, Mataponi Creek flows into the Patuxent River in Prince George's County, Maryland.
