= Maryland Route 365 =

State highway in Maryland, United States

Maryland Route 365
- Maryland Route 365 highlighted in red

Route information
- Maintained by MDSHA
- Length: 6.29 mi (10.12 km)
- Existed: 1927–present
- Tourist routes: Cape to Cape Scenic Byway

Major junctions
- West end: US 113 Bus. in Snow Hill
- US 113 near Snow Hill
- East end: Public Landing Wharf Road at Public Landing

Location
- Country: United States
- State: Maryland
- Counties: Worcester

Highway system
- Maryland highway system; Interstate; US; State; Scenic Byways
| ← MD 364 | → MD 366 |

Maryland Route 365 (MD 365) is a state highway in the U.S. state of Maryland. Known for most of its length as Public Landing Road, the state highway runs 6.29 miles (10.12 km) from U.S. Route 113 Business (US 113 Business) in Snow Hill east to Public Landing Wharf Road at Public Landing. MD 365 was constructed between 1924 and 1929. A superstreet intersection was built at US 113 in 2015.

== Route description ==
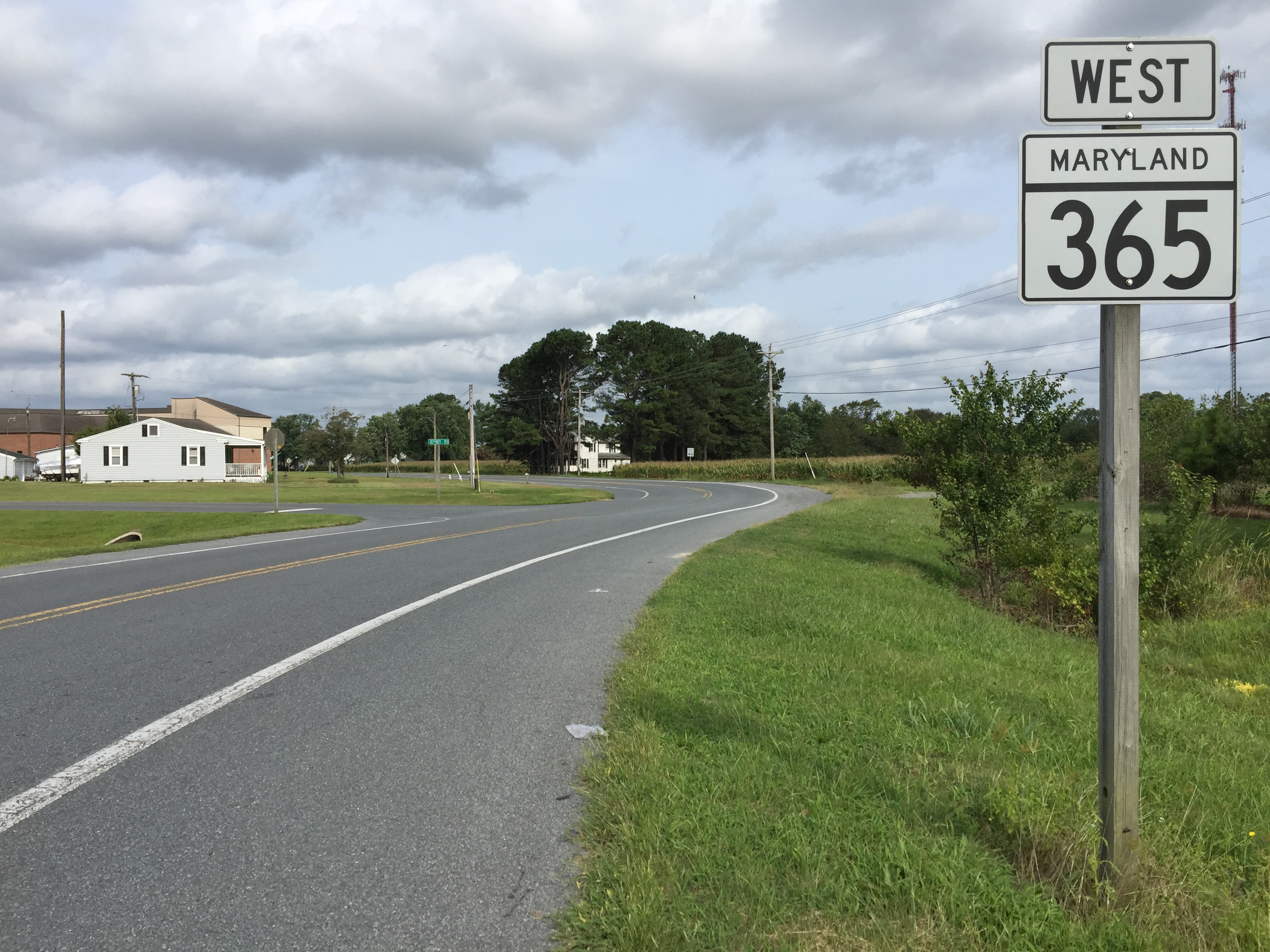
View west along MD 365 at US 113 near Snow Hill

MD 365 begins at an intersection with US 113 Business (Market Street) just east of downtown Snow Hill. The state highway heads east as two-lane undivided Bay Street. MD 365 crosses the Snow Hill Line of the Maryland and Delaware Railroad at-grade before leaving the town limits of Snow Hill, where the name of the highway changes to Public Landing Road. After passing the Worcester County Recreation Center, the state highway intersects US 113 (Worcester Highway) at a superstreet intersection, in which MD 365 traffic must turn right, use U-turn ramps along US 113, and turn right again to continue on MD 365. Following this, the route crosses Pattys Branch. MD 365 passes through the hamlets of Mount Wesley and Spence before entering Public Landing. The state highway reaches its eastern terminus at Public Landing Wharf Road adjacent to the shore of Chincoteague Bay.

== History ==
Construction began on MD 365 from Snow Hill in 1924. The highway was completed to Mount Wesley in 1927 and to Public Landing in 1929. In 2015, a superstreet intersection was constructed at US 113.

== Junction list ==
The entire route is in Worcester County.

| Location | mi | km | Destinations | Notes |
|---|---|---|---|---|
| Snow Hill | 0.00 | 0.00 | US 113 Bus. (Market Street) to MD 12 – Salisbury, Berlin, Ocean City | Western terminus |
| Snow Hill | 1.03 | 1.66 | US 113 (Worcester Highway) – Pocomoke, Berlin | Superstreet intersection |
| Public Landing | 6.29 | 10.12 | Public Landing Wharf Road north | Eastern terminus |
1.000 mi = 1.609 km; 1.000 km = 0.621 mi
