= E.A. Vaughn Wildlife Management Area =

State Wildlife Management Area in Worcester County, Maryland

Coordinates: 38°4′39″N 75°22′49″W

- Interactive map of E.A. Vaughn Wildlife Management Area
- Location: Worcester County, Maryland, USA
- Nearest city: Snow Hill, Maryland
- Governing body: Maryland Department of Natural Resources

E.A. Vaughn Wildlife Management Area is a state wildlife management area (WMA) of Maryland that consists of two separate parcels of land on Chincoteague Bay in Worcester County, between the villages of Girdletree and Stockton.

From the 1940s to the 1960s, E.A. Vaughn WMA was a game farm where a number of pheasant species were raised and released. It was also an area where wildlife biologists experimented with plants and planting arrangements which would most benefit wildlife.

The area was formerly named the Girdletree Wildlife Management Area, but the name was changed in 1964 to honor Ernest A. Vaughn, the former director of the Maryland Game and Inland Fish Commission.

Today, woodcock, hairy and downy woodpeckers, and warblers inhabit the extensive forest. In the marshes, great blue, green and little blue herons, as well as common and snowy egrets, hunt for fish. Black ducks, mallards, Canada and snow geese, and other waterfowl use the marshes and open water found in and around the area. White-tailed deer, gray squirrels, mourning doves, bobwhite quail, and cottontail rabbits are plentiful. Wood ducks are especially attracted to an area of forest deliberately flooded in the fall when the trees are dormant, as are frogs and toads, turtles and snakes. Endangered Delmarva fox squirrels were released on the area and have been thriving there for a decade. Migrating hawks can be seen in the fall as they travel the Atlantic Flyway.

The eastern end of E.A. Vaughn Wildlife Management Area is covered by an extensive network of man-made canals that generally run northeast-to-southwest.

Hunting and trapping in season, and fishing, crabbing, hiking, and biking are all permitted in the WMA.
