= Naval Air Station Patuxent River =

Military naval air station and flight test centre in Maryland, United States

- Trapnell Field
- St. Mary’s County, Maryland in the United States
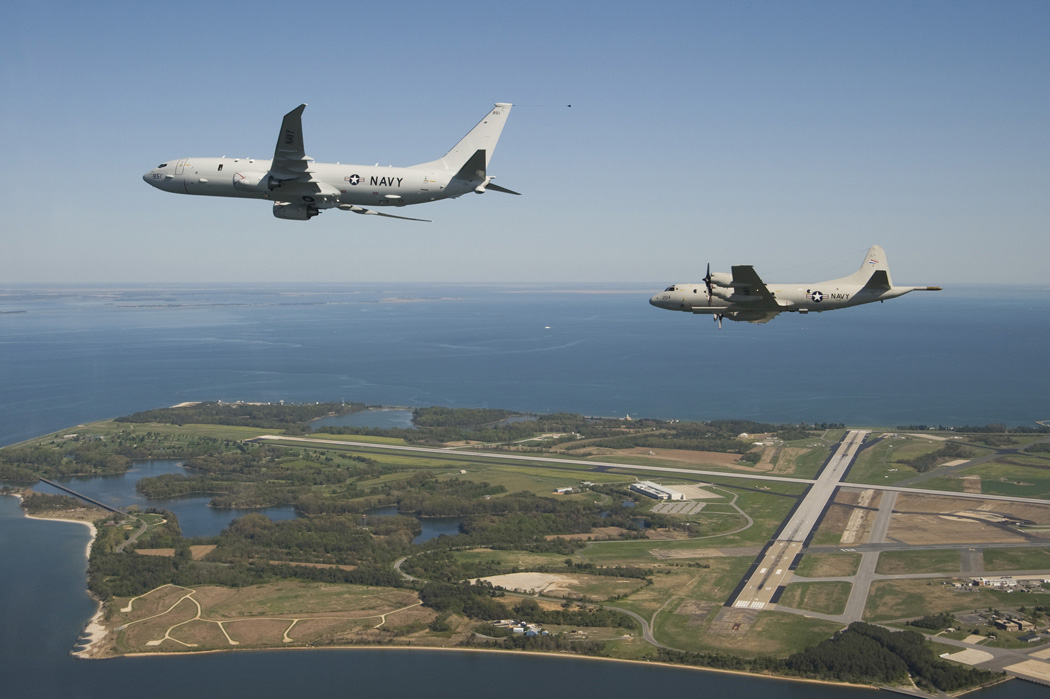
- A US Navy P-8A Poseidon flies with a P-3C Orion, prior to landing at NAS Patuxent River, 2010.

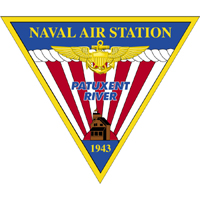

Site information
- Type: Naval Air Station
- Owner: Department of Defense
- Operator: US Navy
- Controlled by: Naval District Washington
- Condition: Operational
- Website: Official website

Location
- Location in Maryland NAS Patuxent River (the United States)
- Coordinates: 38°17′10″N 76°24′42″W

Site history
- Built: 1942 – 1943
- In use: 1943 – present

Garrison information
- Current commander: Captain John Brabazon
- Garrison: Naval Test Wing Atlantic

Airfield information
- Identifiers: IATA: NHK, ICAO: KNHK, FAA LID: NHK, WMO: 72404
- Elevation: 11.8 metres (39 ft) AMSL
Runways
Direction	Length and surface
6/24	3,596.3 metres (11,799 ft) asphalt
14/32	2,966.3 metres (9,732 ft) asphalt
2/20	1,530.4 metres (5,021 ft) asphalt

Naval Air Station Patuxent River (IATA: NHK, ICAO: KNHK, FAA LID: NHK), also known as NAS Pax River, is a United States naval air station in St. Mary’s County, Maryland, on the Chesapeake Bay near the mouth of the Patuxent River.

It is home to Headquarters, Naval Air Systems Command (NAVAIR), the U.S. Naval Test Pilot School, the Atlantic Test Range, Patuxent River Naval Air Museum, and serves as a center for test and evaluation and systems acquisition relating to naval aviation. The station also operates a small outlying field, NOLF Webster.

Commissioned on April 1, 1943, on land largely acquired through eminent domain, the air station grew rapidly in response to World War II and continued to evolve through the Cold War to the present.

== Geography ==
The 6,400 acres (26 km^{2}) Naval Air Station Patuxent River site is located in Lexington Park, Maryland, at the confluence of the Patuxent River and the Chesapeake Bay on a peninsula known as Cedar Point.

=== Environmental contamination ===
Naval Air Station Patuxent River (PAX) operated several landfills and other historical disposal areas. The landfills received solid and hazardous wastes. This included spent oil absorbents, solvents, paints, antifreeze, thinners, pesticides and photo lab wastes, sewage treatment plant sludge, cesspool wastes. In the late 1950s, DDT was sprayed and from 1962–1989 various pesticides, including fungicides and insecticides and herbicides, were used, contaminating the ground surface water and groundwater. Base residential housing was within a quarter mile.

In May 1994, PAX was added to the Superfund program's National Priorities List.

As of 2022, several areas were considered "cleaned up" after removing contaminated soil, but there are ongoing maintenance activities such as monitoring and treatment of landfill gas, groundwater, and using land use controls and institutional controls, eg. restricting fish consumption. At the remaining areas, investigations and remedy selection activities continue.

For example, in April 2021 the Navy disclosed at a NAS Patuxent River Restoration Advisory Board meeting that 84,757 ppt of PFOS were detected in the groundwater at Webster Field.

== History ==
=== Genesis: 1937 ===
Prior to 1937 the area was prime farmland, consisting of several large plantations, Mattapony, Susquehanna, and Cedar Point, as well as numerous tenant and sharecropper properties and a few clusters of vacation homes. The Cedar Point community included several churches, a post office, and a gas station. Some of the old homes now serve as quarters for Navy personnel stationed there.

In 1937, the Navy's Bureau of Aeronautics sought to consolidate aviation test programs, previously being conducted at several stations, including Dahlgren and Norfolk, the Washington Navy Yard, Naval Air Station Anacostia in Washington, D.C., and the Naval Aircraft Factory in Philadelphia, Pennsylvania. Cedar Point was selected due to its remote location on the coastline, well removed from air traffic congestion, with ample space for weapons testing.

=== 1940s: Wartime urgency ===
==== Fast-track chartering of base and start of construction ====
The onset of American involvement in World War II spurred establishment of the new air station. Rear Admiral John Henry Towers, Chief of Bureau of Aeronautics, requested approval and authorization to begin construction on December 22, 1941. Secretary of the Navy Frank Knox gave approval on 7 January 1942. Construction began on 4 April 1942.

==== Hardships for original civilian residents ====
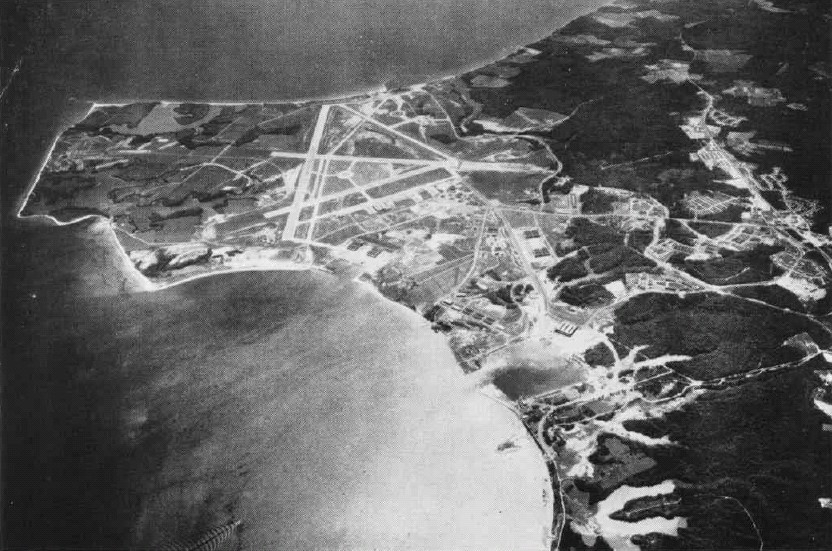
Aerial view of NAS Patuxent River in the mid-1940s

The original civilian residents had about a month, until 1 March 1942, to relocate, as the federal government purchased all the land at a cost of $712,287 for 6,412 acres (26 km^{2}). Many residents were forced to sell land that had been in their families for generations. Some families had roots in the area going back 300 years. These included traditional farming, crabbing and fishing families and there were protests. National wartime urgency was felt in Washington at the time to take precedence, and the process of eminent domain went through.

==== Rehabilitation of rail line ====
A lack of transportation in Saint Mary's County led the Navy to acquire and revitalize a branchline called the Washington, Brandywine and Point Lookout Railroad, aka "The Farmers' Railroad", from Brandywine to Mechanicsville, Maryland, in June 1942 and build an extension south from Mechanicsville to the air station. Known as the U.S. Government Railroad, the rail line was steam-powered and operated south of Brandywine for exclusive official use until 1954, when the Pennsylvania Railroad assumed operation of the line. Rail service ended in 1965, and the line was scrapped, although the right-of-way is still very visible.

==== Extension of highway ====
A highway extension to the new air station was required by the project—250,000 tons of material were transported by either truck or water routes during a year of construction.

==== Construction boom town ====
Employing some 7,000 at its peak of construction, the area had a Gold Rush "boom town" feel as local residents were joined by workers from all over the country, eager to get on the high-paying jobs on station.

==== Foundation ====
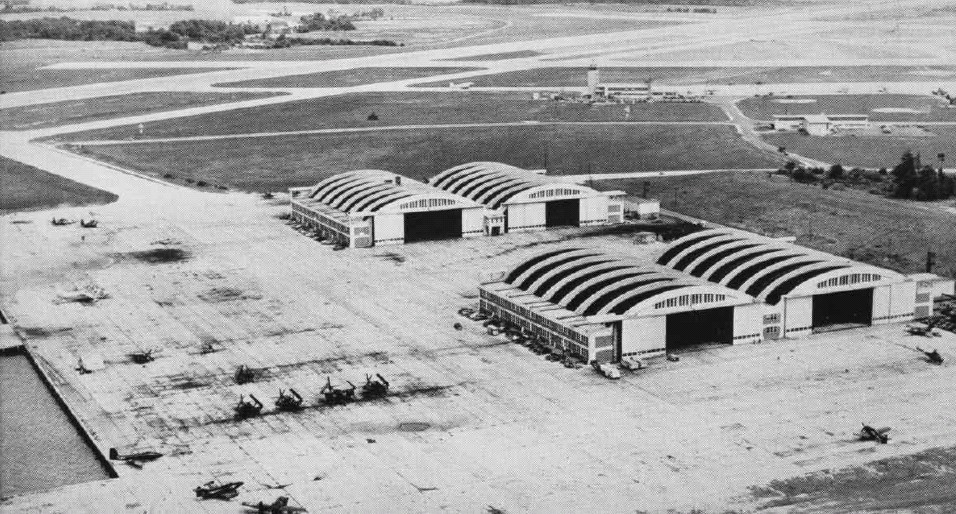
An aerial view of the hangars in the late 1940s

On 20 October 1942, U.S. Marines first arrived and took over security. Today, the station utilizes Navy Masters-At-Arms (MA) and Navy Civilian Police Department of Defense Police for standard local law enforcement and the Naval Criminal Investigative Service (NCIS) for high-profile criminal investigations.

During construction, housing needs far outstripped supply, and barracks were built for workers on the station. Later, several housing areas were erected off station for workers and their families in Lexington Park, formerly Jarboesville, named in honor of the USS Lexington, the Navy's second aircraft carrier, lost during the Battle of the Coral Sea on 8 May 1942. The town's expansion had begun.

The station was commissioned "U.S. Naval Air Station, Patuxent River, Maryland" on 1 April 1943. In a ceremony presided over by RADM John S. McCain, Sr., then chief of the Bureau of Aeronautics, Patuxent River was referred to as "the most needed station in the Navy." The unofficial name had been Cedar Point or the Naval Air Station at Cedar Point, but officials were concerned about possible confusion with the Marine Corps Air Station Cherry Point, North Carolina, so the new facility was named for the adjacent river.

In 1945 the Test Pilot School was established with the Navy's Flight Test Group transferred from Naval Air Station Anacostia, Washington, DC to NAS Patuxent River.

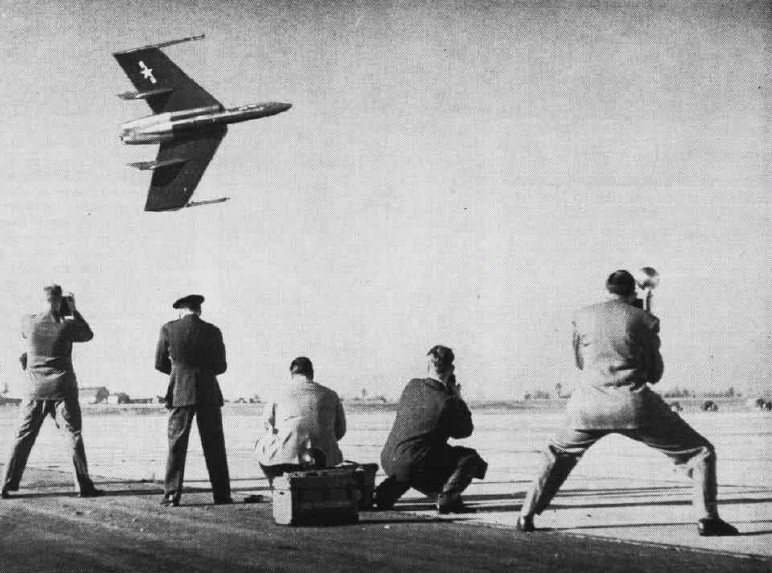
A Vought XF7U-1 Cutlass prototype being photographed by the press on 18 November 1948 at NAS Patuxent River

On June 16, 1945, the Naval Air Test Center was established as a separate entity, incorporating flight test and other test groups, at the Naval Air Station.

=== 1950s: Flight test center and test pilot school facilities launched ===
The base became a center for testing as several facilities were constructed throughout the 1950s and 1960s, including the facilities for United States Naval Test Pilot School (1958), the Weapons Systems Test Division (1960), and the Propulsion System Evaluation Facility. The base also served as the testing facility for the V-22 Osprey.

In addition to its role in testing naval aircraft, during the 1950s to 1970s Patuxent River served as an operational base for a Transport Squadron - VR-1, a TACAMO squadron - VQ-4, Airborne Training Unit Atlantic - AEWTULANT, and VW-11, VW-13 AN VW-15 and a number of Patrol Squadrons including VP-8, VP-44, VP-49, VP-24, VP-30 and VP-68.

=== 1965: Addition of reconnaissance squadrons ===
By 1965, reconnaissance Squadron VQ-4, based at NAS Patuxent River, began using Lockheed C-130s equipped with special communications equipment to perform their around-the-clock Take Charge and Move Out (TACAMO) mission. VQ-4 provided long-range, very-low-frequency communications relay between the National Command Center and the ballistic missile submarine fleet. Two LTV A-7 Corsair II aircraft made the transatlantic crossing from NAS Patuxent River to Évreux, France, in 1967, racking up 3,327 nautical miles in just over seven hours, an unofficial long-distance, non-refueled flight by light attack jet aircraft.

Cooperation with the British led to transatlantic visits to Pax River by RAF squadrons.

=== 1970s: Development of major naval aircraft ===
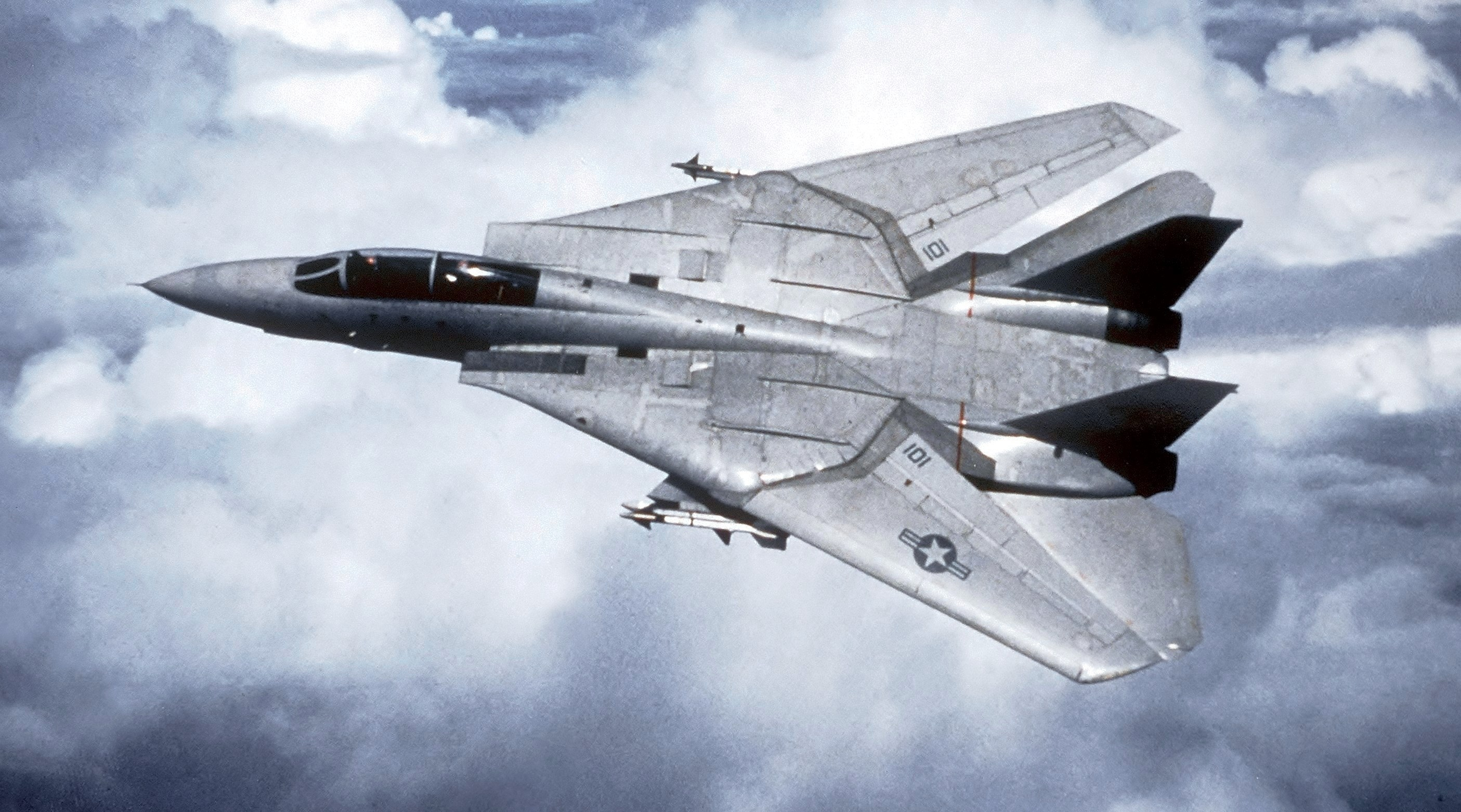
A F-14 Tomcat in flight. Tomcats underwent major development and testing at NAS Patuxent River.

Research and development at NAS Patuxent River forged ahead in the 1970s. The Grumman F-14 Tomcat, the McDonnell Douglas AV-8B Harrier II jump jet, and the Lockheed P-3 Orion were just a few of the major aircraft programs undergoing the rigorous test and evaluation process at NAS Patuxent River. Helicopter programs also achieved major milestones during the 1970s. The Naval Air Test Center (NATC) at NAS Patuxent River took part in helicopter development and testing for new roles, such as minesweeping. The final flight of the service acceptance trials for the Bell AH-1 SuperCobra gunship was made at NATC Patuxent River.

==== Renaming of the airfield ====
On 1 April 1976, Patuxent River's airfield was named after pioneering aviator VADM Frederick M. Trapnell, a former commander of the Naval Air Test Center at the station. Keynote address speaker, ADM Frederick H. Michaelis, Chief of Naval Material, noted: "All who fly in Navy blue remain indebted to Vice Admiral Trapnell. This field will serve as a living reminder of that debt."

=== 1990s: End of Cold War, base consolidations favor Pax River NAS ===
==== Growth ====
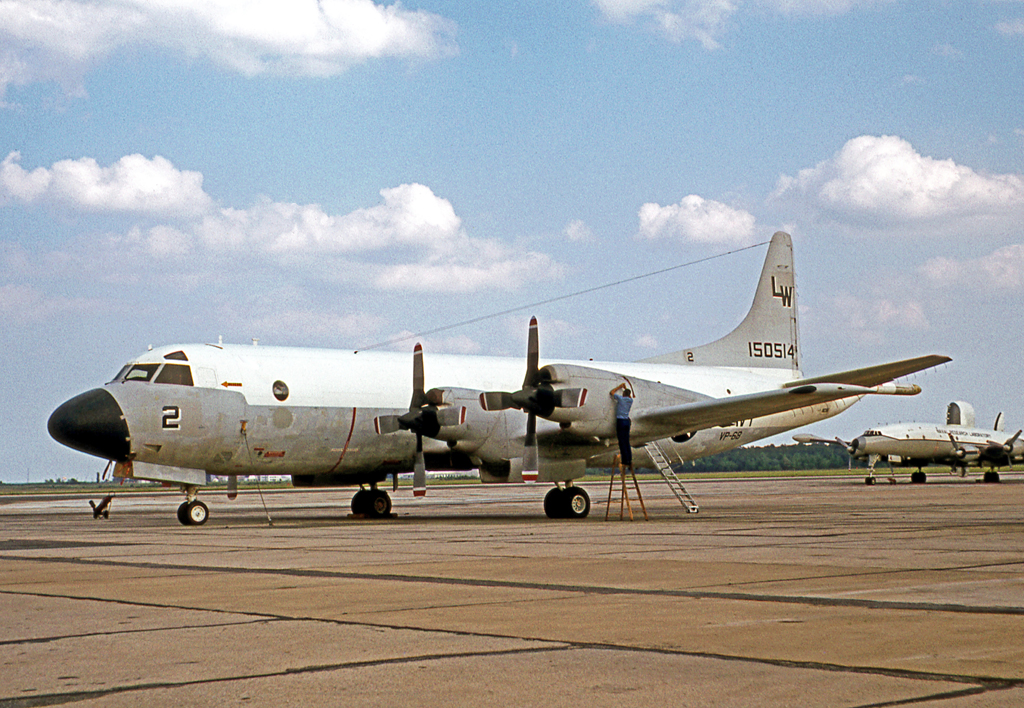
A US Naval Air Reserve Lockheed P-3A Orion of Patrol Squadron 68 (VP-68) at NAS Patuxent River in May 1972

Since the end of the Cold War, the Pentagon's Base Realignment and Closure measures have migrated research and testing facilities for both rotary and fixed-wing aircraft to NAS Patuxent River from decommissioned bases. The complex now hosts over 17,000 people, including active-duty service members, civil-service employees, defense contractor employees, and military dependents.

=== 2000s: Forefront of research, development, and testing ===
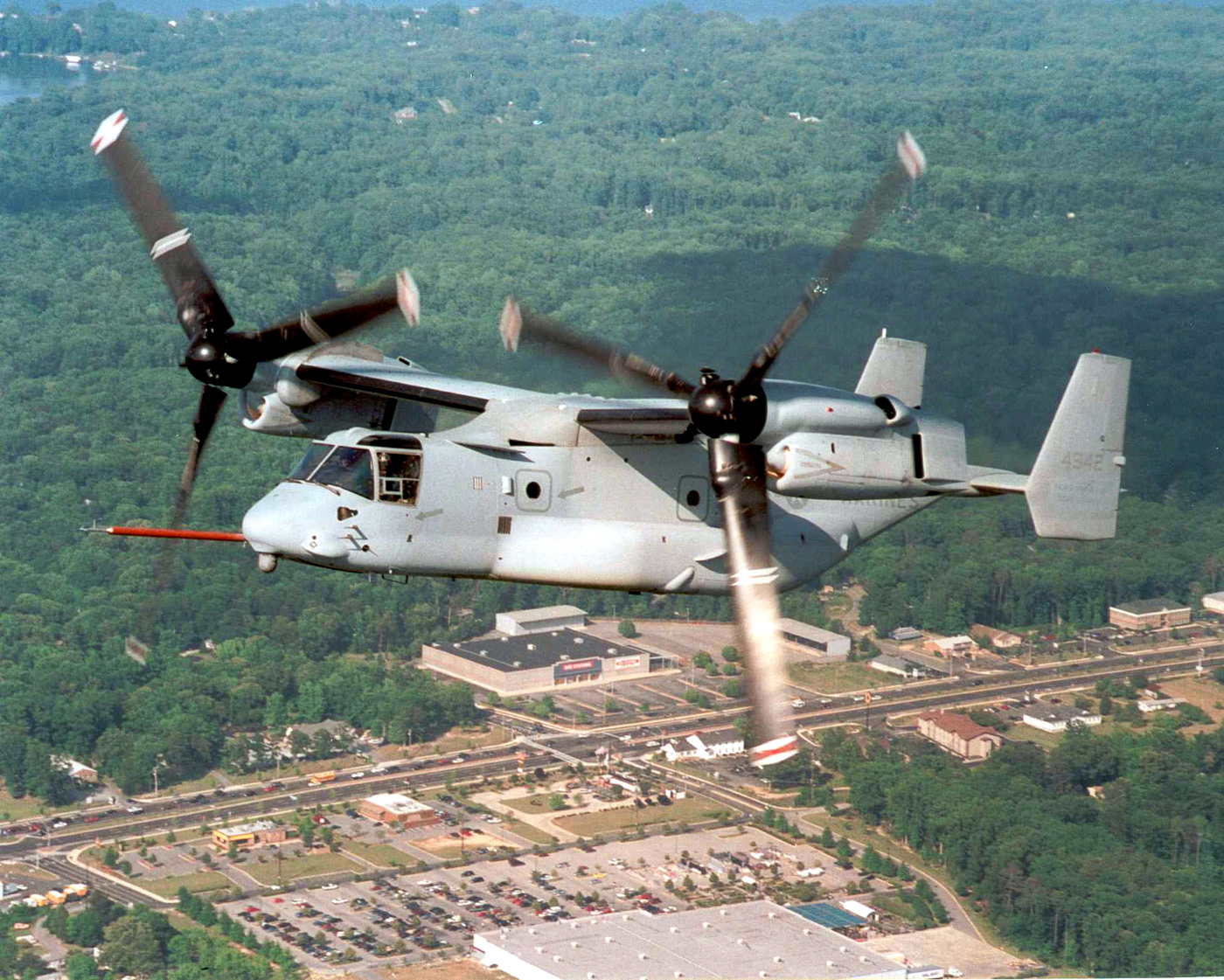
A V-22 Osprey on a test flight, with California, Maryland in the background

In January 1992, the Pax River Station acquired the Aircraft Division of the Naval Air Warfare Center (NAWCAD). The Naval Test Wing Atlantic (NTWL) was already located there, which was a branch of the Naval Air Warfare Center, created in 1991, and located in Washington, DC. Its mission was the development and improvement of weapons. The partnership of these two units led to a "flourishing" of aircraft research and development at Patuxent.

A number of new laboratory facilities on the forefront of research were created: a manned flight simulator, the Aircraft Anechoic Test Facility, the Air Combat Environment Test and Evaluation Facility, the Aircraft Test and Evaluation Facility, and the Captain Steven A. Hazelrigg Flight Test Facility. The physical plant was expanded by new construction: the U.S. Naval Test Pilot School academic building, an Aviation Survival Training Center pool facility and a new air-traffic-control tower.

The base's social infrastructure has grown as well. In 2013, a new, large-size child development center was completed.

In September 2014, Captain Heidi Fleming became the first female commanding officer of NAS Patuxent River, where she served until 2016.

For the future, the researchers are looking in the direction of unmanned flight.

== Tenant commands ==
- Naval Air Systems Command
- U.S. Naval Test Pilot School
- Air Test and Evaluation Squadron 1
- Scientific Development Squadron 1
- Air Test and Evaluation Squadron 20
- Rotary Wing Test Squadron 21
- Air Test and Evaluation Squadron 23

== See also ==
- Patuxent River Naval Air Museum
- List of United States Navy airfields
- List of Superfund sites in Maryland
- Naval Recreation Center Solomons at the Solomons Annex

== Sources ==
- "FAA Airport Form 5010 for NHK" (PDF). FAA.
