= Maryland Route 366 =

Highway in Maryland

Maryland Route 366
- Maryland Route 366 highlighted in red

Route information
- Maintained by MDSHA
- Length: 11.17 mi (17.98 km)
- Existed: 1927–present
- Tourist routes: Cape to Cape Scenic Byway

Major junctions
- West end: US 13 Bus. in Pocomoke City
- US 13 in Pocomoke City; MD 12 in Stockton
- East end: Dead end in George Island Landing

Location
- Country: United States
- State: Maryland
- Counties: Worcester

Highway system
- Maryland highway system; Interstate; US; State; Scenic Byways
← MD 365	→ MD 367

Maryland Route 366 (MD 366) is a state highway in the U.S. state of Maryland. Known for much of its length as Stockton Road, the state highway runs 11.17 miles (17.98 km) from U.S. Route 13 Business (US 13 Business) in Pocomoke City east to George Island Landing on Chincoteague Bay. MD 366 is the main east–west highway of southern Worcester County, connecting US 13 in Pocomoke City with MD 12 in Stockton. The state highway was constructed starting in the mid-1910s from the Pocomoke City end. MD 366 was completed between Pocomoke City and Stockton in the early 1920s. The state highway was extended east to George Island Landing in the mid-1930s.

== Route description ==
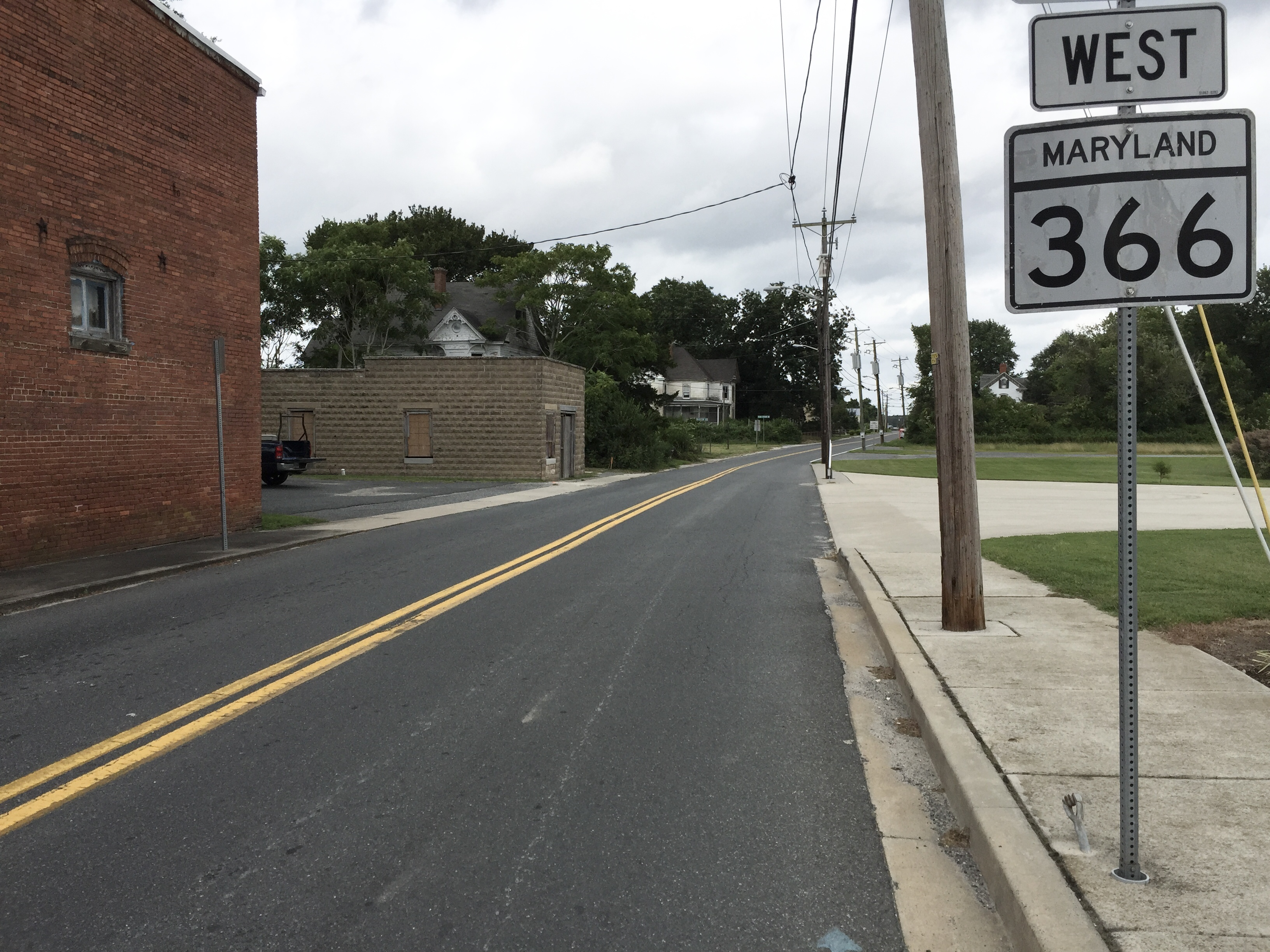
View west along MD 366 at MD 12 in Stockton

MD 366 begins at an intersection with US 13 Business (Market Street) on the southern edge of Pocomoke City. The state highway, marked as Stockton Road, turns south and then east to the intersection with US 13 (Ocean Highway). After crossing the federal highway, MD 366 heads east as a two-lane undivided road, crosses Town Branch and passes Newtown Park. The state highway leaves the town of Pocomoke City after the intersection with Groton Road and Buck Harbor Road. After passing Byrd Road and crossing Pilchard Creek, MD 366 enters the hamlet of Goodwill, where the highway intersects Lambertson Road and Holly Swamp Road. After leaving Goodwill, the state highway meets unsigned MD 703 (Klej Grange Road). MD 366 continues east through farmland, intersecting Old Mill Road before entering the unincorporated village of Stockton. Within the village, the state highway intersects MD 12 (Snow Hill Road), where the name of MD 366 changes to George Island Landing Road. After passing Greenbackville Road, the state highway goes through a straight then performs an S-curve over the marshland of E.A. Vaughn Wildlife Management Area before meeting its eastern terminus at the entrance to the parking lot of George Island Landing on Chincoteague Bay.

== History ==
The Pocomoke City–Stockton road was paved within Stockton and from Market Street east to Groton Road in Pocomoke City by 1910. Two sections of the state highway were paved from the Pocomoke City end in 1915 and 1917. By 1921, 2-mile (3.2 km) sections were built from Stockton west to Old Mill Road and east to Goodwill from the Pocomoke City End. The highway between Pocomoke City and Stockton was completed in 1923. MD 366 was under construction from the eastern end of pavement in Stockton to George Island Landing by 1934 and completed in 1935.

== Junction list ==
The entire route is in Worcester County.

Location	mi	km	Destinations	Notes
Pocomoke City	0.00	0.00	US 13 Bus. (Market Street)	Western terminus
Pocomoke City	0.20	0.32	US 13 (Ocean Highway) – Salisbury, Norfolk	
Goodwill	4.09	6.58	MD 703 west (Klej Grange Road) – Klej Grange	Eastern terminus of MD 703
Stockton	8.39	13.50	MD 12 (Snow Hill Road) – Snow Hill, Horntown, VA	
George Island Landing	11.17	17.98	Entrance to George Island Landing	Eastern terminus
1.000 mi = 1.609 km; 1.000 km = 0.621 mi
