= Naval Air Warfare Center =

Research organization in the US Navy

Naval Air Warfare Center is a research organization within Naval Air Systems Command to test and evaluate air warfare for the United States Navy. The center combines the following divisions:

== Aircraft division ==
The Naval Air Warfare Center Aircraft Division (NAWCAD) conducts research, development, test, evaluation and sustainment for all United States Navy and United States Marine Corps aircraft and aircraft systems. It operates a test wing and ranges, facilities, laboratories and aircraft in support of military operations worldwide.

NAWCAD employs military and civilian engineers, testers, scientists, and other professionals across four locations: Orlando, Florida; Lakehurst, New Jersey, St. Inigoes, Maryland, and at its headquarters in Patuxent River, Maryland. It is one of two naval air warfare centers, along with Naval Air Warfare Center Weapons Division, that provides scientific and technical support to Naval Air Systems Command (NAVAIR).

=== Naval Test Wing Atlantic ===
Naval Test Wing Atlantic is made up of four test and evaluation squadrons. Based in Patuxent River, Maryland, the wing supports test and evaluation of aviation systems ranging from unmanned to rotary and fixed-wing aircraft and subsystems. It also provides aircrew, aircraft assets, maintenance support, operational and safety oversight, process and facility support for developmental flight and ground testing.

Air Test and Evaluation Squadron Two One (HX-21) supports rotary-wing and tilt-rotor aircraft, unmanned aerial systems and airborne systems, including the V-22, UH-1Y, AH-1Z, CH-53K, MH-60R, and MH-60S.

Air Test and Evaluation Squadron Two Zero (VX-20) supports C-2A, C-12M, C-38, E-2C/D, E 6B, C/KC-130J/T, MQ-4C, P-8A, and T-6A.

Air Test and Evaluation Squadron Two Three (VX-23) supports fixed wing tactical aircraft, including the F/A-18 A/B/C/D and E/F, EA-18, T-45, and F-35B/C.

Air Test and Evaluation Squadron Two Four (UX-24) is the U.S. Navy and Marine Corps’ first dedicated test and evaluation squadron for unmanned aircraft systems, including fielded platforms like the Wasp, RQ-11 Raven, RQ-20B Puma, RQ-21 Blackjack, MQ-8 Fire Scout, and General Atomics MQ-9A Reaper.

=== U.S. Naval Test Pilot School ===
The U.S. Naval Test Pilot School trains military and civilian test pilots, flight officers and engineers in the test and evaluation of aircraft and aircraft systems. Located in Patuxent River, Maryland, it is the only U.S. source of rotary wing test pilots, and serves as the test pilot school for the U.S. Army.

USNTPS graduates two classes annually. The 11-month program includes 530 academic hours, 100 sorties and 120 flight hours. Its syllabus is divided into three parts: fixed-wing, rotary-wing and airborne systems. The school has also added test techniques for unmanned aviation systems.

Its program has graduated over 90 NASA astronauts and members of the Original Seven including Scott Carpenter, John Glenn, Wally Schirra, and Alan Shepard. It also graduated NASA’s first African-American administrator, Maj. Gen. Charles Bolden, NASA twins Scott and Mark Kelly, and Vice Adm. James Stockdale.

=== Atlantic Test Ranges ===
The Atlantic Test Ranges are instrumented test ranges providing support test and training for aircraft, aircrew and subsystems. The range features a telemetry center for real-time data transmission from up to nine separate in-flight aircraft to ground engineering personnel. The center manages over 2,700 square miles of restricted airspace including targets and airspace over the mid-Atlantic seaboard.

== Weapons division ==
- NAWCWD China Lake
- NAWCWD Point Mugu

== See also ==
- Naval Information Warfare Center Pacific
- Naval Surface Warfare Center
- List of aerospace flight test centres
