= Mansion House (Public Landing, Maryland) =

Historic house in Maryland, United States

- U.S. National Register of Historic Places
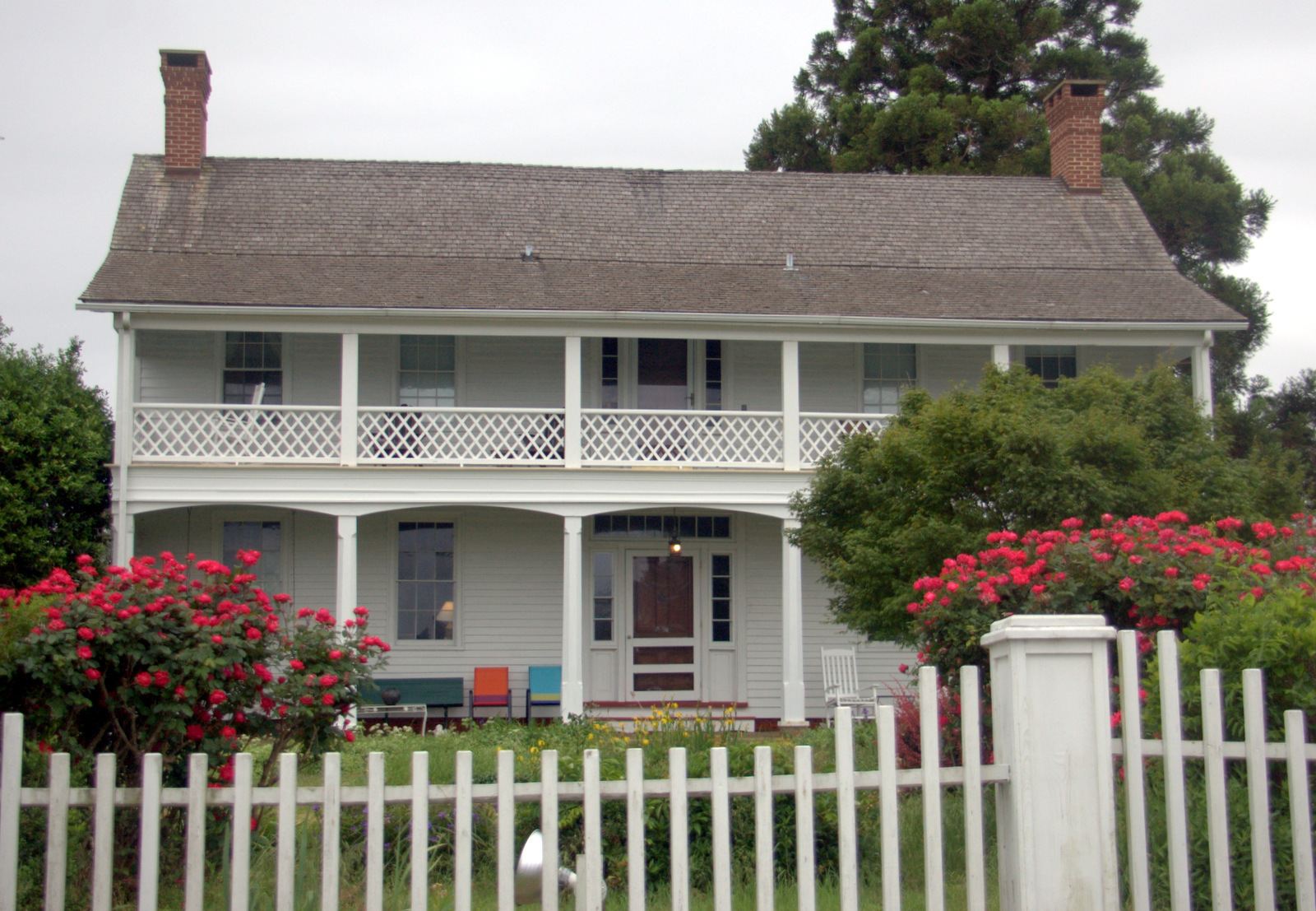

- Location within Maryland Location within the United States
- Location: Bayside Rd. Public Landing, Maryland
- Coordinates: 38°8′54″N 75°17′15″W
- Area: 1 acre (0.40 ha)
- Built: 1835
- Architectural style: Greek Revival, Federal
- NRHP reference No.: 94001643
- Added to NRHP: January 19, 1995

Mansion House, located near Public Landing, Maryland, United States, is an early-to-mid-19th century plantation house built as the main residence of a forced-labor farm of more than 250 acres. This "telescoping house" was built in five main parts beginning about 1835. The distinct blocks were designed in a manner that separated the main house from the enslaved servants' quarters while keeping them close at hand.

Mansion House was listed on the National Register of Historic Places in 1995.
