= Sinepuxent Bay Wildlife Management Area =

Wildlife Management Area in Maryland, US

Coordinates: 38°14′16.5″N 75°9′17.6″W

- Interactive map of Sinepuxent Bay Wildlife Management Area
- Location: Worcester County, Maryland, United States
- Nearest city: Ocean City, Maryland
- Area: 25 acres (100,000 m^{2})
- Governing body: Maryland Department of Natural Resources

Sinepuxent Bay Wildlife Management Area is a state wildlife management area (WMA) of Maryland that consists of several islands in Sinepuxent Bay, Isle of Wight Bay, and Chincoteague Bay in Worcester County.

In the 1930s, dredge spoils from the Chesapeake Bay were used to create 29 islands from Coffin's Point to Tingle's Island. Because of erosion, only four of the thirteen islands designated for wildlife protection in 1964 remain. Heron and Skimmer Islands, located north of the U.S. Route 50 bridge, were added to the Sinepuxent Bay WMA in 1993. These islands, totaling 25 acres (100,000 m^{2}), are a mixture of marsh and tidal mud flats.

Sinepuxent Bay WMA serves as breeding habitat for birds, which nest together in large colonies. Royal terns and black skimmers are among the "colonial nesting" shorebirds on the islands. Ducks and herons nest on islands with grasses or small trees. Since 1987, one of these islands has been home for a colony of nesting brown pelicans. In the fall, hunters will find ducks, snow geese, Atlantic brant and Canada geese. Fishing is excellent for flounder, sea trout, croaker, spot, and bluefish.

The islands can be reached only by boat. Hunting in season is permitted in the WMA, as are birding and boating.
