= Public Landing, Maryland =

Unincorporated community in Maryland, United States

- Unincorporated community
- Location within Maryland
- Coordinates: 38°08′56″N 75°17′15″W
- Country: United States
- State: Maryland
- County: Worcester
- Elevation: 10 ft (3.0 m)
- Time zone: UTC-5 (Eastern (EST))
  - Summer (DST): UTC-4 (EDT)
- ZIP code: 21863
- Area codes: 410, 443, and 667
- GNIS feature ID: 586719

Public Landing is an unincorporated community 6.5 miles (10 km) east of Snow Hill in Worcester County, Maryland, United States. Public Landing is located on Chincoteague Bay, at the end of Maryland Route 365.

Public Landing enjoyed great popularity during the 1920s and early 1930s, when rides, a bowling alley, and other amusements were open, and the shallowness of Chincoteague Bay permitted public bathing. However, a large hurricane in 1933 destroyed Public Landing's waterfront. Although a pier was rebuilt, and public bathing continued, Public Landing's heyday as a waterfront destination was overtaken by Ocean City.

Mansion House was listed on the National Register of Historic Places in 1995.
