= Goodwill, Maryland =

Unincorporated community in Maryland, United States

- Unincorporated community
- Location within Maryland
- Coordinates: 38°04′14″N 75°29′30″W
- Country: United States
- State: Maryland
- County: Worcester
- Elevation: 30 ft (9.1 m)
- Time zone: UTC-5 (Eastern (EST))
  - Summer (DST): UTC-4 (EDT)
- ZIP code: 21851
- Area codes: 410, 443, and 667
- GNIS feature ID: 588665

Goodwill is an unincorporated community five miles (8 km) east of Pocomoke City in Worcester County, Maryland, United States, located at 38°4′14″N 75°29′30″W.

Originally called Davis Crossroads, or simply Crossroads, Goodwill grew at the crossing of the roads leading from Mattapony Landing on the Pocomoke River down into Virginia, and from Stevens Landing (now Pocomoke City) to Sandy Hill (later Stockton). The latter road is now Maryland Route 366.

Sometime in the late 19th or early 20th century, Davis Crossroads began to be referred to by the name of the Methodist church there, the Goodwill Methodist Church, and the name stuck. Among Goodwill's small number of houses are two that are converted one-room schoolhouses.
