= Sinepuxent Bay =

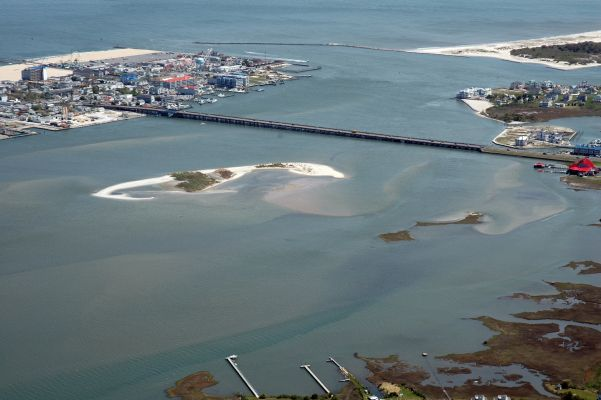
- The Sinepuxent Bay crossed by the Harry W. Kelley Memorial Bridge, looking south. The southern end of Ocean City, the Ocean City Inlet, the northern tip of Assateague Island, the south inlet jetty, and the Atlantic Ocean are at the top of the image. Skimmer Island is in the left-center and Horn Island is in the right center of the picture, in front of the bridge.

- Location within Maryland
- Location: Worcester County, Maryland
- Coordinates: 38°15′00″N 75°08′39″W
- Type: Bay
- Surface elevation: 0 feet (0 m)

Sinepuxent Bay is an inland waterway which connects Chincoteague Bay to Isle of Wight Bay, and is connected to the Atlantic Ocean via the Ocean City Inlet. It separates Sinepuxent Neck, in Worcester County, Maryland from Assateague Island, and West Ocean City, Maryland from downtown Ocean City. Islands in the Sinepuxent Bay include Horn Island and Skimmer Island. It is crossed by the Harry W. Kelley Memorial Bridge on U.S. Route 50 and the Verrazano Bridge on Maryland Route 611 (not to be confused with the Verrazzano–Narrows Bridge in New York City; both were named for Giovanni da Verrazzano, who explored the coastline in 1524). The bay is the location of the islands that compose the Sinepuxent Bay Wildlife Management Area. Historically the area was referred to by various names including Sinepuxent, Sene Puxon, Synepuxent, Cinnepuxon, et al.

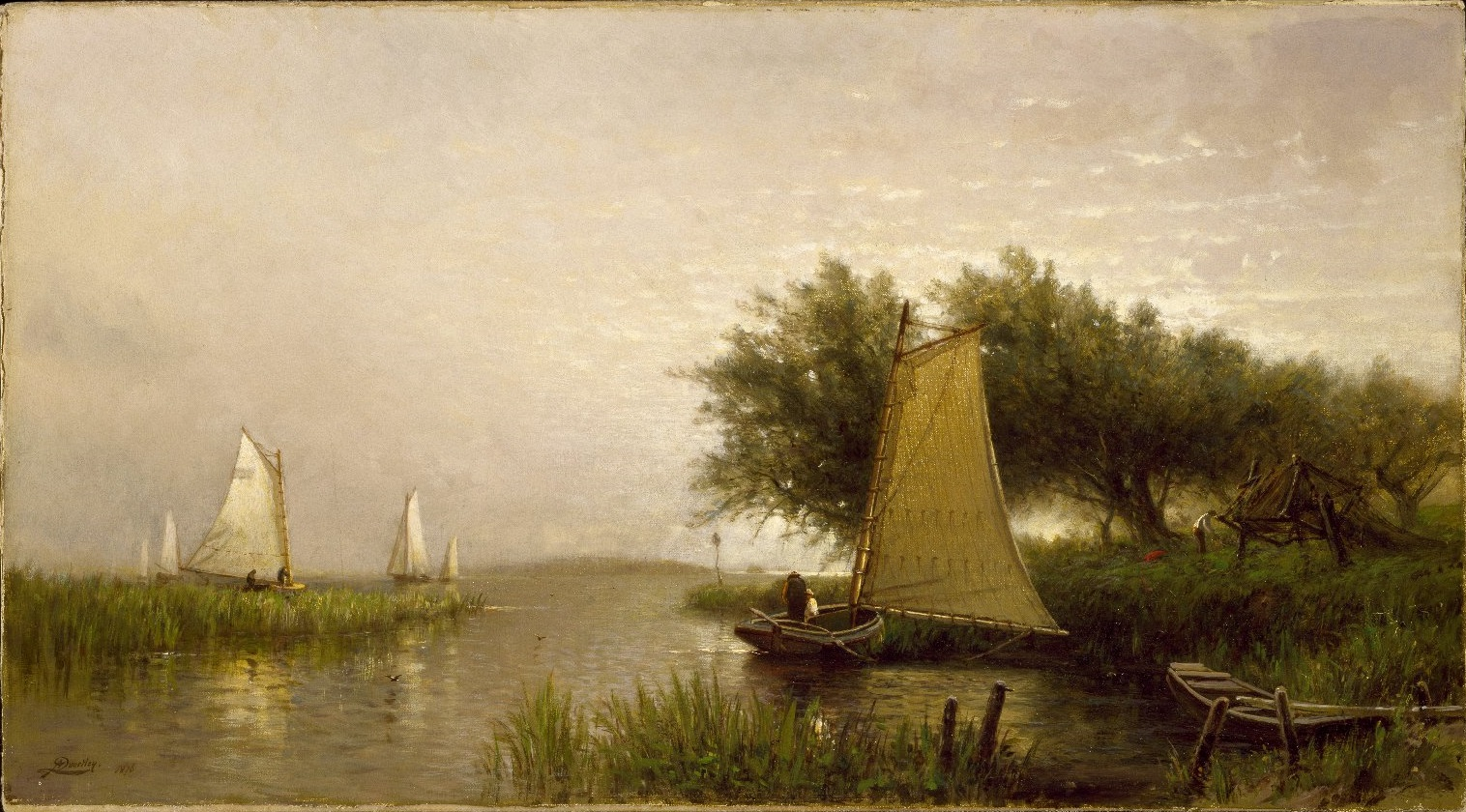
Arthur Quartley, On Synepuxent Bay, Maryland 1876. Brooklyn Museum

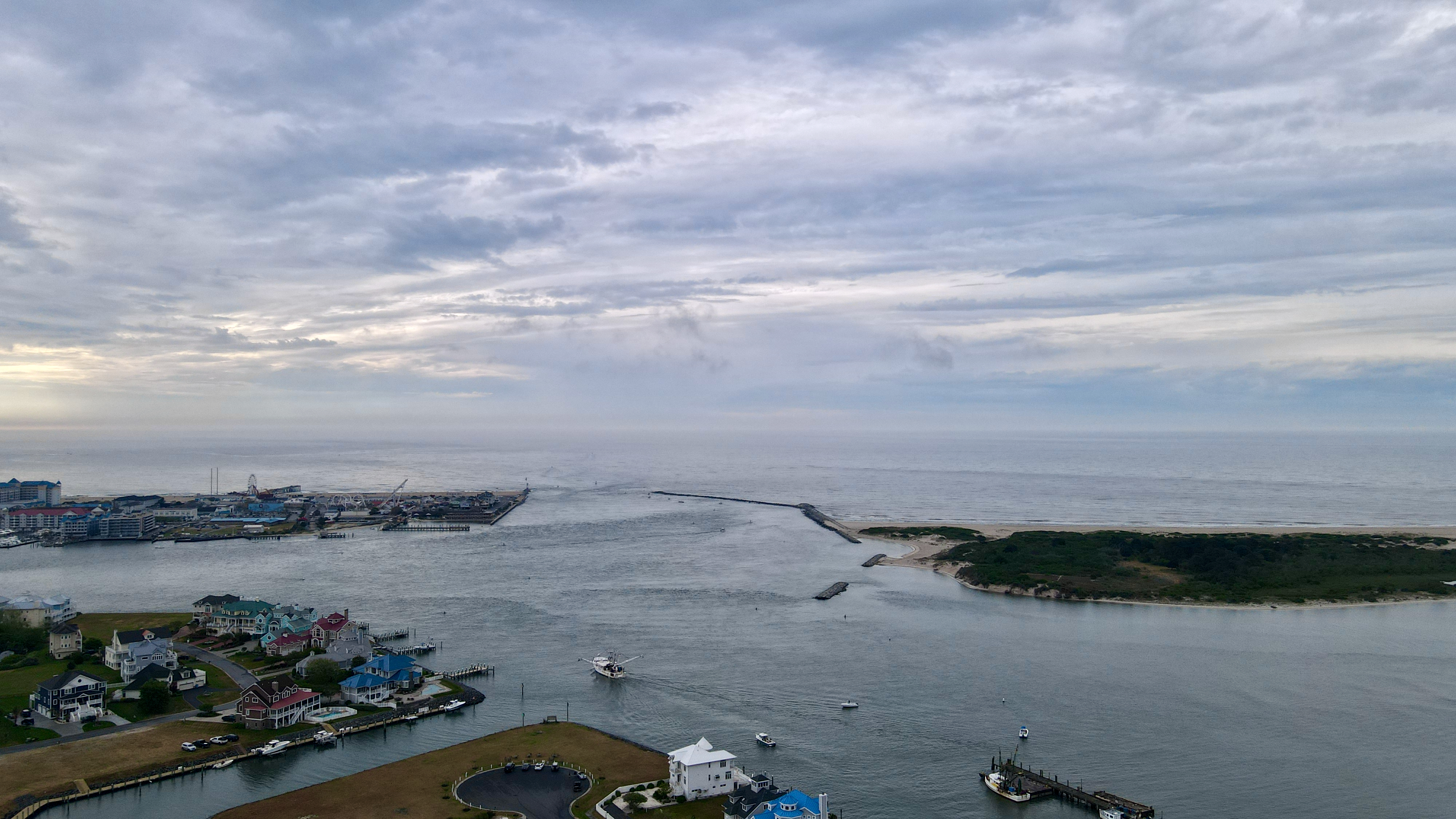
Ocean City Maryland Inlet

Sinepuxent Inlet, a navigable waterway through the barrier island during the colonial era, was located just south of the Assateague Island National Seashore day-use area. In September 1698 French pirate Canoot seized a Philadelphia-based sloop "as he was coming out of Cinnepuxon Inlet." The Inlet was closed in a hurricane in 1818, and was filled in by sand in 1860. Sinepuxent was a once-thriving community on the mainland about a half mile north of the Verrazano Bridge, also destroyed in the same hurricane.

The current inlet, known as Ocean City Inlet, was cut by the great 1933 Chesapeake–Potomac hurricane, also known as Hurricane Six of 1933. The new inlet was stabilized by rock jetties constructed by the United States Army Corps of Engineers, with work commencing in October 1933. Because of the changes that the creation of the Ocean City Inlet made to tidal flows in the bays, the United States Army Corps of Engineers now internally defines the Isle of Wight Bay as extending south to the inlet, and Sinepuxent Bay extending south from the inlet to Chincoteague Bay, despite historical naming conventions.
