= Maryland Route 12 =

State highway in Worcester and Wicomico Counties, Maryland, US

Maryland Route 12

Route information
- Maintained by MDSHA and City of Salisbury
- Length: 30.57 mi (49.20 km)
- Existed: 1927–present
- Tourist routes: Cape to Cape Scenic Byway

Major junctions
- South end: SR 679 at Virginia border south of Stockton
- MD 366 in Stockton; US 113 in Snow Hill; US 113 Bus. in Snow Hill; MD 354 in Indiantown; US 13 near Salisbury
- North end: Main Street in Salisbury

Location
- Country: United States
- State: Maryland
- Counties: Worcester, Wicomico

Highway system
- Maryland highway system; Interstate; US; State; Scenic Byways
← US 11	→ US 13

Maryland Route 12 (MD 12) is a state highway on the Eastern Shore in the U.S. state of Maryland. The route runs 30.57 mi (49.20 km) from the Virginia border south of Stockton, Worcester County, where it continues into Virginia as State Route 679 (SR 679), north to Main Street in the city of Salisbury in Wicomico County. The route is known as Snow Hill Road for most of its length and passes mostly through areas of woods and farms as well as the communities of Stockton, Girdletree, and Snow Hill. MD 12 intersects several roads including MD 366 in Stockton, U.S. Route 113 (US 113) and US 113 Business (US 113 Bus.) in Snow Hill, MD 354 in Indiantown, and US 13 near Salisbury. Portions of MD 12 near Snow Hill and Stockton existed as unnumbered state roads by 1910. When the first state highways in Maryland were designated by 1927, MD 12 was assigned to run from Stockton north to Salisbury. By 1940, the route was extended south to the Virginia border and a small incomplete portion between Snow Hill and Salisbury was finished. A dumbbell interchange is planned at the US 113 intersection; however, this project is currently on hold.

== Route description ==
MD 12 heads north from the Virginia border on Snow Hill Road, which is a two-lane undivided road. The road continues south into Virginia as SR 679 (Fleming Road). From the border, the route passes through a mix of woodland and farmland with a few residences in southern Worcester County before reaching Stockton. Here, MD 12 passes by homes and crosses MD 366 (Stockton Road/George Island Landing Road). Upon leaving Stockton, the roads heads back into rural areas and passes near the E.A. Vaughn Wildlife Management Area before reaching the residential community of Girdletree. Past Girdletree, the road continues to the east of a tract of the Pocomoke State Forest as it approaches the town of Snow Hill, the county seat of Worcester County. Just south of Snow Hill, the route intersects US 113 (Worcester Highway).

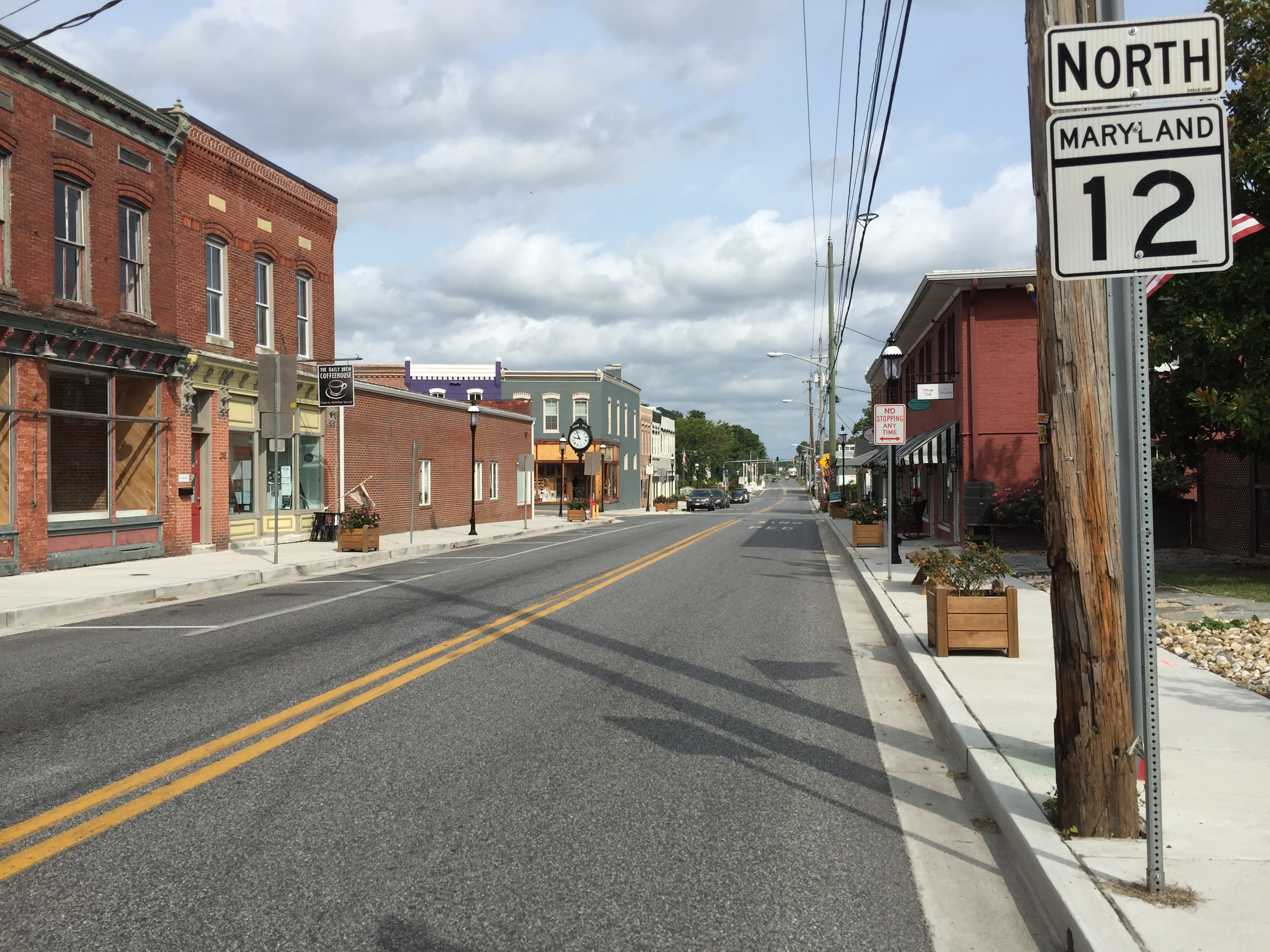
View north along MD 12 at US 113 Bus. in Snow Hill

Past this intersection, the road enters Snow Hill, where it becomes Church Street, and heads into inhabited areas with some businesses, passing west of Snow Hill High School. In the center of town, MD 12 intersects US 113 Bus. (Market Street) and turns east to form a concurrency with that route, passing through the downtown area. Within the downtown, the road passes by the Julia A. Purnell Museum and the Worcester County Courthouse. Here, MD 12 turns north to follow Washington Street, crossing the Pocomoke River out of downtown Snow Hill on a drawbridge. From here, the route becomes Snow Hill Road again and turns northwest. The road heads into agricultural areas with some residences before Indiantown, where MD 12 intersects the southern terminus of MD 354 (Whiton Road), which runs north to Willards. Past this intersection, the route turns more to the west and heads through a mix of farmland and woodland with occasional homes. The road turns to the northwest again and runs to the northeast of more tracts of the Pocomoke State Forest. The Pocomoke State Forest is known for its loblolly trees and cypress swamps and is popular with fishing and hunting.

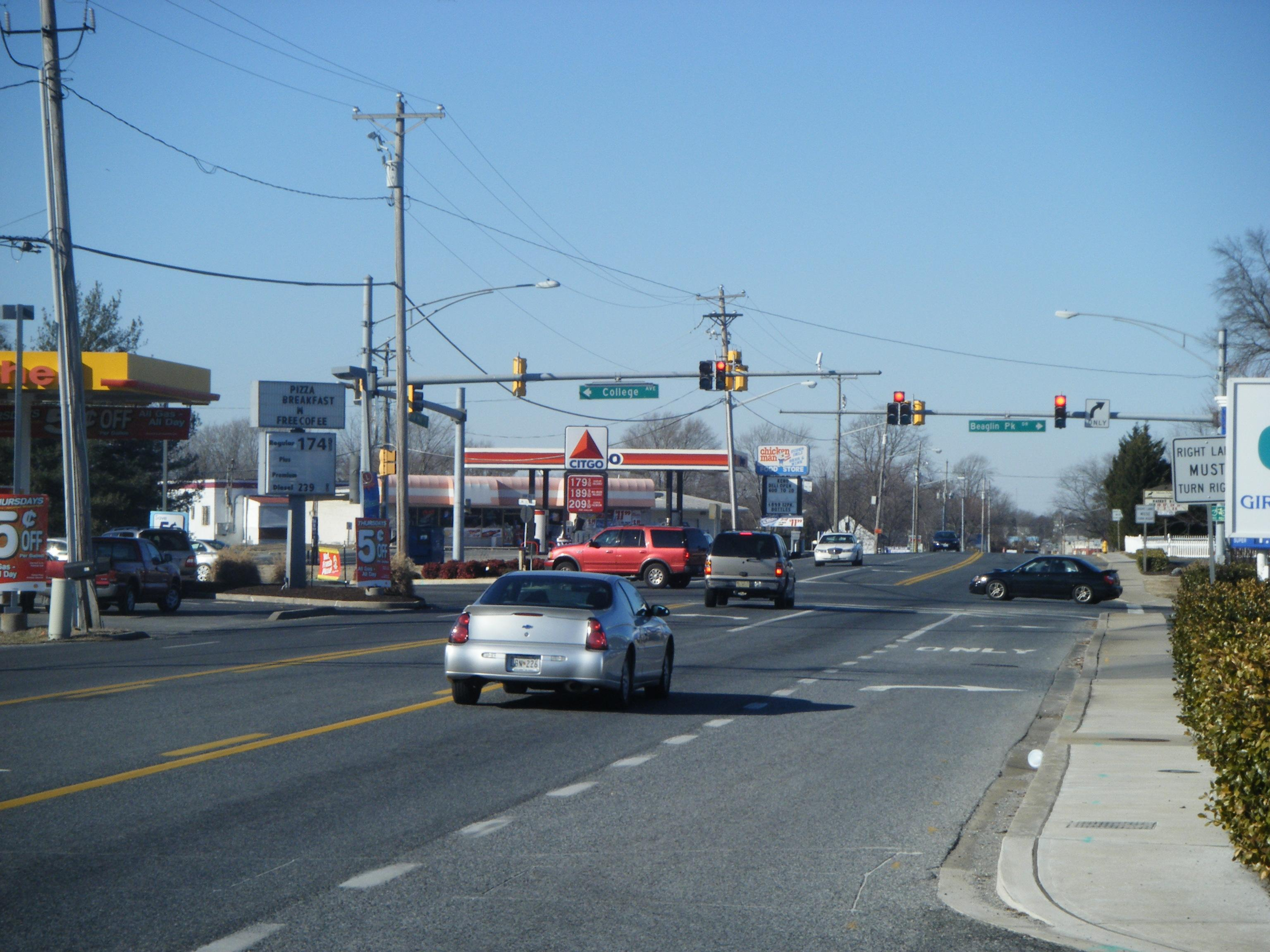
MD 12 northbound at intersection with College Avenue/Beaglin Park Drive in Salisbury

MD 12 crosses into Wicomico County, where it continues north through woods and farms with some residences. The route turns northwest again before heading into a mix of residential areas and farm fields on the outskirts of the city of Salisbury. The road comes to a partial cloverleaf interchange with US 13 (Salisbury Bypass), where the route briefly becomes a four-lane divided highway. Past US 13, MD 12 crosses into Salisbury at the Johnson Road intersection. Here, the route heads north through commercial areas, becoming a six-lane road with a center left-turn lane, two southbound travel lanes and one northbound travel lane. In addition, there is one lane in each direction devoted to right turns. At the intersection with College Avenue/Beaglin Park Drive, the road narrows to four lanes with each direction consisting of one travel lane and a right-turn lane. This configuration eventually ends and MD 12 becomes a two-lane road again, leaving the corporate limits of Salisbury. Upon entering Salisbury again, the route becomes municipally maintained and continues past a mix of residences and businesses with some industrial establishments. MD 12 crosses over a branch of the Wicomico River west of the Salisbury City Park, which contains the Salisbury Zoo, before ending at Main Street a short distance to the east of US 13 Bus. (Salisbury Boulevard) near downtown Salisbury.

MD 12 is a part of the National Highway System as a principal arterial from Nutters Cross Road south of US 13 near Salisbury north to Main Street in Salisbury.

== History ==
The portion of MD 12 south of Snow Hill was part of an old post road from the 18th century that ran the length of the Delmarva Peninsula. The section of the state highway north of Snow Hill is the descendant of the Old Snow Hill Road from Salisbury whose original bridge across the Pocomoke River dates to 1878. The Maryland State Roads Commission designated the highway from Stockton to Snow Hill as one of the original state roads in 1909. By 1910, the highway was paved within Stockton, between Snow Hill and Indiantown, and for about 2 miles (3.2 km) south from the city limit of Salisbury. The highway was paved from Snow Hill to a point north of Girdletree by 1917. The all-weather road between Snow Hill and Stockton was completed by 1921. The Snow Hill–Salisbury road was under construction by 1923. By 1927, MD 12 had been assigned to the highway despite a 4-mile (6.4 km) gap remaining from just north of the Wicomico–Worcester county line south toward Snow Hill. That gap was filled by 1930. In addition, MD 12's present northern terminus at Main Street, including the bridge across the South Prong of the Wicomico River, was constructed in 1928 and 1929. The highway had previously entered Salisbury along Lincoln Avenue and Division Street. The final portion of MD 12 was completed between Stockton and the Virginia state line by 1933. In addition, the present bridge across the Pocomoke River was completed in 1932. MD 12 was widened and straightened from Stockton to Salisbury between 1951 and 1954.

== Future ==
An interchange is planned between MD 12 and US 113 south of Snow Hill in order to improve safety and traffic flow as a follow-up to widening US 113; however, the project is currently on hold. This proposed interchange is to be a dumbbell interchange, a variation of the diamond interchange with two roundabouts on MD 12 where it intersects the ramps to US 113. The proposed cost needed to build this interchange is $24.2 million, which includes engineering, acquisition of land, and the actual construction.

== Junction list ==
County	Location	mi	km	Destinations	Notes
Worcester		0.00	0.00	SR 679 (Fleming Road/State Line Road) – Greenbackville	Virginia state line; southern terminus
Worcester	Stockton	3.31	5.33	MD 366 (Stockton Road/George Island Landing Road) – George Island Landing, Pocomoke	
Worcester	Snow Hill	11.04	17.77	US 113 (Worcester Highway) – Pocomoke, Berlin	
Worcester	Snow Hill	12.55	20.20	US 113 Bus. south (Market Street) – Pocomoke	South end of US 113 Bus. overlap
Worcester	Snow Hill	12.73	20.49	US 113 Bus. north (Market Street) – Berlin	North end of US 113 Bus. overlap
Worcester	Snow Hill	13.95	22.45	MD 354 north (Whiton Road) – Willards	Southern terminus of MD 354
Wicomico	Salisbury	27.99	45.05	US 13 (Salisbury Bypass) – Norfolk, Dover	Interchange
Wicomico	Salisbury	30.57	49.20	Main Street to US 50	Northern terminus
1.000 mi = 1.609 km; 1.000 km = 0.621 mi: Concurrency terminus

== Auxiliary route ==
- MD 12A runs along an unnamed road from MD 12 east to a dead end in Girdletree, Worcester County. The route is 0.02 mi (0.032 km) long.
