= Harry W. Kelley Memorial Bridge =

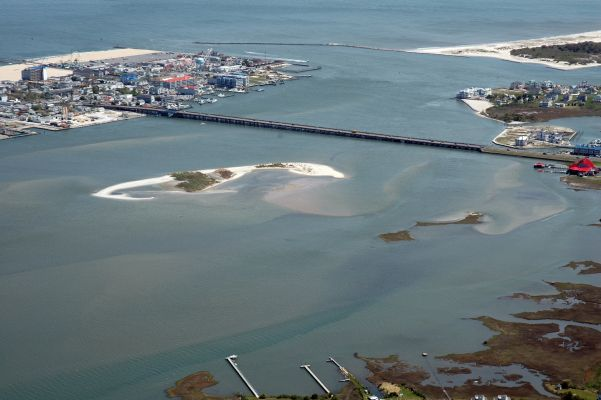
- The Sinepuxent Bay traversed by the bridge; the mainland is at bottom right, Ocean City at top left.
- Coordinates: 38°19′59″N 75°05′35″W
- Carries: Four lanes of US 50, pedestrians and bicycles along both directions
- Crosses: Sinepuxent Bay
- Locale: Ocean City, Maryland
- Maintained by: Maryland State Highway Administration
- ID number: #23007

Characteristics
- Design: Bascule bridge

History
- Construction start: Autumn 1941
- Opened: November 16, 1942

Statistics
- Daily traffic: 21,491

Location
- Interactive map of Harry W. Kelley Memorial Bridge

The Harry W. Kelley Memorial Bridge is a bridge in the U.S. state of Maryland. It carries 4 lanes of U.S. Route 50, plus two sidewalks, across Sinepuxent Bay, connecting the downtown area of Ocean City, Maryland to the mainland of Worcester County, Maryland within West Ocean City, and is mere feet from the national eastern terminus of said route. It is one of four entrances to the resort town, and the southernmost of them all; the others are Maryland Route 90, Delaware Route 54, and Delaware Route 1. The bridge features a drawbridge span near the Ocean City end. The bridge is named for Harry W. Kelley, a former mayor of Ocean City.

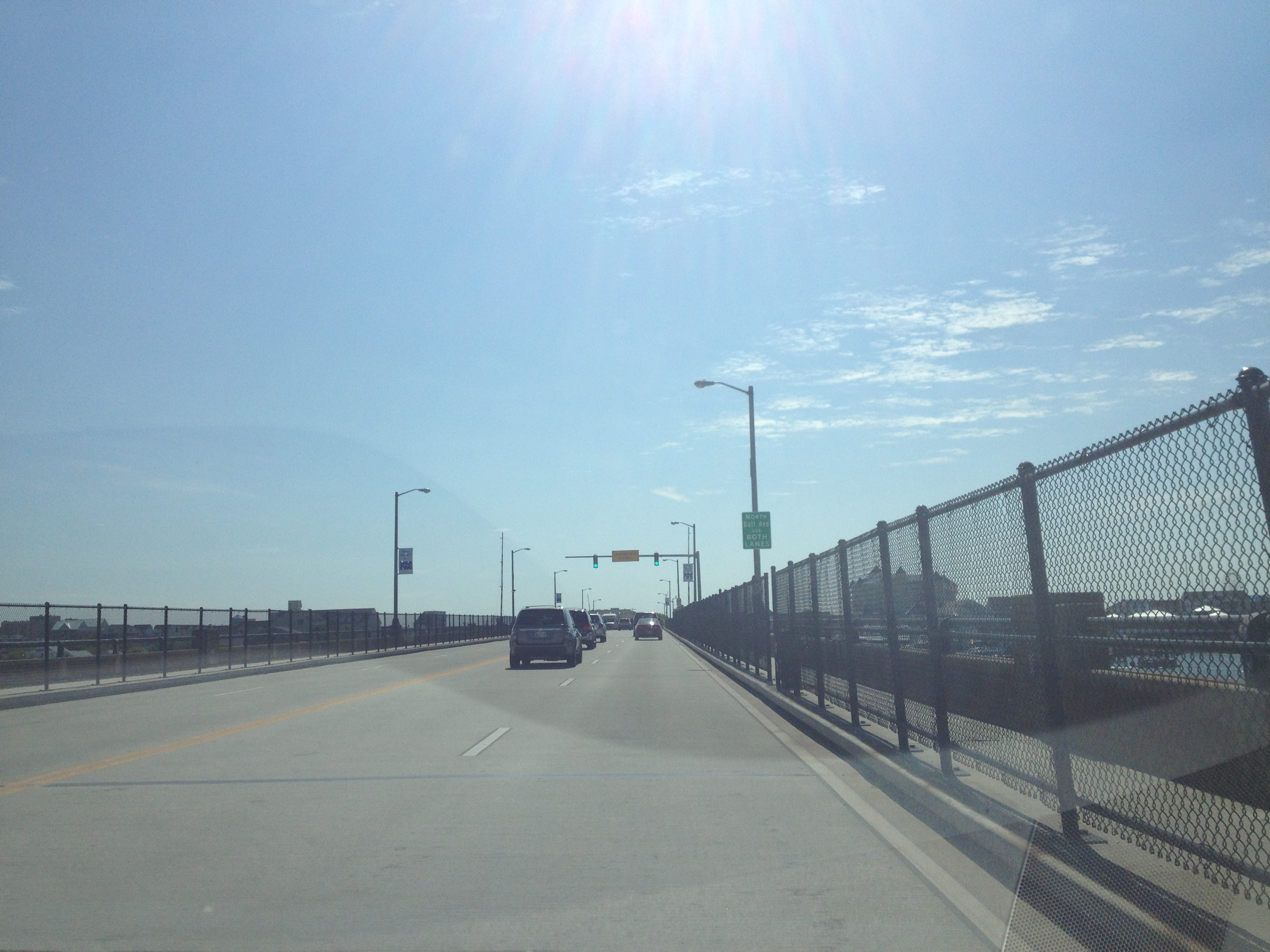
Eastbound across the bridge

The current bridge in this location, built in 1942, replaces an earlier bridge that was slightly downstream of the current site, which used what is now Maryland Route 707 (Old Bridge Road) to cross the Sinepuxent Bay and connect to downtown Ocean City as Worcester Street. At the time of its construction, the bridge carried U.S. Route 213; it was changed to its current number in 1948 when the extension of US 50 replaced US 213 south of Queen Anne's County. Currently the bridge is a busy center of activity in the city, and is utilized by many fishermen, joggers, and cyclists. The bridge is the target of much discussion due to its age and structural issues, as well as its antiquated design.

In August 2010, the Maryland State Highway Administration decided to construct a new drawbridge to replace the current structure. The new drawbridge was selected over a higher fixed span, which would have cost more and have displaced more properties. The bridge is not expected to be constructed until at least 2035, with $300 million in funding for planning of the bridge. When the new bridge is complete, the existing structure is planned to be turned into a fishing pier with the central part of the bridge removed.
