= West Ocean City, Maryland =

- CDP
- Location of West Ocean City, Maryland

- Location within the state of Maryland West Ocean City (the United States)
- Coordinates: 38°20′6″N 75°6′45″W
- Country: United States
- State: Maryland
- County: Worcester

Area
  - Total: 7.04 sq mi (18.24 km^{2})
  - Land: 4.19 sq mi (10.85 km^{2})
  - Water: 2.85 sq mi (7.39 km^{2})
- Elevation: 6.6 ft (2 m)

Population (2020)
  - Total: 4,952
  - Density: 1,182.0/sq mi (456.37/km^{2})
- Time zone: UTC−5 (Eastern (EST))
  - Summer (DST): UTC−4 (EDT)
- ZIP code: 21842
- Area codes: 410, 443
- FIPS code: 24-83225
- GNIS feature ID: 0591524

West Ocean City is a census-designated place (CDP) in Worcester County, Maryland, United States. The population was 4,375 at the 2010 census. It is part of the Salisbury, Maryland-Delaware Metropolitan Statistical Area.

== Geography ==
West Ocean City is located at 38°20′6″N 75°6′45″W (38.335010, −75.112474). It is located across the Sinepuxent Bay from Ocean City.

According to the United States Census Bureau, the CDP has a total area of 6.6 square miles (17 km^{2}), of which 4.0 square miles (10 km^{2}) is land and 2.6 square miles (6.7 km^{2}) (39.22%) is water.

=== Climate ===
The climate in this area is characterized by hot, humid summers and generally mild to cool winters. According to the Köppen Climate Classification system, West Ocean City has a humid subtropical climate, abbreviated "Cfa" on climate maps.

== Demographics ==
Historical population
Census	Pop.	Note	%±
2000	3,311		—
2010	4,375		32.1%
2020	4,952		13.2%
U.S. Decennial Census

=== 2020 census ===
As of the 2020 census, West Ocean City had a population of 4,952. The median age was 49.8 years. 16.3% of residents were under the age of 18 and 23.8% of residents were 65 years of age or older. For every 100 females there were 94.7 males, and for every 100 females age 18 and over there were 94.1 males age 18 and over.

99.7% of residents lived in urban areas, while 0.3% lived in rural areas.

There were 2,164 households in West Ocean City, of which 21.0% had children under the age of 18 living in them. Of all households, 46.6% were married-couple households, 19.2% were households with a male householder and no spouse or partner present, and 25.9% were households with a female householder and no spouse or partner present. About 29.9% of all households were made up of individuals and 13.8% had someone living alone who was 65 years of age or older.

There were 3,236 housing units, of which 33.1% were vacant. The homeowner vacancy rate was 2.1% and the rental vacancy rate was 8.4%.

Racial composition as of the 2020 census
Race	Number	Percent
White	4,480	90.5%
Black or African American	101	2.0%
American Indian and Alaska Native	13	0.3%
Asian	60	1.2%
Native Hawaiian and Other Pacific Islander	1	0.0%
Some other race	56	1.1%
Two or more races	241	4.9%
Hispanic or Latino (of any race)	166	3.4%

=== 2000 census ===
As of the census of 2000, there were 3,311 people, 1,425 households, and 967 families residing in the CDP. The population density was 822.4 inhabitants per square mile (317.5/km^{2}). There were 2,075 housing units at an average density of 515.4 per square mile (199.0/km^{2}). The racial makeup of the CDP was 96.04% White, 1.60% African American, 0.42% Native American, 0.66% Asian, 0.03% Pacific Islander, 0.06% from other races, and 1.18% from two or more races. Hispanic or Latino of any race were 1.42% of the population.

There were 1,425 households, out of which 23.7% had children under the age of 18 living with them, 57.1% were married couples living together, 8.4% had a female householder with no husband present, and 32.1% were non-families. 25.1% of all households were made up of individuals, and 8.6% had someone living alone who was 65 years of age or older. The average household size was 2.32 and the average family size was 2.77.

In the CDP, the population was spread out, with 19.8% under the age of 18, 5.0% from 18 to 24, 27.9% from 25 to 44, 28.3% from 45 to 64, and 19.1% who were 65 years of age or older. The median age was 44 years. For every 100 females, there were 97.2 males. For every 100 females age 18 and over, there were 95.0 males.

The median income for a household in the CDP was $42,279, and the median income for a family was $51,111. Males had a median income of $30,444 versus $27,222 for females. The per capita income for the CDP was $28,132. About 3.0% of families and 5.0% of the population were below the poverty line, including 4.1% of those under age 18 and 3.1% of those age 65 or over.

== Tourism ==
West Ocean City is located along U.S. Route 50 across the Harry W. Kelley Memorial Bridge over the Sinepuxent Bay from the beach resort town of Ocean City. The area is home to fishing charters, boating, marinas, and the Outlets Ocean City.
