= HX-21 =

- Active: 1949 – present
- Country: United States
- Branch: United States Navy
- Type: Squadron
- Role: Air Test and Evaluation
- Size: ca. 40 Officers, 50 Enlisted personnel from Navy, Marine Corps, Coast Guard and over 400 civil servants and contractors
- Garrison/HQ: Naval Air Station Patuxent River
- Nickname: Blackjack

Air Test and Evaluation Squadron TWO ONE (HX-21) "Blackjack" is a U.S. Navy aircraft squadron located at Naval Air Station Patuxent River, Maryland on the Chesapeake Bay. As part of the Naval Air Warfare Center Aircraft Division (NAWC-AD), Naval Test Wing Atlantic (NTWL), HX-21 is responsible for the Developmental Test and Evaluation of Navy and Marine Corps rotary-wing/tilt-rotor aircraft, and airborne systems in support of acquisition decisions that improve the Navy and Marine Corps' war fighting capability. Additionally, HX-21 tests and evaluates new mission systems to integrate legacy aircraft into the constantly evolving fighting force.

== History of TWO ONE ==
On 1 April 1949, the United States Navy formally established a rotary wing flight test section under Flight Test Order No. 2-49 whereby all tests and trials of rotary wing aircraft and associated equipment would be conducted under a rotary wing section of the Naval Air Test Center's flight test division. This rotary wing section was responsible for the scheduling of tests and development of criteria for reporting the test results for rotary wing aircraft types. This designation was maintained until 4 April 1975 when rotary test and evaluation was established as its own separate aircraft test directorate known as the "Rotary Wing Aircraft Test Directorate" (RWATD). RWATD was then redesignated into the Rotary Wing [aircraft] Test Squadron (RWaTS) on 21 July 1995. RWaTS finally became Air Test and Evaluation Squadron TWO ONE on 1 May 2002 to better align with fleet squadron naming conventions.

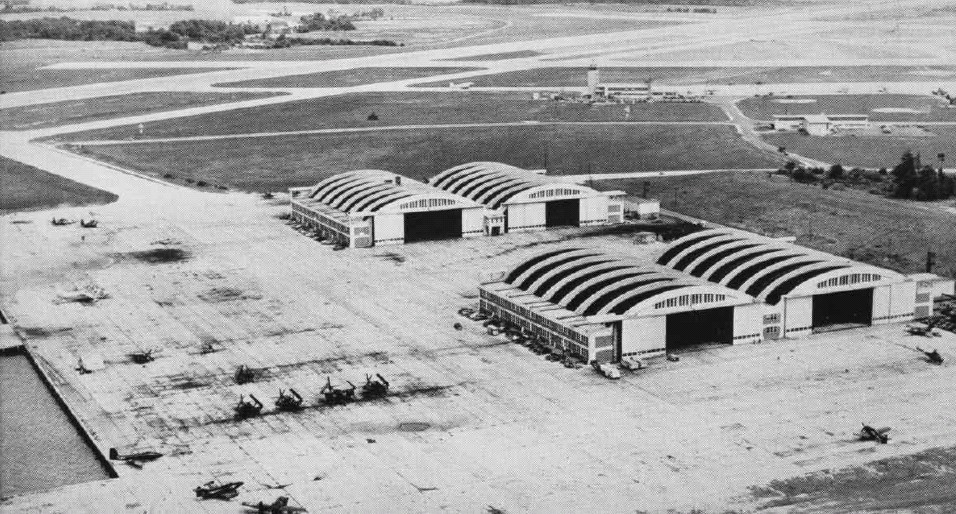
Hangar Bay c. 1950

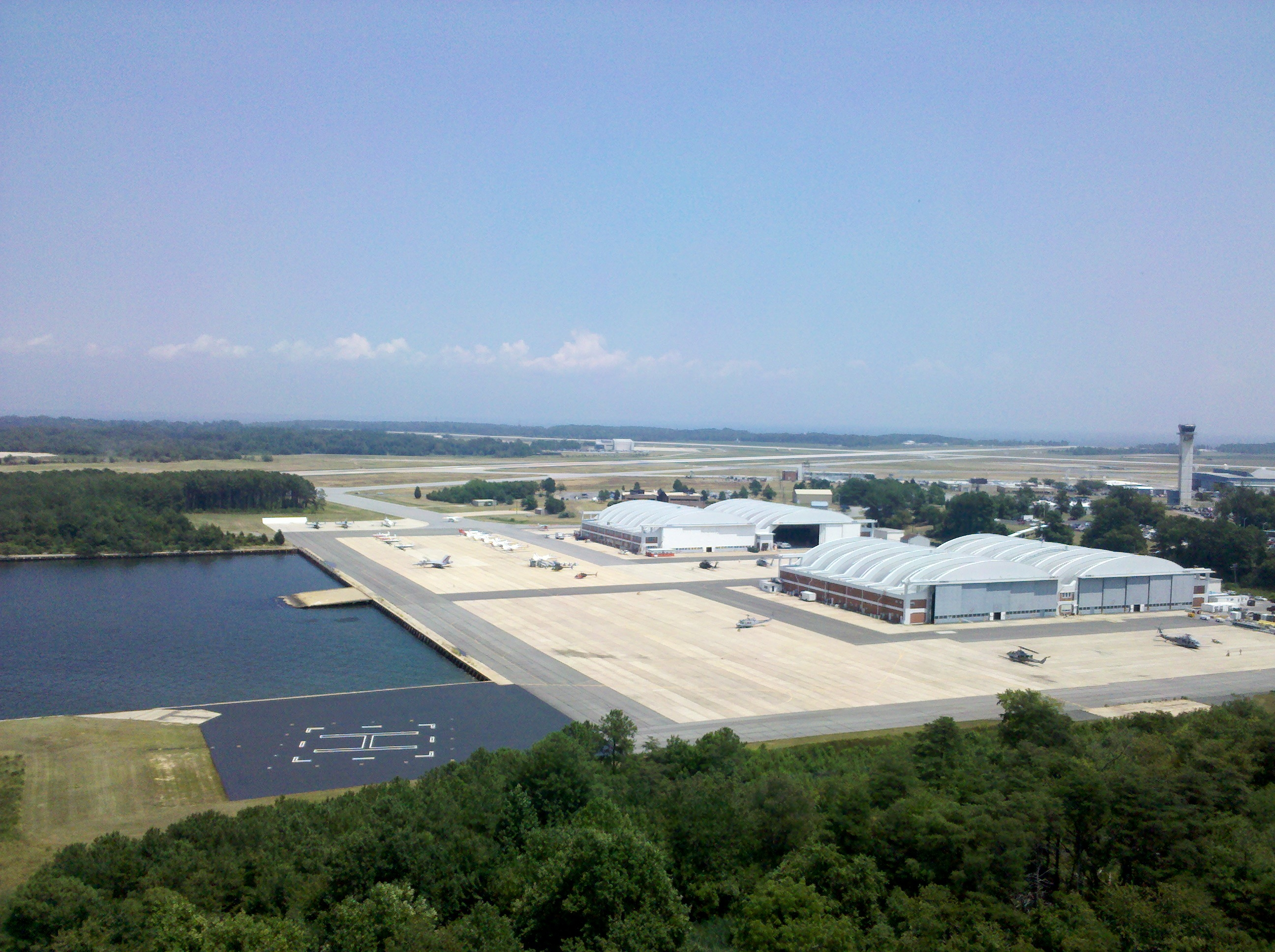
Hangar Bay 2010

NAS Patuxent River

== History of the Patch ==
Legend has it the original Rotary Wing Aircraft Test Directorate patch (right) was designed on the kitchen table of the first Technical Director, Richard "Dick" Wernecke, and has remained in place to this day.

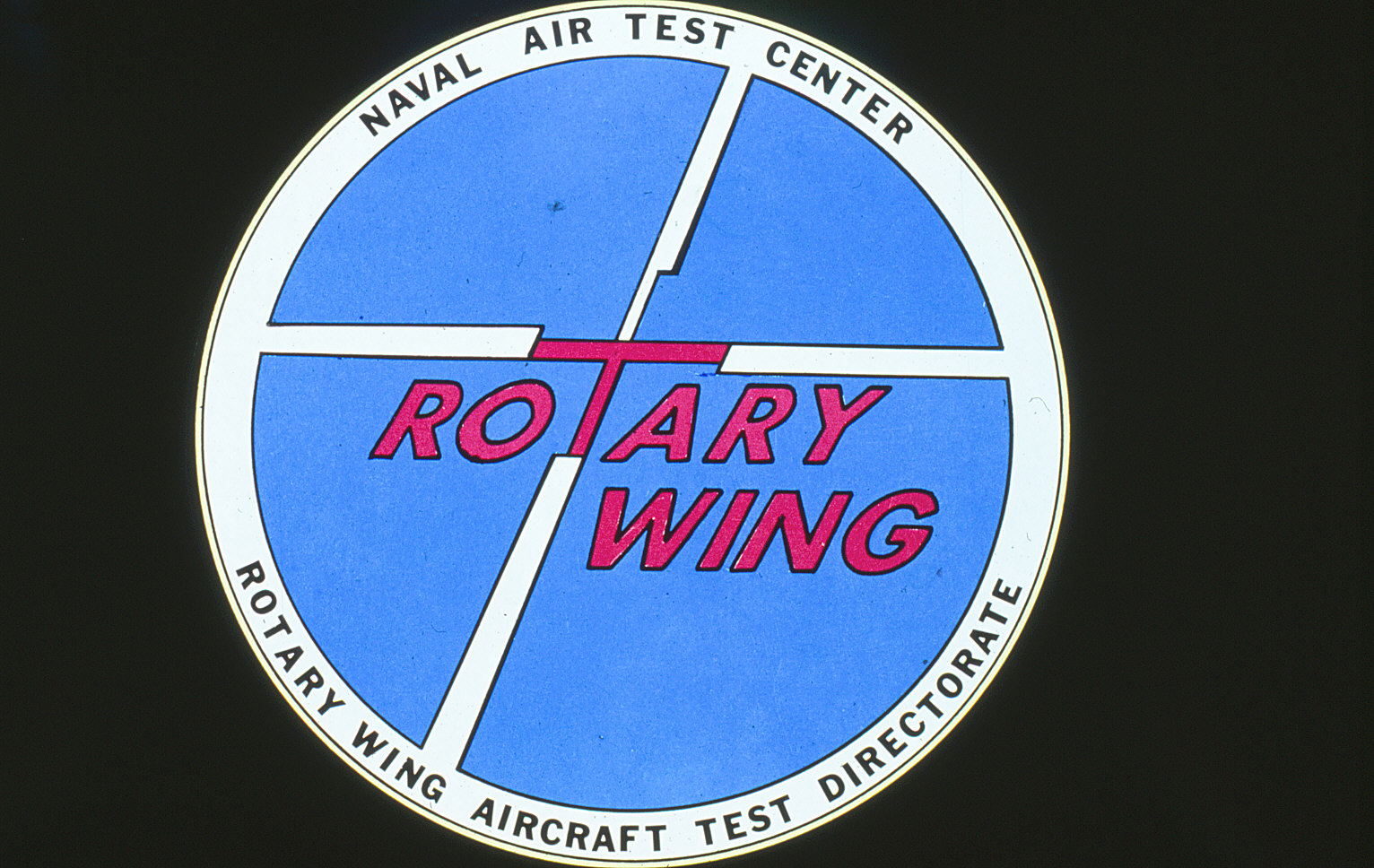
HX-21 Original Patch

Since that time, OPNAVINST 5030.4F has come into effect, changing the specifications governing squadron patches, requiring HX-21 to redesign the current insignia. The redesigned patch is symbolic in many ways and shares similarities with the original. The genesis of the new design is as follows:

Crossed Rotor Blades: The crossed blades are found in the original design and are a classic reference to helicopter flight test. The red center portion of the rotor head preserves the "T" in Rotary Wing, depicted above in the original design.
Blackjack: The Blackjack is a heraldic symbol used to illustrate the squadrons’ designation of 21, or the winning hand. The 3D image of the Blackjack grabbing the Ace is symbolic of the Test Teams taking control of the situation.

Sword: The sword shown represents the strength, courage and determination required to make the tough decisions and stand one's ground when challenged.

Color and Pattern: The patch is predominantly black due to the blackjack call sign, while adding red, yellow and white rounds out the colors of the Maryland State flag.

== Overview ==
Air Test and Evaluation Squadron TWO ONE (HX-21) performs developmental testing and evaluation of all Navy, Marine Corps and Coast Guard rotary wing/tilt-rotor aircraft, and associated sensor and weapons systems. A wide range of aircraft testing and support is provided to include flying qualities, aircraft performance and aeromechanics, shipboard suitability, tactical aircraft mission systems testing, ordnance compatibility, ballistics, system reliability and maintainability assessments, flight simulator/simulation fidelity, and aircraft software development. Support is also provided to a variety of industry and international developmental efforts to include shipboard envelope development and expansion, day and night electro-optical capabilities, and flight test technique improvements.

== Composition ==
HX-21 Formation Flight at NAS Patuxent River, Maryland

The squadron has roughly 40 Officers and 50 Enlisted personnel from the Navy, Marine Corps, and Coast Guard as well as over 400 civil service and contractor employees directly involved with maintenance, planning, safety, support and operations of its fleet of AH-1Z, CH-53K, MH-60, MQ-8B, TH-57, UH-1Y and V-22 aircraft. Most of the officers are graduates of a military test pilot school, responsible for planning, executing and reporting on all products under test. Contractor maintenance personnel are responsible for daily O-level tasking with enlisted personnel acting as government quality assurance oversight.

HX-21 is actively engaged in the development of the next generation of rotary wing/tilt-rotor and UAV systems supporting Surface Warfare (SUW), Undersea Warfare (USW), Combat Search and Rescue (CSAR), Naval Special Warfare (NSW), Airborne Mine Counter Measure (AMCM), Logistics, Maritime Supremacy and Vertical Assault missions, as well as responding to a variety of emerging and urgent requirements from current overseas contingency operations. The major flight test program platforms underway include the Bell AH-1Z Viper, Bell UH-1Y Venom, CMV-22B / MV-22B Osprey, Sikorsky CH-53E Super Stallion, Sikorsky CH-53K King Stallion, MH-60R Seahawk, MH-60S Seahawk, and the Sikorsky VH-92 Patriot.

== HX-21 Test Pilot Requirements ==
To become a test pilot, an operational pilot must be selected for and complete a military Test Pilot School such as the United States Naval Test Pilot School (USNTPS), a school for qualified fleet pilots and flight officers from military services, as well as civilian engineers. Students learn flight test techniques, how to draft and publish test reports, and how to conduct test and evaluation projects on various types of aircraft, including fixed-wing, rotary-wing, tilt-rotor aircraft, and UAVs. Pilots selected for assignment at HX-21 must be qualified and possess operational experience in rotary and/or tilt-rotor aircraft.

Former test pilots make up a high percentage of astronauts and HX-21 has been home to some notable figures, including Suni Williams, a former helicopter test pilot at HX-21, who went on to become a NASA astronaut. She was assigned to the International Space Station and was a member of Expedition 14 and Expedition 15. Suni Williams holds the record for the longest space flight for any female (195 days). Another figure is Mr. Richard "Dick" Wernecke. Mr. Wernecke served the Naval Air Test Center for 34 years as a project engineer, a Department Chief Engineer, and as the first Technical Director of the Rotary Wing Aircraft Test Directorate from 1975–1988.

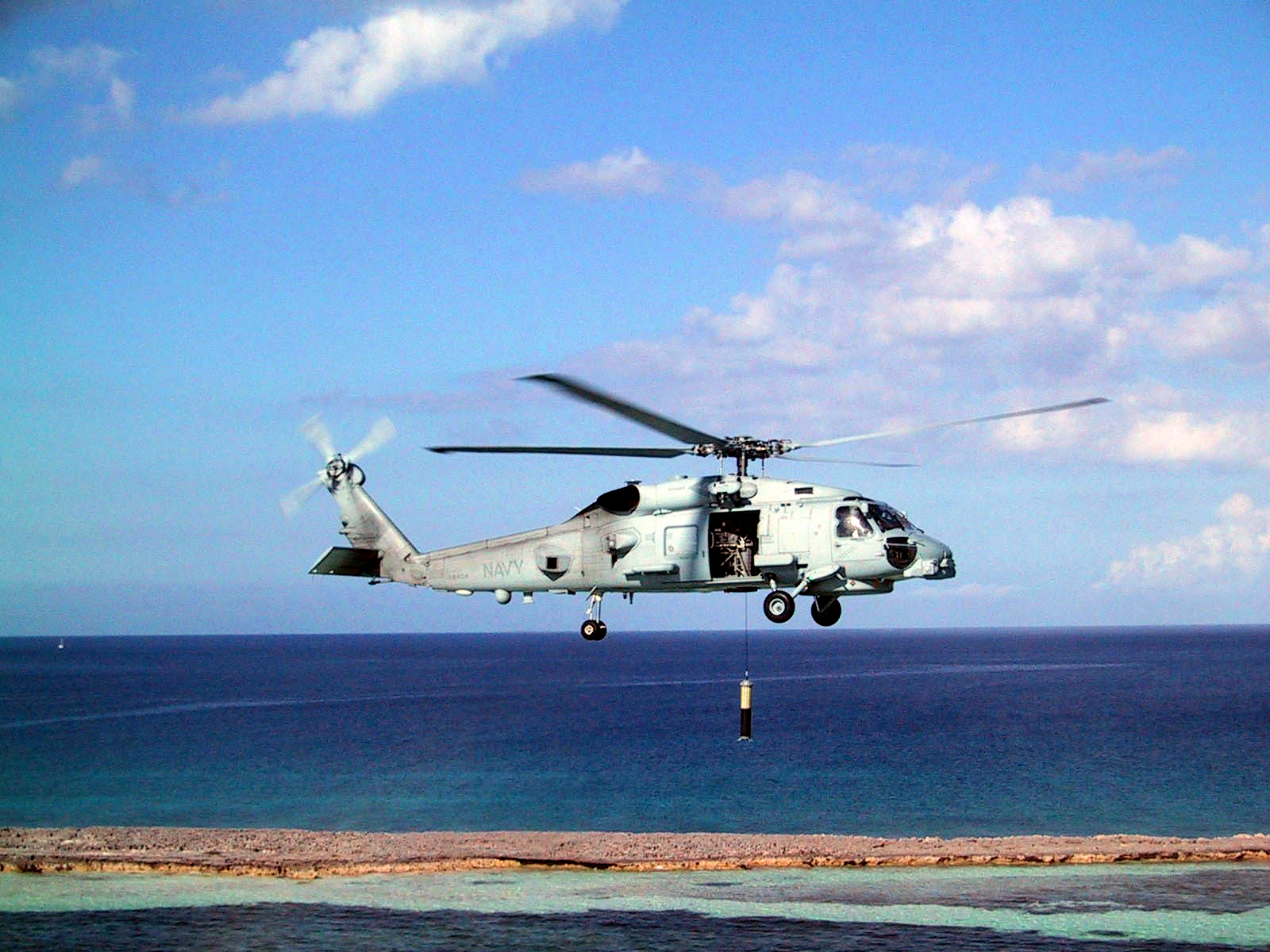
MH-60R Seahawk
