= George Island Landing, Maryland =

Unincorporated community in Maryland, United States

- Unincorporated community
- Location within Maryland
- Coordinates: 38°02′34″N 75°21′42″W
- Country: United States
- State: Maryland
- County: Worcester
- Elevation: 0 ft (0 m)
- Time zone: UTC-5 (Eastern (EST))
  - Summer (DST): UTC-4 (EDT)
- ZIP code: 21864
- Area codes: 410, 443, and 667
- GNIS feature ID: 590288

George Island Landing is an unincorporated community in Worcester County, Maryland, United States. George Island Landing is located at the eastern end of Maryland Route 366 on Chincoteague Bay.
