= Klej Grange, Maryland =

Unincorporated community in Maryland, United States

- Unincorporated community
- Location within Maryland
- Coordinates: 38°05′52″N 75°27′16″W
- Country: United States
- State: Maryland
- County: Worcester
- Elevation: 30 ft (9.1 m)
- Time zone: UTC-5 (Eastern (EST))
  - Summer (DST): UTC-4 (EDT)
- ZIP code: 21851
- Area codes: 410, 443, and 667
- GNIS feature ID: 585326

Klej Grange /ˌklɛdʒ ˈɡreɪndʒ/ is an unincorporated community three miles (5 km) northwest of Stockton in Worcester County, Maryland, United States. It is located at the intersection of Klej Grange, Betheden Church, and Ward Roads.

== Origin of name ==
The acronym "Klej" was coined by Joseph William Drexel from the initials of the names of his four daughters (Katherine, Lucy, Elizabeth, and Josephine), and was combined with "Grange", perhaps a reference to the National Grange.

== History ==
First known as Trap, or Traptown, then for many years in the nineteenth century as Lindseyville, the community originally arose at the crossing of the roads leading from Mattapony Landing on the Pocomoke River to Sandy Hill (later Stockton) and from Snow Hill to Stevens Landing (now Pocomoke City). In 1878, Drexel purchased a substantial part of the estate of Matthias Lindsey, after whose family the crossroads had been known, to create a planned community where low cost farmland would be offered to benefit the poor. Drexel named Austin Thomas Byrne as superintendent of the project; Byrne surveyed and platted Drexel's agrarian-industrial experiment.

Drexel and his brother Anthony, the founder of Drexel University, were sons of Francis Martin Drexel, founder of the banking house of Drexel & Co. A "Famous Americans" biographical capsule notes of Joseph W. Drexel:

Among his philanthropic interests is a 200-acre (0.81 km^{2}) farm near New York, where persons without work are lodged, clothed, fed, and taught agriculture until places are procured for them. He owns a large tract of land Klej Grange in Maryland, which has been divided into lots, and houses, mills, etc., erected upon them. These farms are sold to poor persons at cost. About 7,000 acres (28 km^{2}) in Michigan is destined for the same purpose.

Drexel's project was cut short by his death in 1888. His widow and daughters had other interests and soon sold the property, much of it eventually deeded to the Worcester Realty Co. As with many similar projects, the community has today relapsed into the rural obscurity from which Drexel briefly roused it.
