= Atlantic Test Range =

US Navy test range

Coordinates: 38.49°N 74.98°W

The Atlantic Test Range is a test range of the United States Navy that extends from New Jersey to North Carolina. Administration for the Atlantic Test Range is headquartered within the aircraft division of Naval Air Station Patuxent River.
