= Chincoteague Bay =

Bay in Maryland and Accomack County, Virginia

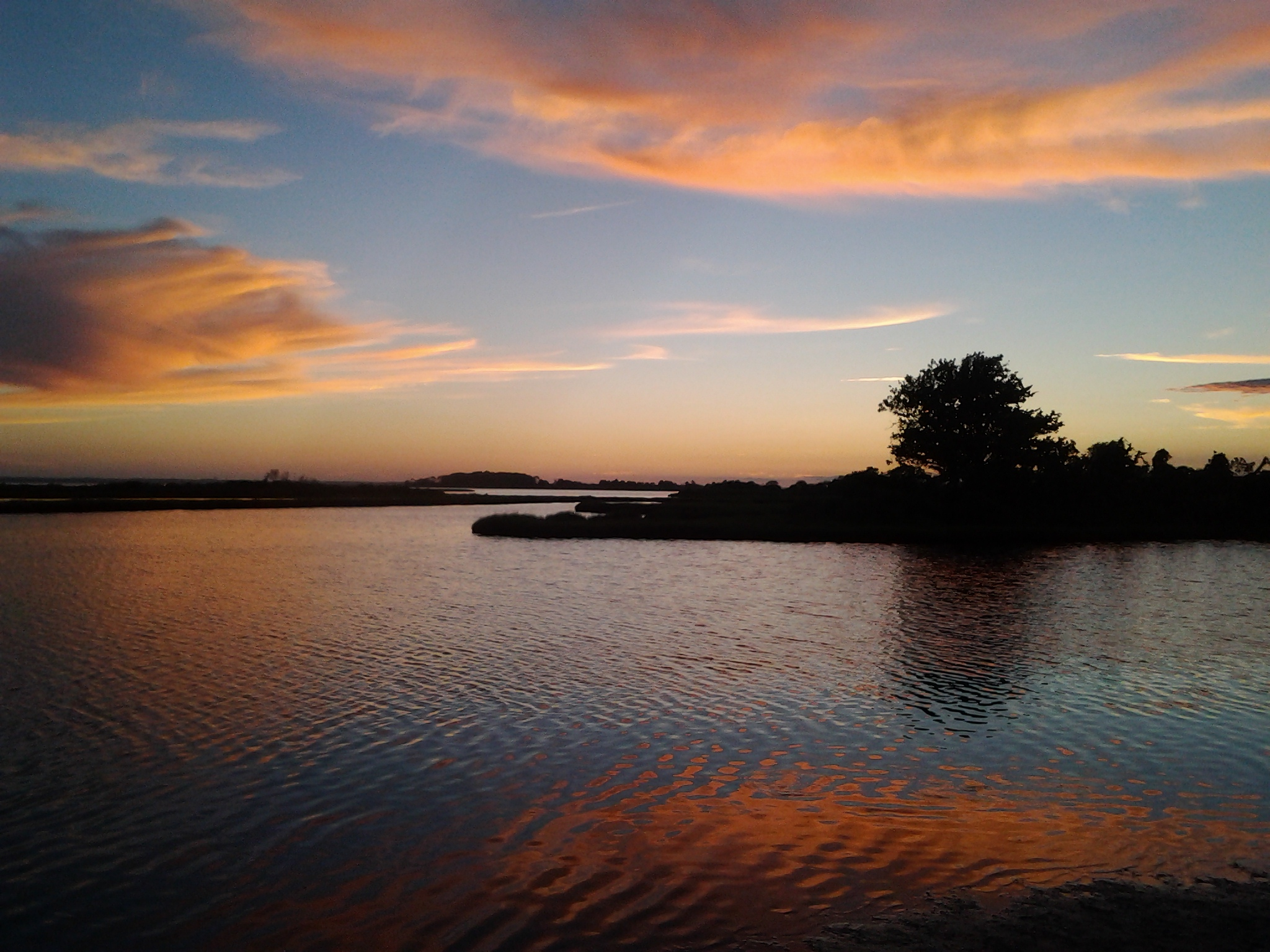
- Sunset at Chincoteague Bay

- Location within Maryland
- Location: Worcester County, Maryland Accomack County, Virginia
- Coordinates: 38°07′00″N 75°14′54″W
- Type: Bay
- Surface elevation: 0 feet (0 m)

Chincoteague Bay (locally /ˈʃɪŋkətiːɡ, -tɪɡ, ˌʃɪŋkəˈtiːɡ/) is a lagoon between the Atlantic barrier islands of Assateague and Chincoteague and the mainland of Worcester County, Maryland, and northern Accomack County, Virginia. At the bay's northern end, where it narrows between Assateague and Sinepuxent Neck, it becomes Sinepuxent Bay; Chincoteague Bay's southern end drains into the Atlantic Ocean via Queen Sound and Chincoteague Inlet. No major river flows into Chincoteague Bay—its largest tributaries are Newport Creek in Worcester County and Swans Gut Creek in Accomack County.

During the late 19th and early 20th centuries, Chincoteague Bay was well known for its shellfish industry, which shipped oysters, crabs, and clams to Baltimore, Philadelphia, and New York. The shellfish industry was based in several landings and small towns: Taylors Landing at Girdletree, Maryland, George Island Landing at Stockton, Maryland, and Franklin City and Greenbackville in Virginia. Girdletree, Stockton, and Franklin City were all on the now-defunct southern end of what is today the Maryland and Delaware Railroad that ran south from Snow Hill, Maryland. Overfishing depleted shellfish stocks, which have still not recovered.

Currently, the largest settlements on the Bay are Public Landing, Maryland, Greenbackville, Captain's Cove (a planned residential community near Greenbackville), and the town of Chincoteague.

The bay is an important stop on the Atlantic Flyway. The E.A. Vaughn Wildlife Management Area and parts of the Sinepuxent Bay Wildlife Management Area are located on the Maryland portion of the Bay, and the Assateague Island National Seashore and Chincoteague National Wildlife Refuge form its eastern shore.
