= Stockton, Maryland =

- CDP
- Location of Stockton, Maryland
- Coordinates: 38°3′26″N 75°25′0″W
- Country: United States
- State: Maryland
- County: Worcester

Area
  - Total: 1.71 sq mi (4.42 km^{2})
  - Land: 1.70 sq mi (4.41 km^{2})
  - Water: 0.0039 sq mi (0.01 km^{2})
- Elevation: 33 ft (10 m)

Population (2020)
  - Total: 91
  - Density: 53.5/sq mi (20.65/km^{2})
- Time zone: UTC−5 (Eastern (EST))
  - Summer (DST): UTC−4 (EDT)
- ZIP code: 21864
- Area codes: 410, 443
- FIPS code: 24-75200
- GNIS feature ID: 0591353

Stockton is a census-designated place (CDP) in Worcester County, Maryland, United States. The population was 92 at the 2010 census. It is part of the Salisbury, Maryland-Delaware Metropolitan Statistical Area.

== History ==
Stockton, originally called Sandy Hill, grew up at the crossing of the post road from Snow Hill south to Virginia (whose track is generally followed by modern Maryland Route 12) with the road from Mattapony Landing on the Pocomoke River to the Chincoteague Bay (the eastern part of which is now Maryland Route 366), where small ocean-going vessels could drop anchor. The landing on Chincoteague Bay came to be known as George Island Landing. Settlement in the area began in the 1660s, when the area was still part of Somerset County. Worcester County was separated from Somerset in 1742, and by 1774 Sandy Hill had grown large enough to merit a chapel of ease within All Hallows' Parish, today called Holy Cross Chapel. Sandy Hill, unlike neighboring Girdletree, was never incorporated, but in 1870 the name of the town was officially changed, by act of the legislature, from Sandy Hill to Stockton, commemorating the Rev. Thomas H. Stockton, a prominent Methodist minister. In 1872 the Worcester County election district which took its name from Sandy Hill was renamed Stockton.

In 1876, a railroad (which would eventually become part of the Pennsylvania Railroad) was laid from Franklin City and Greenbackville in Virginia to Snow Hill. The line's main purpose was to haul seafood harvested from the Atlantic Ocean and Chincoteague Bay to Philadelphia, but the line also carried passengers. To avoid confusion with other Stocktons around the country, the station at Stockton was named Hursley Station.

The center of Stockton was destroyed by fire in 1906, but was soon rebuilt, with many of the new buildings constructed of brick. During the late 19th and early 20th centuries, Stockton boasted a hotel, five churches, a post office, three stores, a canning factory, two sawmills, and two barrel factories. However, the overfishing of Chincoteague Bay led to a permanent decline in the commercial seafood industry.

A new Stockton High School was dedicated in 1926. Grades 7-11 were discontinued in 1942, but first through sixth grades continued until 1960, when the school was closed. Stockton's only bank failed in 1929. Passenger trains ended service in the late 1940s, and the last freight trainmade its final run through Stockton in approximately 1955. Holy Cross Chapel stopped holding regular services in 1943. Gunby Presbyterian Church holds only one service per month. The Stockton Poultry Plant opened as World War II ended, but closed around 1970. Today, Stockton residents are as likely to work at NASA's Wallops Island Flight Facility on the Eastern Shore of Virginia than to be farmers or watermen. The post office was closed in 2012, and no business of any kind is now in operation.

== Geography ==
Stockton is located at 38°3′26″N 75°25′0″W (38.057233, −75.416661).

According to the United States Census Bureau, the CDP has a total area of 1.7 square miles (4.4 km^{2}), all land.

Maryland routes 12 and 366 intersect in the center of Stockton.

An extensive network of manmade canals is located approximately two miles east of Stockton.

== Demographics ==
Historical population
Census	Pop.	Note	%±
2000	143		—
2010	92		−35.7%
2020	91		−1.1%
U.S. Decennial Census

Stockton, Maryland – Racial and ethnic composition Note: the US Census treats Hispanic/Latino as an ethnic category. This table excludes Latinos from the racial categories and assigns them to a separate category. Hispanics/Latinos may be of any race.
Race / Ethnicity (NH = Non-Hispanic)	Pop 2000	Pop 2010	Pop 2020	% 20010	% 2010	% 2020
White alone (NH)	53	62	61	37.06%	67.39%	67.03%
Black or African American alone (NH)	87	23	24	60.84%	25.00%	26.37%
Native American or Alaska Native alone (NH)	2	0	0	1.40%	0.00%	0.00%
Asian alone (NH)	0	1	0	0.00%	1.09%	0.00%
Pacific Islander alone (NH)	0	0	0	0.00%	0.00%	0.00%
Some Other Race alone (NH)	0	0	0	0.00%	0.00%	0.00%
Mixed Race or Multi-Racial (NH)	1	2	6	0.70%	2.17%	6.59%
Hispanic or Latino (any race)	0	4	0	0.00%	4.35%	0.00%
Total	143	92	91	100.00%	100.00%	100.00%

As of the census of 2000, there were 143 people, 49 households, and 39 families residing in the CDP. The population density was 82.8 inhabitants per square mile (32.0/km^{2}). There were 55 housing units at an average density of 31.8 per square mile (12.3/km^{2}). The racial makeup of the CDP was 37.06% White, 60.84% African American, 1.40% Native American, and 0.70% from two or more races.

There were 49 households, out of which 28.6% had children under the age of 18 living with them, 51.0% were married couples living together, 26.5% had a female householder with no husband present, and 20.4% were non-families. 16.3% of all households were made up of individuals, and 8.2% had someone living alone who was 65 years of age or older. The average household size was 2.92 and the average family size was 3.23.

In the CDP, the population was spread out, with 25.9% under the age of 18, 10.5% from 18 to 24, 25.9% from 25 to 44, 21.7% from 45 to 64, and 16.1% who were 65 years of age or older. The median age was 37 years. For every 100 females, there were 66.3 males. For every 100 females age 18 and over, there were 68.3 males.

The median income for a household in the CDP was $14,583, and the median income for a family was $25,833. Males had a median income of $13,750 versus $0 for females. The per capita income for the CDP was $5,776. There were 42.3% of families and 45.0% of the population living below the poverty line, including 63.8% of under eighteens and none of those over 64.
