= Girdletree, Maryland =

- CDP
- Location of Girdletree, Maryland
- Coordinates: 38°5′40″N 75°24′0″W
- Country: United States
- State: Maryland
- County: Worcester

Area
  - Total: 0.68 sq mi (1.77 km^{2})
  - Land: 0.68 sq mi (1.77 km^{2})
  - Water: 0 sq mi (0.00 km^{2})
- Elevation: 36 ft (11 m)

Population (2020)
  - Total: 141
  - Density: 206.6/sq mi (79.76/km^{2})
- Time zone: UTC−5 (Eastern (EST))
  - Summer (DST): UTC−4 (EDT)
- ZIP code: 21829
- Area codes: 410, 443
- FIPS code: 24-32250
- GNIS feature ID: 0590303

Girdletree is a census-designated place in Worcester County, Maryland, United States. The population was 141 at the 2020 census. It is part of the Salisbury, Maryland-Delaware Metropolitan Statistical Area.

== Community ==
This Census Designated Place has many different establishments including a United States Postal Service has a station here. There multiple churches and a fire department offering Emergency Medical Services and Fire Rescue services.

== Geography ==
Girdletree is located at 38°5′40″N 75°24′0″W (38.094394, −75.400132).

According to the United States Census Bureau, the CDP has a total area of 0.7 square miles (1.8 km^{2}), all land.

== Demographics ==
Historical population
Census	Pop.	Note	%±
2020	141		—
U.S. Decennial Census

As of the census of 2000, there were 117 people, 48 households, and 32 families residing in the CDP. The population density was 212.86 inhabitants per square mile (82.19/km^{2}). There were 56 housing units at an average density of 83.6 per square mile (32.3/km^{2}). The racial makeup of the CDP was 71.79% White, 23.08% African American, 1.71% from other races, and 3.42% from two or more races.

There were 48 households, out of which 25.0% had children under the age of 18 living with them, 45.8% were married couples living together, 18.8% had a female householder with no husband present, and 33.3% were non-families. 22.9% of all households were made up of individuals, and 12.5% had someone living alone who was 65 years of age or older. The average household size was 2.44 and the average family size was 2.97.

In the CDP, the population was spread out, with 26.5% under the age of 18, 7.7% from 18 to 24, 29.1% from 25 to 44, 21.4% from 45 to 64, and 15.4% who were 65 years of age or older. The median age was 38 years. For every 100 females, there were 82.8 males. For every 100 females age 18 and over, there were 75.5 males.

The median income for a household in the CDP was $27,750, and the median income for a family was $27,321. Males had a median income of $38,636 versus $15,865 for females. The per capita income for the CDP was $20,951. There were 11.8% of families and 11.8% of the population living below the poverty line, including 32.3% of under eighteens and none of those over 64.
