= List of state highways in Maryland shorter than one mile (2–699) =

Highway names
- Interstates: Interstate X (I-X)
- US Highways: U.S. Route X (US X)
- State: Maryland Route X (MD X)

System links
- Maryland highway system; Interstate; US; State; Scenic Byways

The following is a list of state highways in Maryland shorter than one mile (1.6 km) in length with route numbers between 2 and 699. Most of these highways act as service roads, old alignments of more prominent highways, or connectors between one or more highways. Many of these highways are unsigned and have multiple segments with the same number. Several of these highways have their own articles; those highways are summarized here and a link is provided to the main article. This list does not include highways where at least one highway of that number is at least one mile in length. All highways at least one mile in length have their own article. The highways shorter than one mile with the same number are covered in the main article for the highway.

== MD 79 ==
Maryland Route 79
- Location: Rosemont
- Length: 0.85 mi (1,370 m)

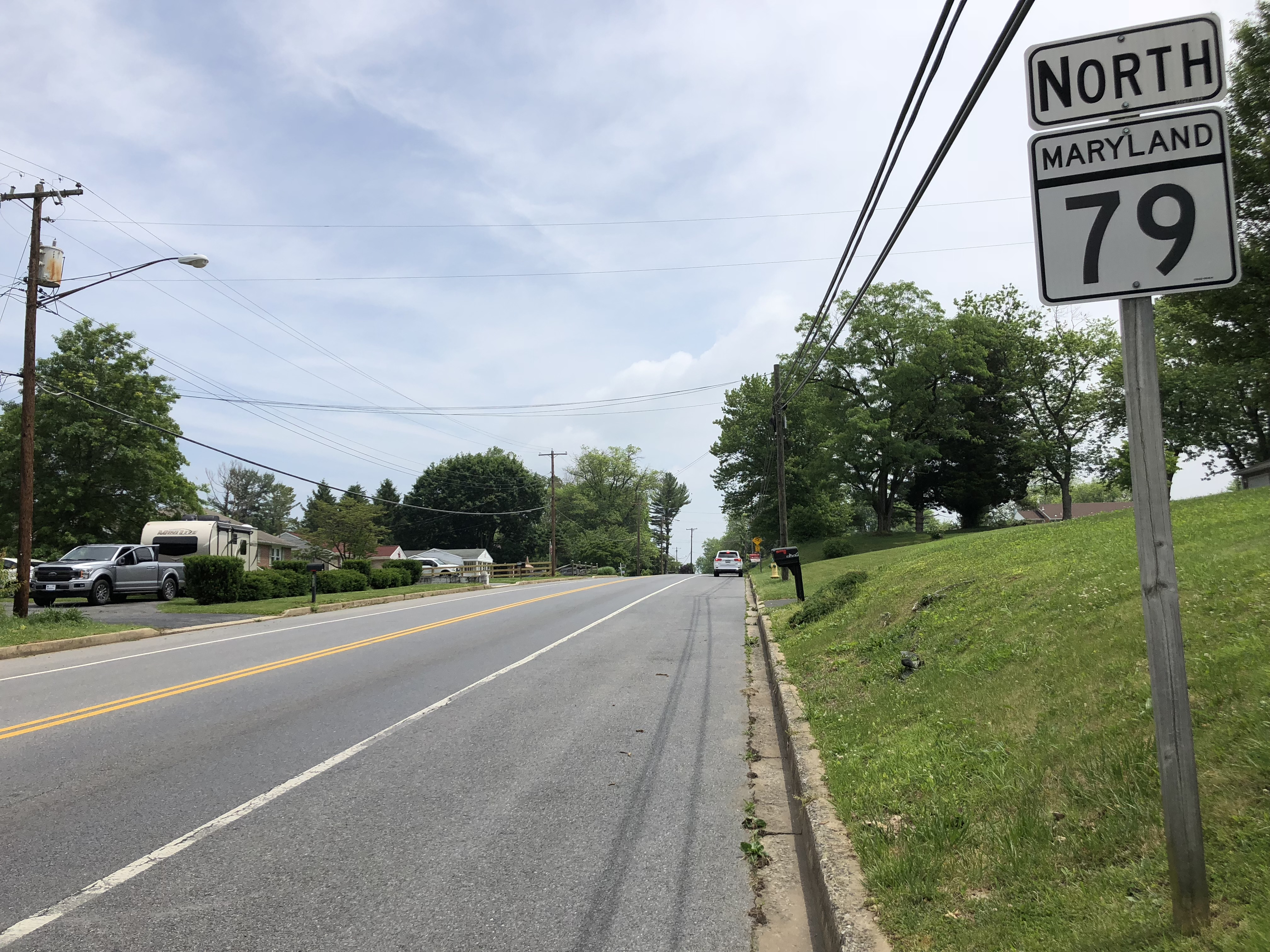
View north from the south end of MD 79 at MD 17 and MD 464 in Rosemont

Maryland Route 79 is the designation for the state-maintained portion of Petersville Road, which runs 0.85 miles (1.37 km) from MD 17 and MD 464 in Rosemont north to a bridge over the Little Catoctin Creek on the northern border of Rosemont. MD 79 begins at a four-way intersection on the boundary between the town of Brunswick to the south and the village of Rosemont to the north. Petersville Road continues south as MD 17 into Brunswick; MD 17 also heads west along Burkittsville Road. The eastern leg of the intersection is MD 464 (Souder Road). MD 79 heads northeast as a two-lane undivided road through a residential area where the highway meets the eastern end of Rosemont Drive, which is unsigned MD 871G. The state highway comes to its northern terminus at a bridge over Little Catoctin Creek on the northern border of Rosemont. Past the northern terminus, Petersville Road continues north as a county road toward MD 180 (Jefferson Pike) in Petersville.

Petersville Road was constructed as a 14-foot (4.3 m) wide macadam-surfaced highway from Jefferson Pike (designated US 340 and later MD 180) south to Brunswick in 1916. When state highways were first numbered in Maryland in 1927, the portion of Petersville Road south of what is now Rosemont Drive became MD 33; MD 33 became MD 17 in 1940. Petersville Road from Rosemont north to Petersville was later marked as MD 79. MD 79's modern bridge over Little Catoctin Creek was built in 1941 after the previous bridge was carried away by a flood that year. MD 79 was extended south to its current southern terminus in 1968 when MD 17 was relocated to its present course through Rosemont and MD 464 was extended west along Souder Road to its present terminus to form the fourth leg of that intersection. On October 31, 2016, the northern terminus of MD 79 was cut back from MD 180 to its current location when the section of Petersville Road between the Little Catoctin Creek bridge on the northern border of Rosemont and MD 180 was transferred to county maintenance.

Browse numbered routes
← MD 77	MD	→ MD 80

== MD 169 ==
Maryland Route 169
- Location: Linthicum
- Length: 0.97 mi (1,560 m)

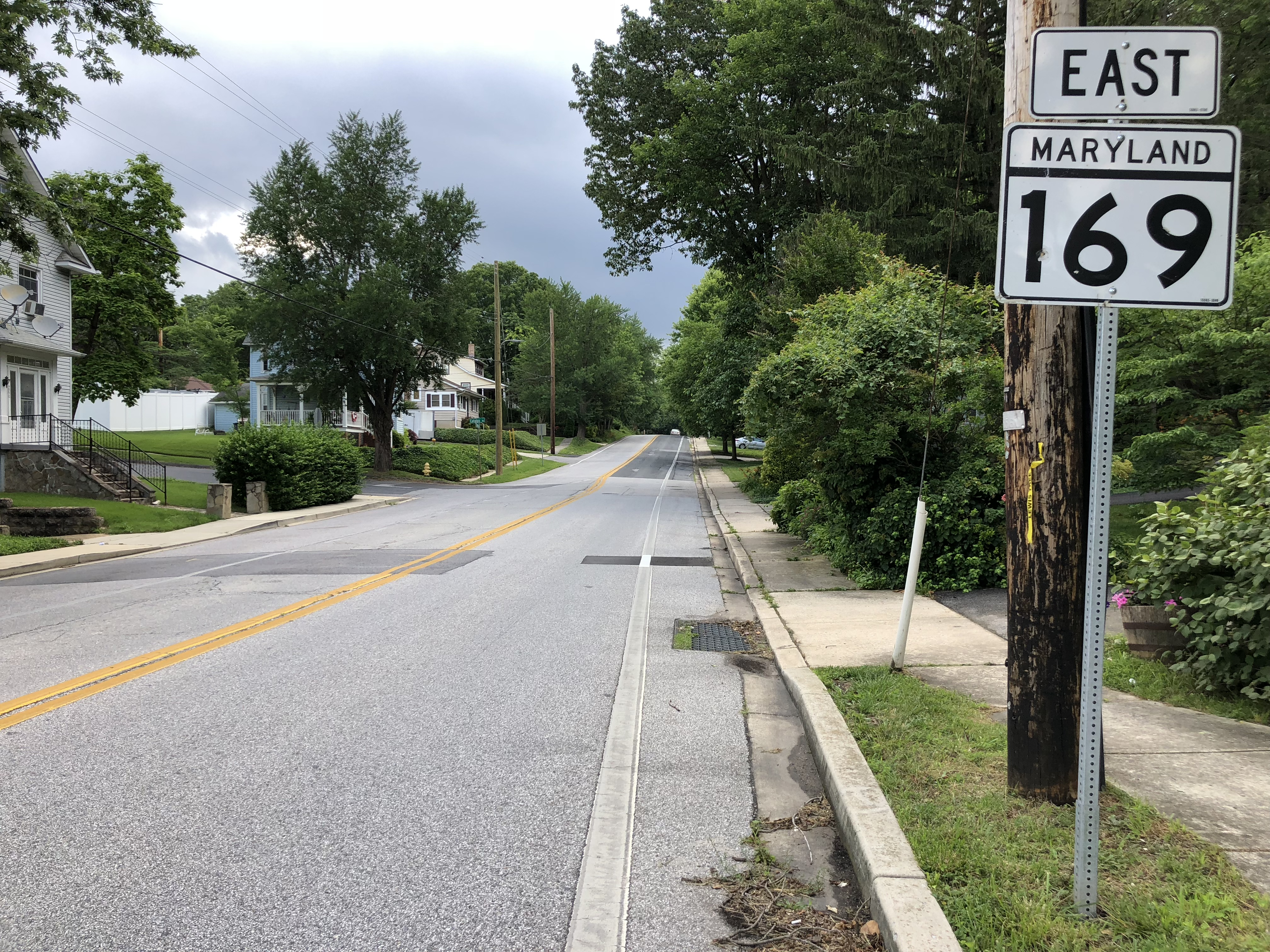
View east along MD 169 at MD 170 in Linthicum

Maryland Route 169 is the designation for Maple Road, a 0.97-mile (1.56 km) state highway in Linthicum in northwestern Anne Arundel County. The highway begins at Hammonds Ferry Road and heads east as a two-lane undivided road through a residential area. MD 169 has a grade crossing of MTA Maryland's Baltimore Light RailLink just prior to its intersection with MD 170 (Camp Meade Road). The highway reaches its eastern terminus at MD 648 (Baltimore–Annapolis Boulevard).

Browse numbered routes
← MD 168	→ MD 170

== MD 172 ==
Maryland Route 172
- Location: Orchard Beach–Baltimore
- Length: 0.17 mi (270 m)

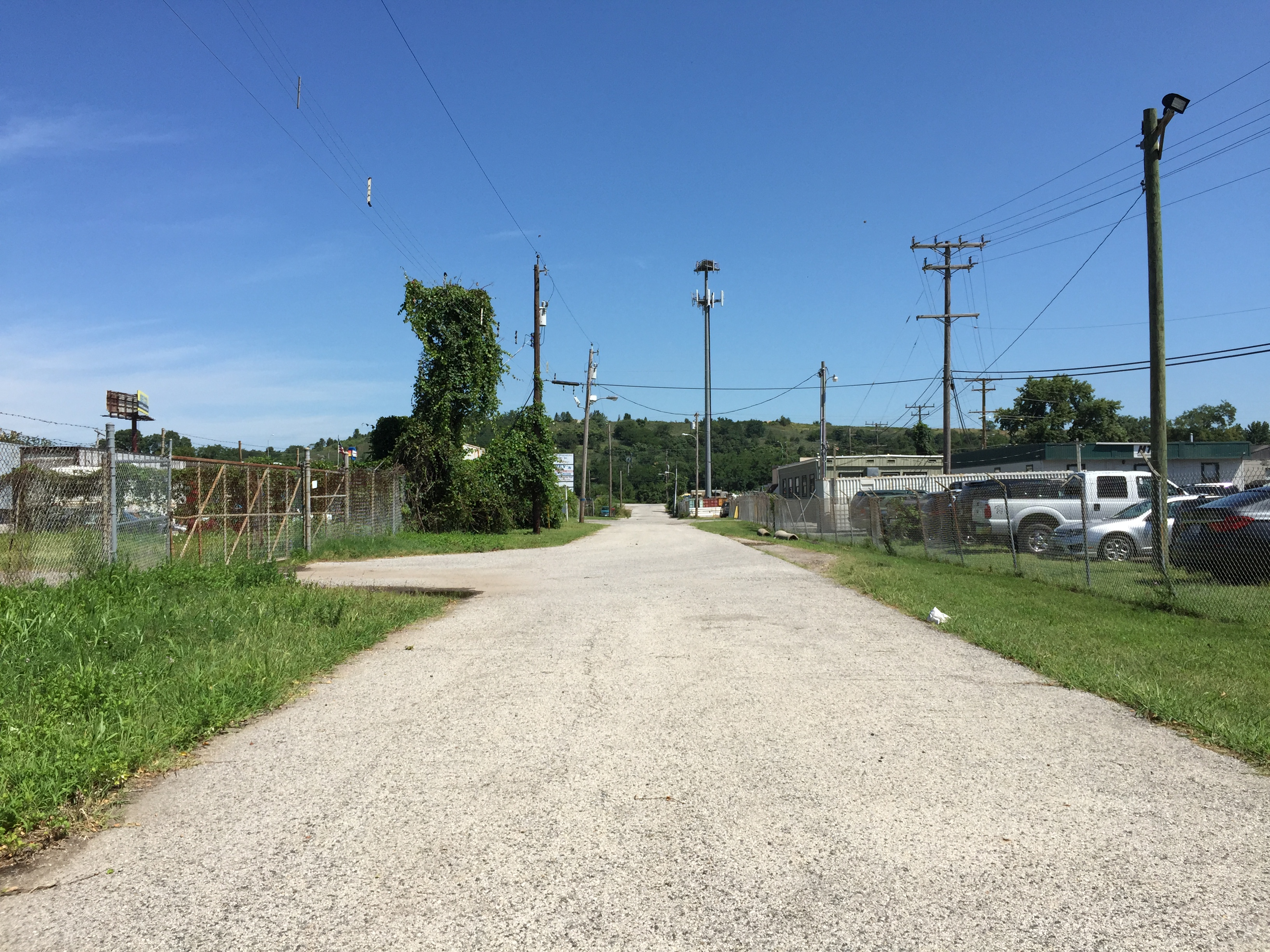
View north from the south end of MD 172 in Orchard Beach

Maryland Route 172 is the unsigned designation for Arundel Cove Avenue, a 0.17 mi (0.27 km) route that runs from railroad tracks in Orchard Beach in Anne Arundel County north to MD 173 (Hawkins Point Road) in the city of Baltimore. This state highway once served as the entrance to the United States Coast Guard Yard. The yard is now accessed from MD 173 just to the west of MD 172. MD 172 was constructed by 1930.

Browse numbered routes
← MD 171	→ MD 173

== MD 181 ==
Maryland Route 181
- Location: Annapolis
- Length: 0.16 mi (260 m)
- Existed: 2009–present

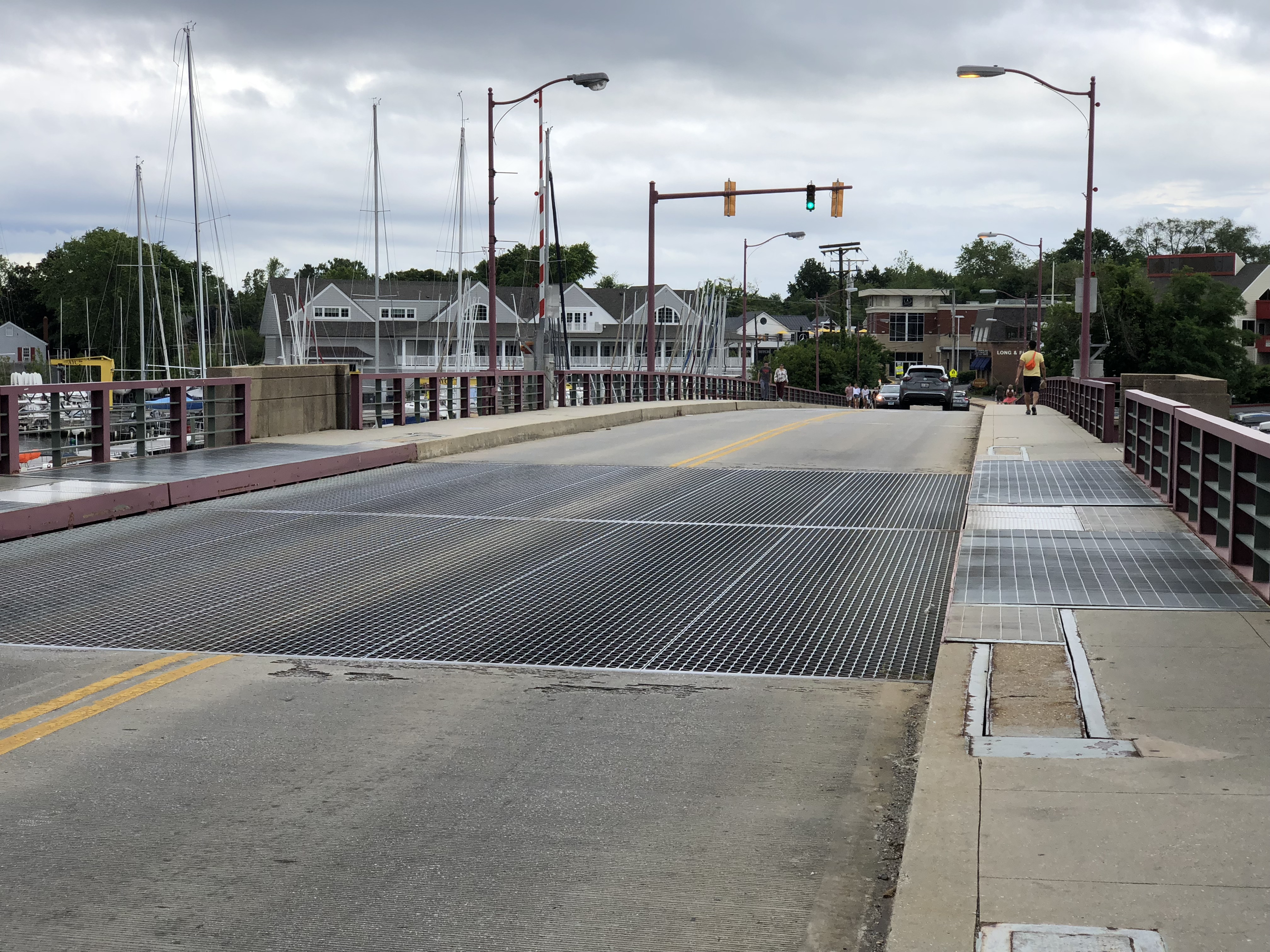
View south along MD 181 in Annapolis

Maryland Route 181 is the unsigned designation for the Sixth Street drawbridge over the Spa Creek in Annapolis, Anne Arundel County. The route was designated in 2009 and is 0.16 mi (0.26 km) long.

Browse numbered routes
← MD 180	→ MD 182

== MD 219 ==
Maryland Route 219
- Location: Oakland
- Length: 0.22 mi (350 m)

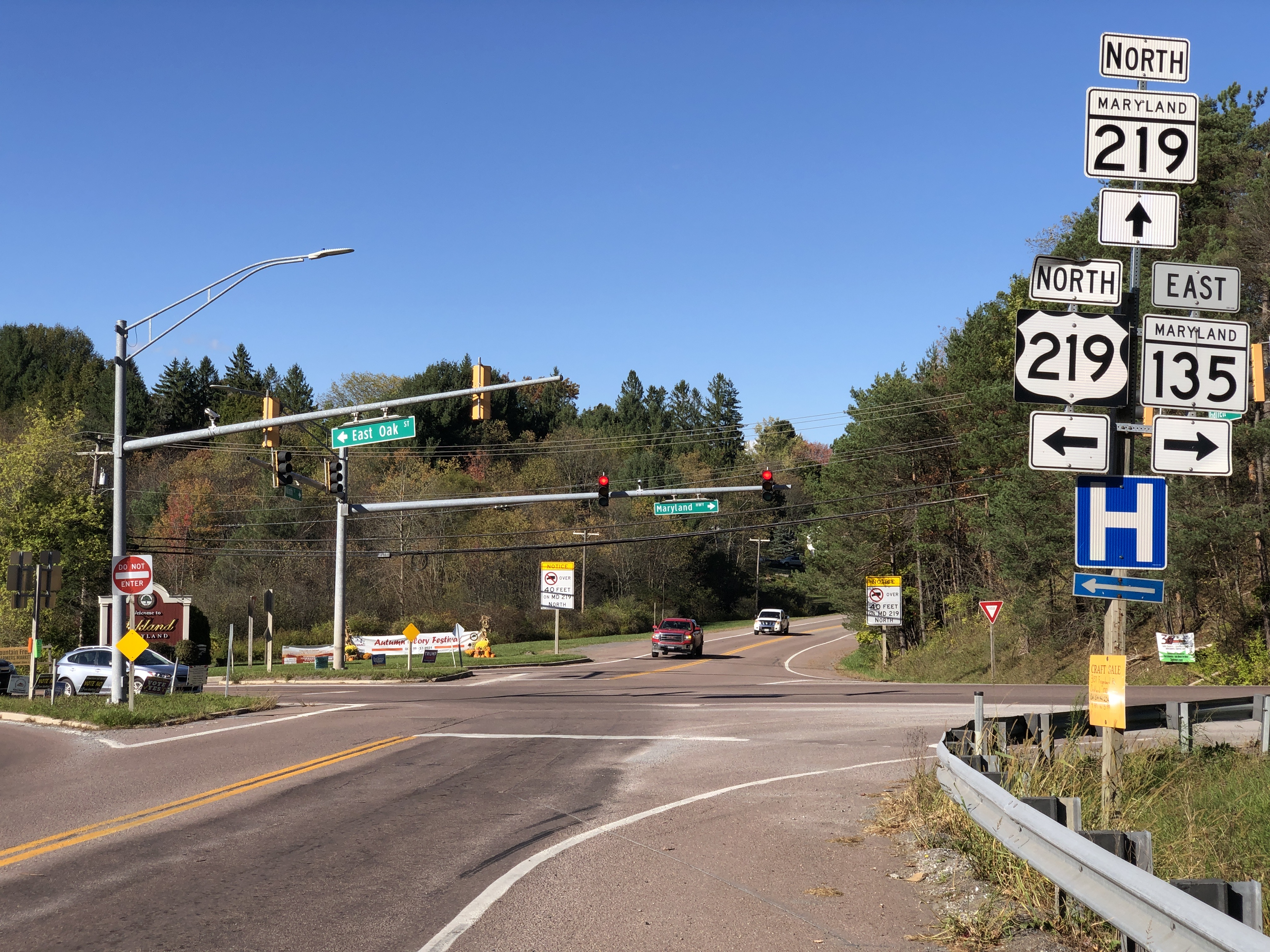
US 219 northbound at MD 219 and MD 135 in Oakland

Maryland Route 219 is the designation for Ninth Street, a two-lane undivided road which runs 0.22 miles (0.35 km) from the intersection of US 219 and MD 135 north to High Street within Oakland in Garrett County. MD 219 is state-maintained from US 219 to Green Street and maintained by the town of Oakland from there to High Street. The state highway follows the southernmost part of the alignment of the future Oakland Bypass. The route was first posted circa 2022 after previously being unsigned.

Browse numbered routes
← US 219	→ US 220

== MD 221 ==
Maryland Route 221A
- Location: Largo
- Length: 0.59 mi (950 m)
- Existed: 2003–present

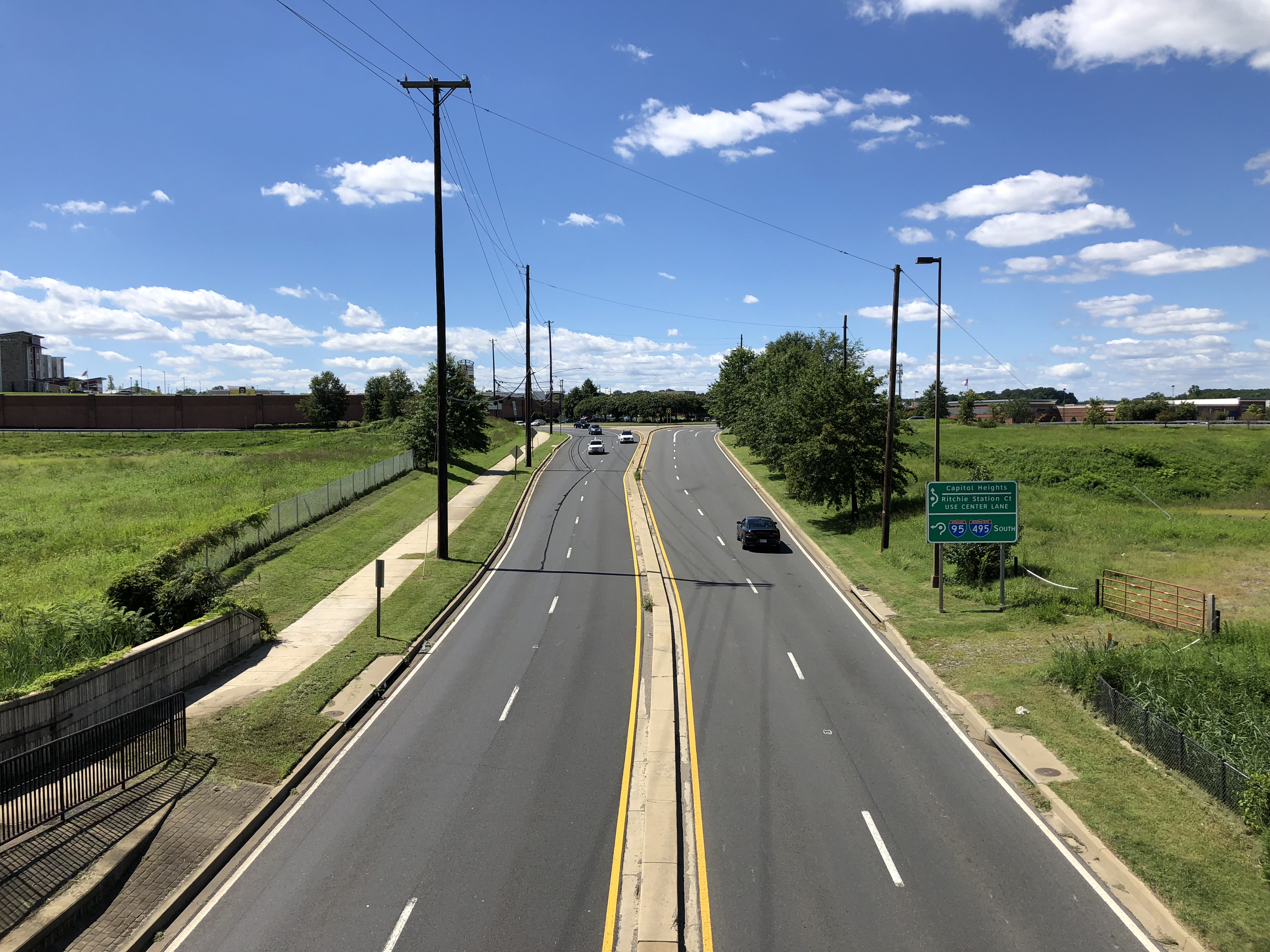
View west along MD 221 at I-95/I-495 in Forestville

Maryland Route 221A is the unsigned designation for a 0.58 mi (0.93 km) section of Ritchie–Marlboro Road around that highway's dumbbell interchange with I-95/I-495 (Capital Beltway) at Exit 13 in Largo, Prince George's County.

Browse numbered routes
← US 220	→ US 222

== MD 250 ==
Maryland Route 250A
- Location: Pocomoke City
- Length: 0.19 mi (310 m)

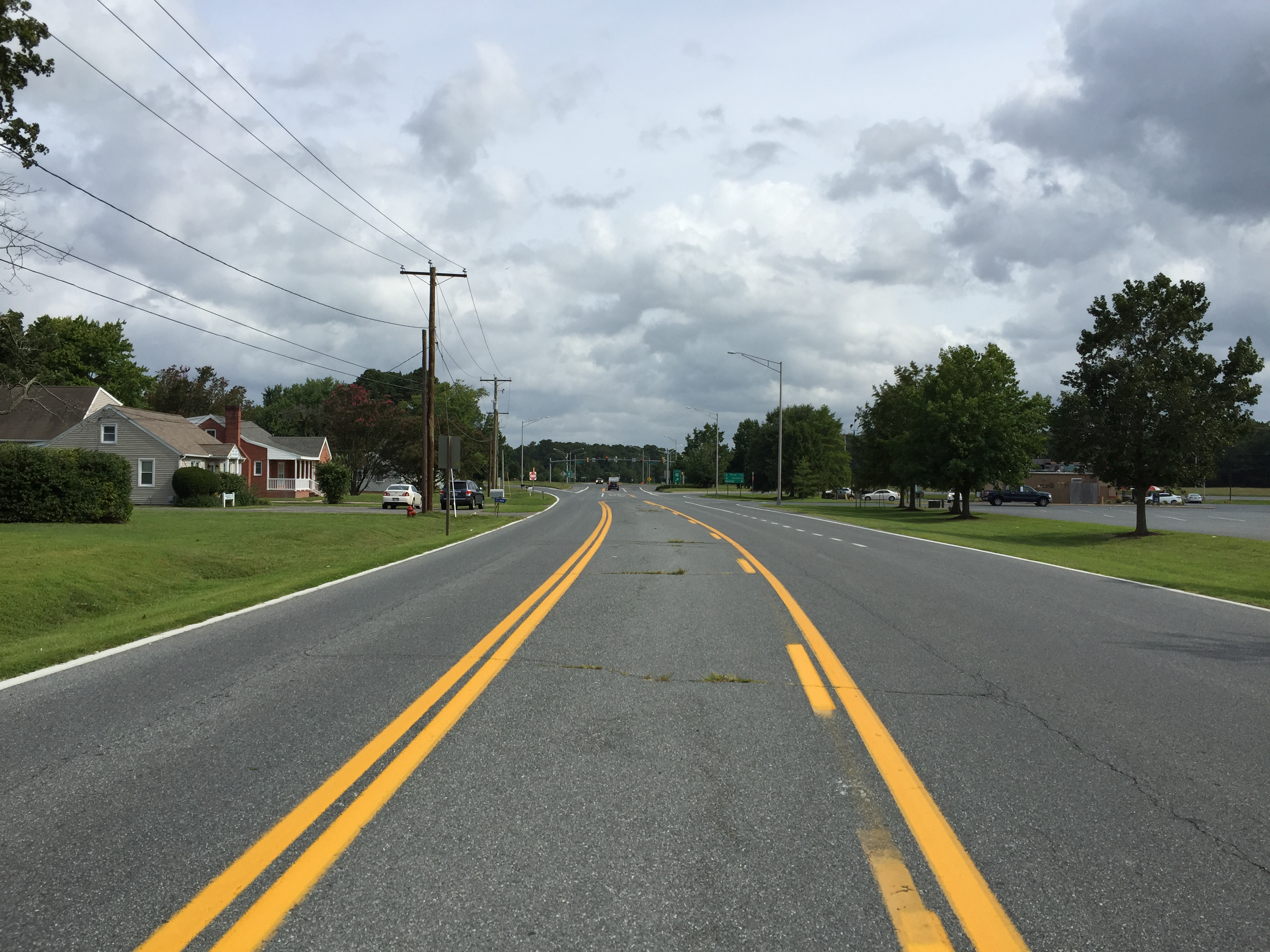
MD 250A approaching US 13 and US 113 in Pocomoke City

Maryland Route 250A is the unsigned designation for Old Virginia Road, which runs 0.19 mi (0.31 km) from US 13 Business east to the intersection of US 13 and US 113 within Pocomoke City in Worcester County. The state highway is the southernmost part of the second alignment of US 113 in Pocomoke City. MD 250A was assigned shortly after US 113 was rolled back to terminate at the Pocomoke City Bypass, US 13, in the 1960s.

Browse numbered routes
← MD 249	→ MD 253

== MD 268 ==
Maryland Route 268
- Location: Elkton
- Length: 0.95 mi (1,530 m)
- Existed: 1968–present

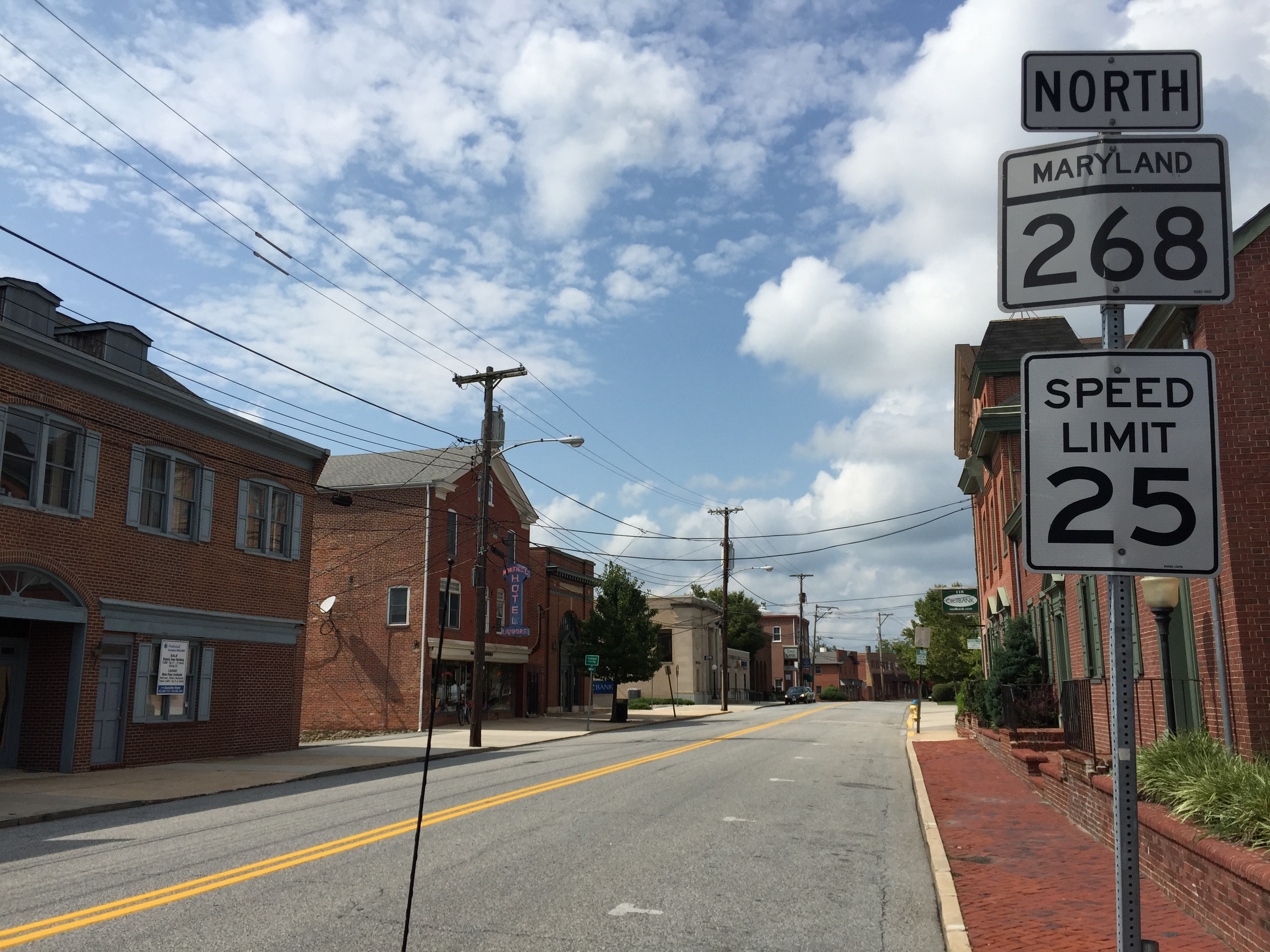
View north at the south end of MD 268 at Main Street in Elkton

Maryland Route 268, which is known as North Street, runs 0.95 miles (1.53 km) from Main Street north to MD 279 within the town of Elkton in eastern Cecil County. The highway begins at Main Street, which is one-way eastbound, in downtown Elkton; the parallel street that allows westbound traffic and provides access to Union Hospital and MD 213 (Bridge Street) is High Street one block to the north. MD 268 heads north as a two-lane undivided road and passes a block to the east of the Elkton Armory. The highway veers slightly to the west to cross over Amtrak's Northeast Corridor railroad line. The old alignment, Old North Road, consists of pair of stubs on the south and north sides of the tracks with unsigned designations MD 727 and MD 727A, respectively. MD 268 continues north between Big Elk Creek to the east and Elkton Middle School to the west before reaching its northern terminus at MD 279, which heads west as Newark Avenue and east as Elkton Road toward Newark, Delaware.

MD 268 is the old alignment of MD 279 within Elkton. North Street was paved as a 15-foot-wide (4.6 m) concrete road by 1921. The original North Street overpass of the Pennsylvania Railroad (now Amtrak) was constructed between 1930 and 1934. The bypassed street stubs to the closed grade crossing were designated MD 727 and MD 727A in 1949. MD 268 was assigned to North Avenue after MD 279 was extended west to US 40 to bypass the center of Elkton in 1968. The highway's current bridge across the Amtrak Northeast Corridor was constructed between 1986 and 1988.

=== References ===
Browse numbered routes
← MD 267	→ I-270

== MD 284 ==
Maryland Route 284
- Location: Chesapeake City
- Length: 0.25 mi (400 m)
- Existed: 1927–present

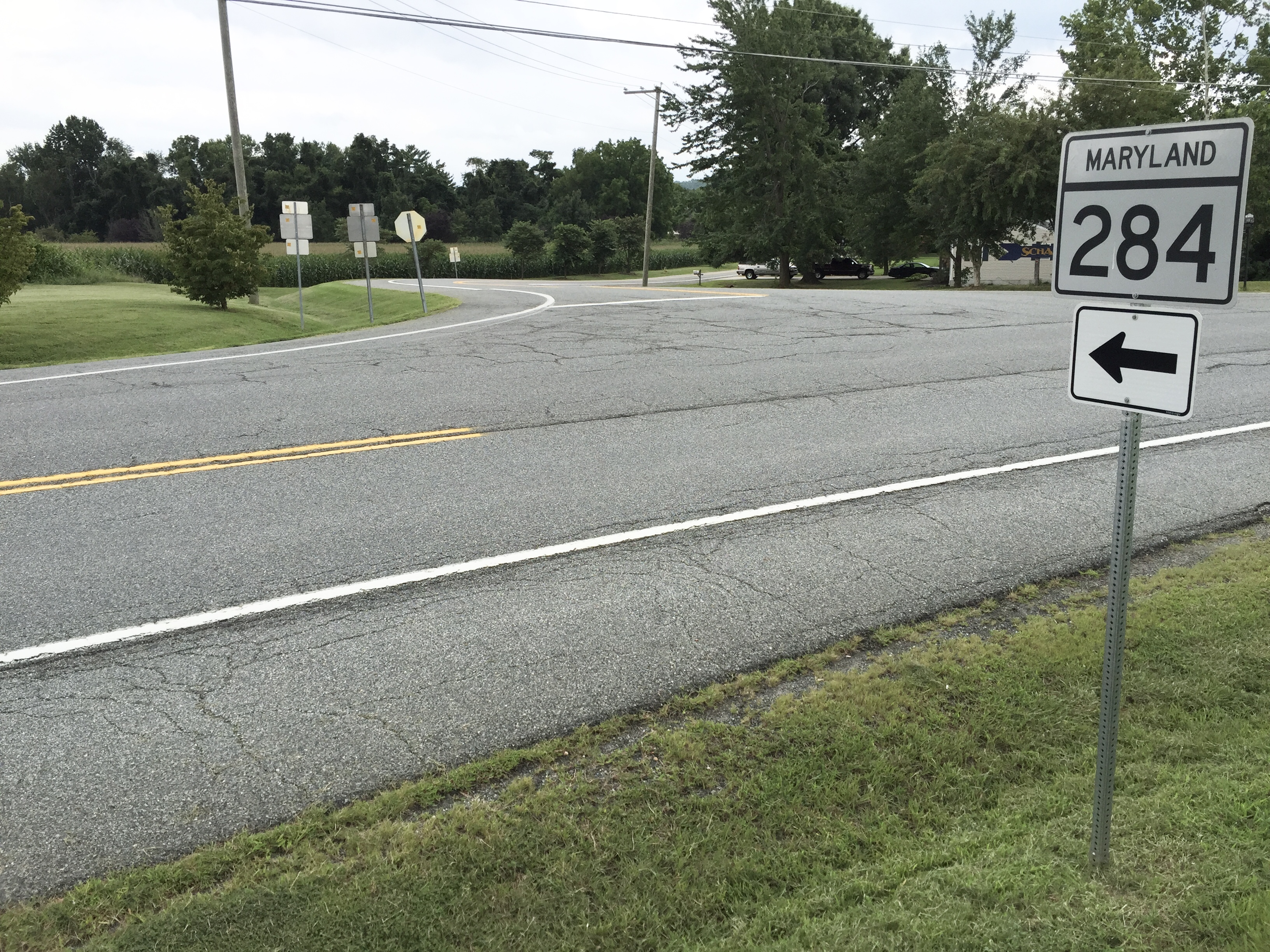
View south along MD 284 at MD 285 in Chesapeake City

Maryland Route 284 is the designation for Hemphill Street, which runs 0.25 miles (0.40 km) between two intersections with MD 285 in Chesapeake City in southern Cecil County. MD 284 heads north from MD 285 (Biddle Street) one block north of the Chesapeake & Delaware Canal in the town of Chesapeake City. Immediately after leaving the town limits, the two-lane undivided highway curves to the west and reaches its northern terminus at MD 285 (Lock Street). MD 285 heads north to a junction with MD 213 (Augustine Herman Highway).

Hemphill Street was part of the original Cecilton–Elkton highway passing through Chesapeake City that was designated for improvement by the Maryland State Roads Commission in 1909. The highway through Chesapeake City was paved as a 14-foot-wide (4.3 m) concrete road in 1915. At that time, the main highway entered Chesapeake City from the north along Hemphill Street, crossed the Chesapeake & Delaware Canal on a one-lane bridge, turned west and crossed Back Creek on a wooden bridge, turned south onto Bohemia Street in South Chesapeake City, turned west onto Third Street, and turned south onto George Street to leave the town.

In the 1920s, the U.S. Army Corps of Engineers widened, straightened, and deepened the canal. As part of their work, the agency constructed a vertical lift bridge across the canal. Between 1924 and 1926, the Maryland State Roads Commission constructed approaches to the new bridge on both sides of the expanded canal, eliminating two narrow and dangerous bridges and four right-angle turns in Chesapeake City. The new route along George Street and Lock Street, which became part of US 213 in 1927 and is now MD 285 and MD 537, entirely bypassed what is now MD 284. MD 284 was resurfaced with bituminous concrete in 1976, and its junction with MD 285 was changed from a tangent to the present orthogonal intersection in 1982.

=== References ===
Browse numbered routes
← MD 282	→ MD 285

== MD 308 ==
Maryland Route 308
- Location: Federalsburg
- Length: 0.12 mi (190 m)

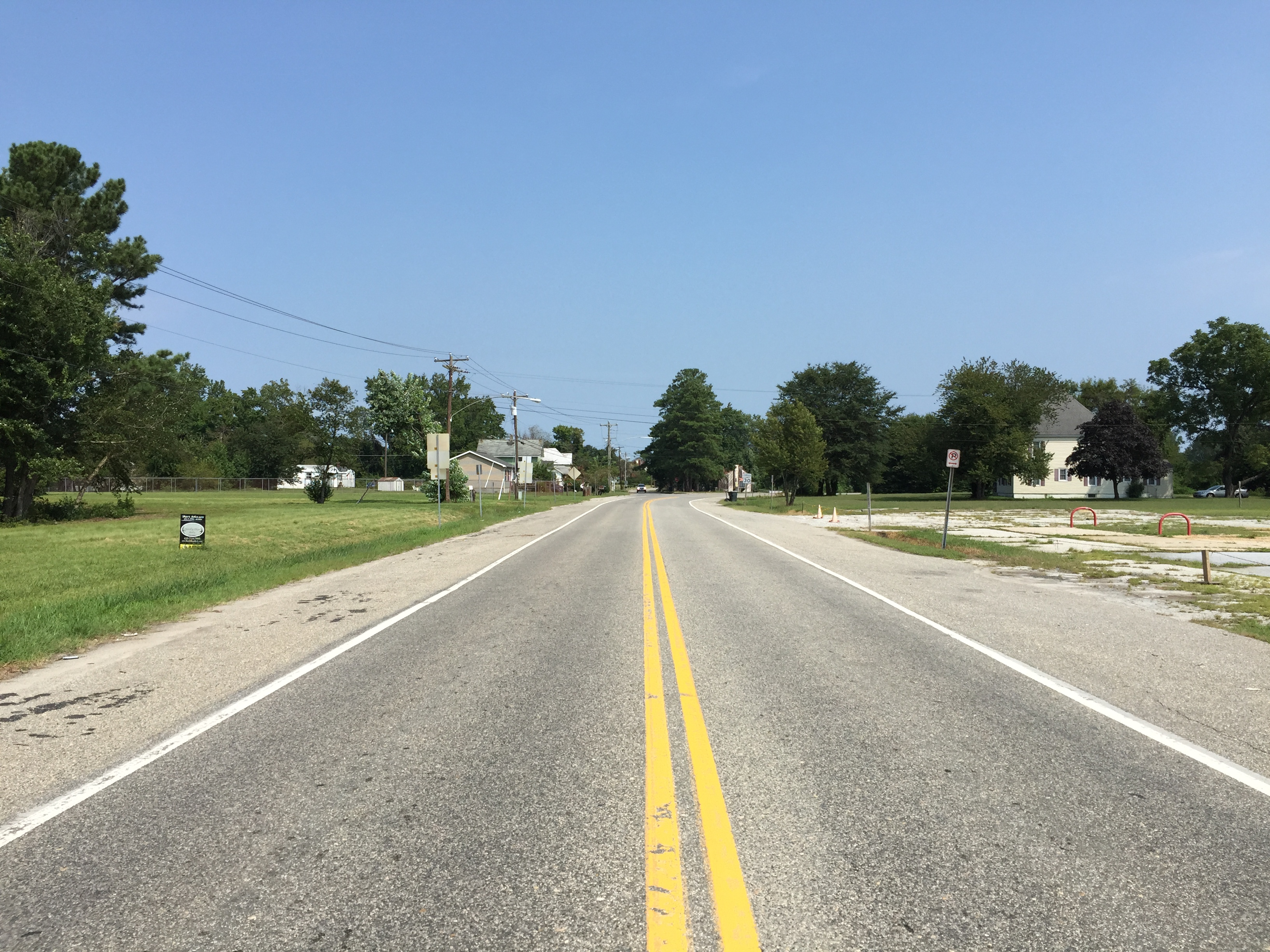
View north along MD 308 at MD 313/MD 318 in Federalsburg

Maryland Route 308 is the designation for a portion of South Main Street in Federalsburg, Caroline County running from MD 313/MD 318 north to the end of state maintenance, where South Main Street continues north as a municipal street. The route is 0.12 miles (0.19 km) long. Although not signposted, it does appear in official documents and some commercial maps.

Browse numbered routes
← MD 307	→ MD 309

== MD 324 ==
Maryland Route 324
- Location: Preston
- Length: 0.40 mi (640 m)

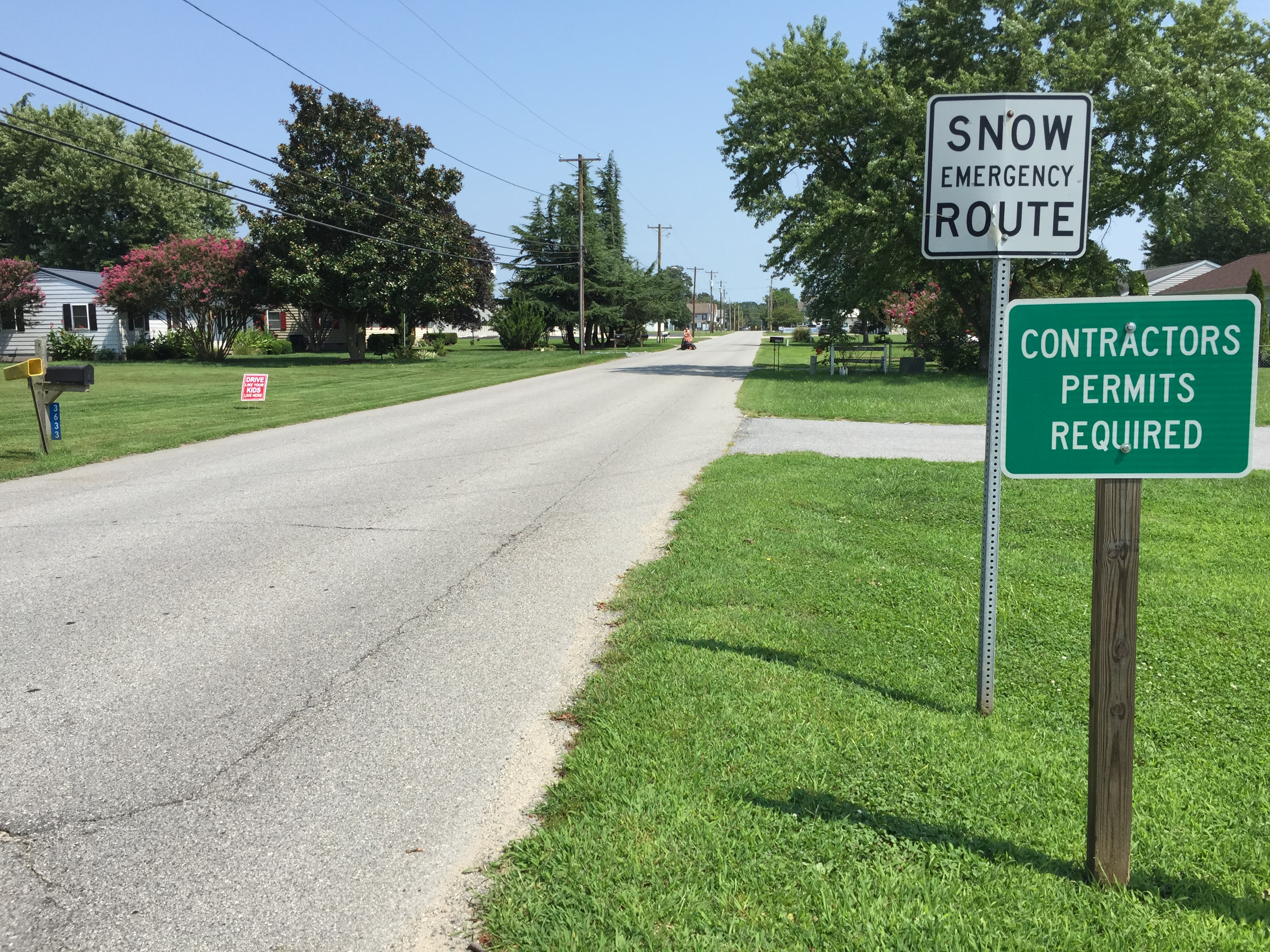
View north along MD 324 entering Preston

Maryland Route 324 is the unsigned designation for Maple Avenue, which runs for 0.40 mi (0.64 km) from MD 16/MD 331 south to the southern town limit of Preston in Caroline County, where the highway continues as county-maintained Choptank Road.

Browse numbered routes
← MD 322	→ MD 327

== MD 327 ==
Maryland Route 327
- Location: Perryville
- Length: 0.51 mi (820 m)
- Existed: 1968–present

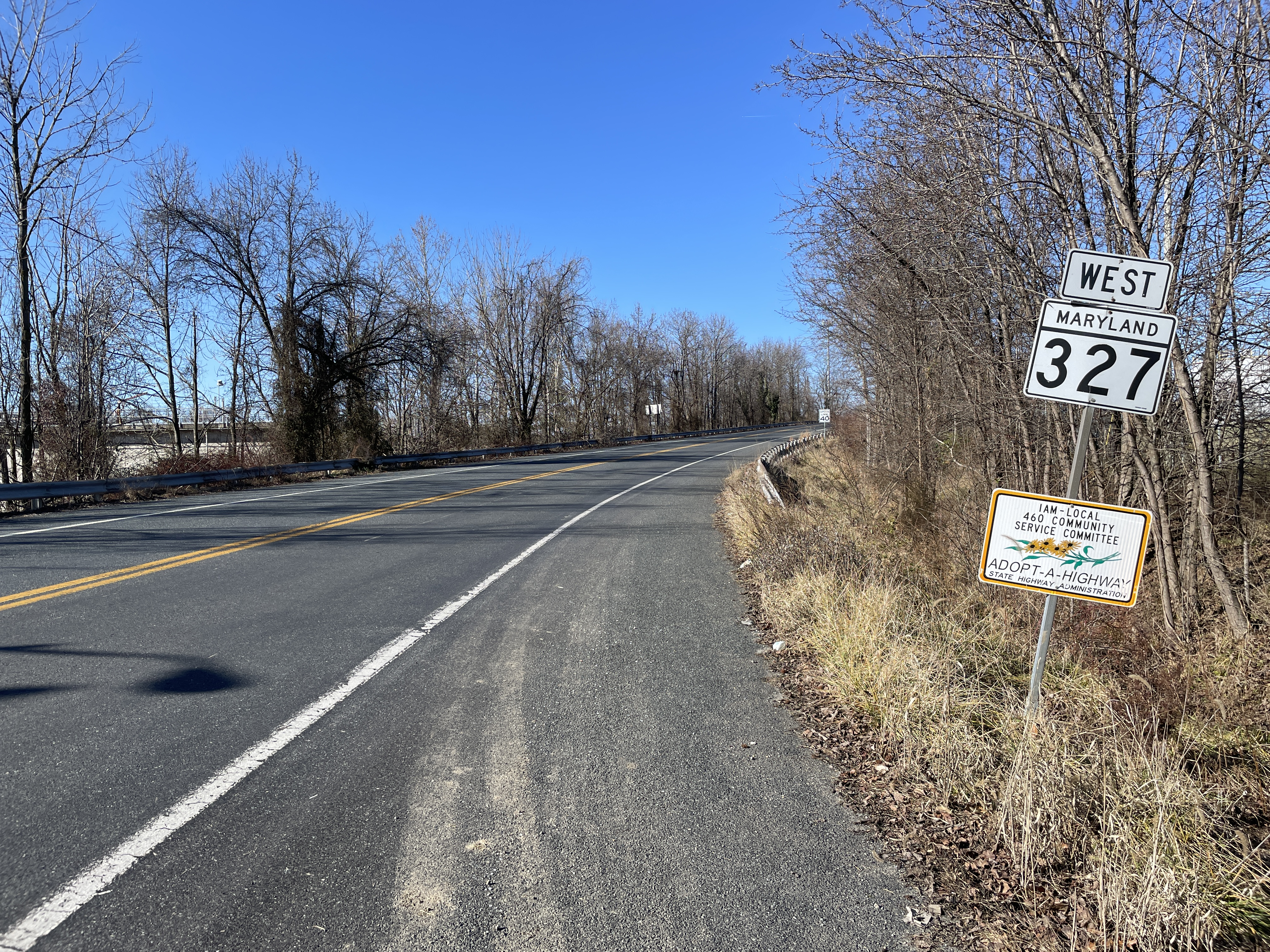
View west along MD 327 at Marion Tapp Parkway in Perryville

Maryland Route 327, which is known as Ikea Way, runs 0.51 miles (0.82 km) from MD 7 east to a dead end within the town of Perryville in southwestern Cecil County. MD 327 begins at an intersection with MD 7 (Broad Street) on the eastern edge of the town of Perryville. The state highway heads southeast as a two-lane undivided road and crosses over Amtrak's Northeast Corridor railroad line. MD 327 comes to an intersection with Marion Tapp Parkway, which leads southwest to the entrance of the adjacent Perryville Wastewater Treatment Plant and to Perryville Community Park located at the Perry Point promontory east of the Perry Point VA Medical Center property. From here, the route passes south of an IKEA distribution center before it reaches a dead end.

In a March 8, 1967, agreement, the Maryland State Roads Commission agreed to transfer maintenance of part of MD 7 and all of MD 271 to the town of Perryville upon the completion of a new highway and bridge from MD 7 across the Pennsylvania Railroad (now Amtrak) to serve the peninsula south of the railroad between Mill Creek and Furnace Bay. The new highway, designated MD 327, was constructed in 1968, the same year Firestone Plastics opened a chemical plant on the present site of the IKEA distribution center. The state highway had no name as of 1999; it was designated Firestone Road in 2001 and Ikea Way in 2004 shortly after the opening of the IKEA distribution center. In 2018, MD 327 was extended east from Marion Tapp Parkway to a dead end after it was determined that stretch of Ikea Way was maintained by the state.

=== References ===
Browse numbered routes
← MD 324	→ MD 328

== MD 334 ==
Maryland Route 334
- Location: Easton
- Length: 0.61 mi (980 m)

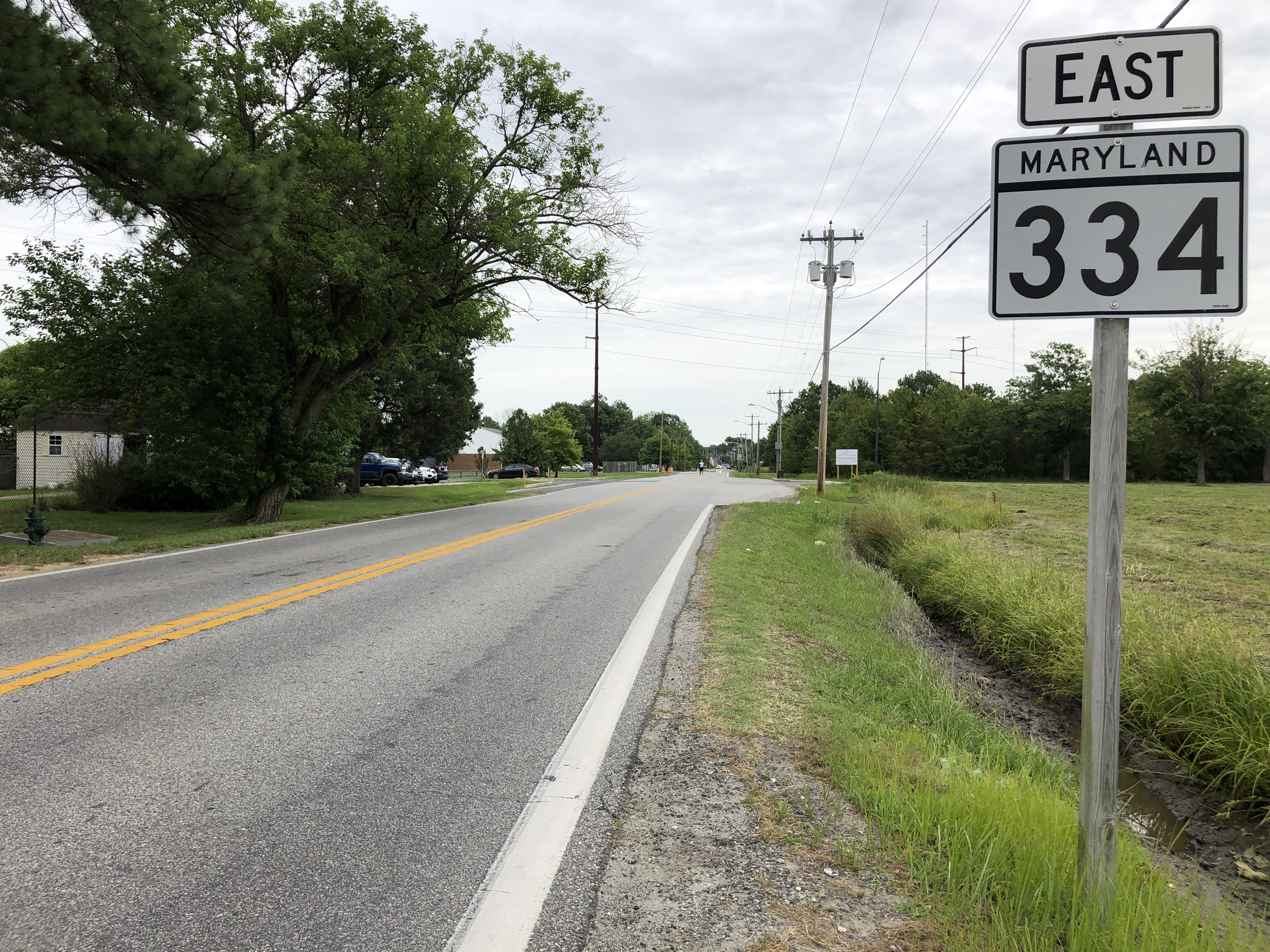
View east along MD 334 at MD 322 in Easton

Maryland Route 334 is a state highway in Talbot County that runs along two-lane undivided Port Street from MD 322 on the western edge of the town of Easton, eastward to Washington Street. MD 334 starts in the west at the intersection with MD 322 (Easton Parkway), where Port Street continues west as a county road toward a dead end along the Tred Avon River. It passes through a somewhat rural side of the town, changing quickly to a residential corridor. East of the Clay Street intersection, the road becomes municipally maintained. The route comes to its eastern terminus at Washington Street.

Browse numbered routes
← MD 333	→ MD 335

== MD 368 ==
Maryland Route 368
- Location: Bishopville
- Length: 0.28 mi (450 m)

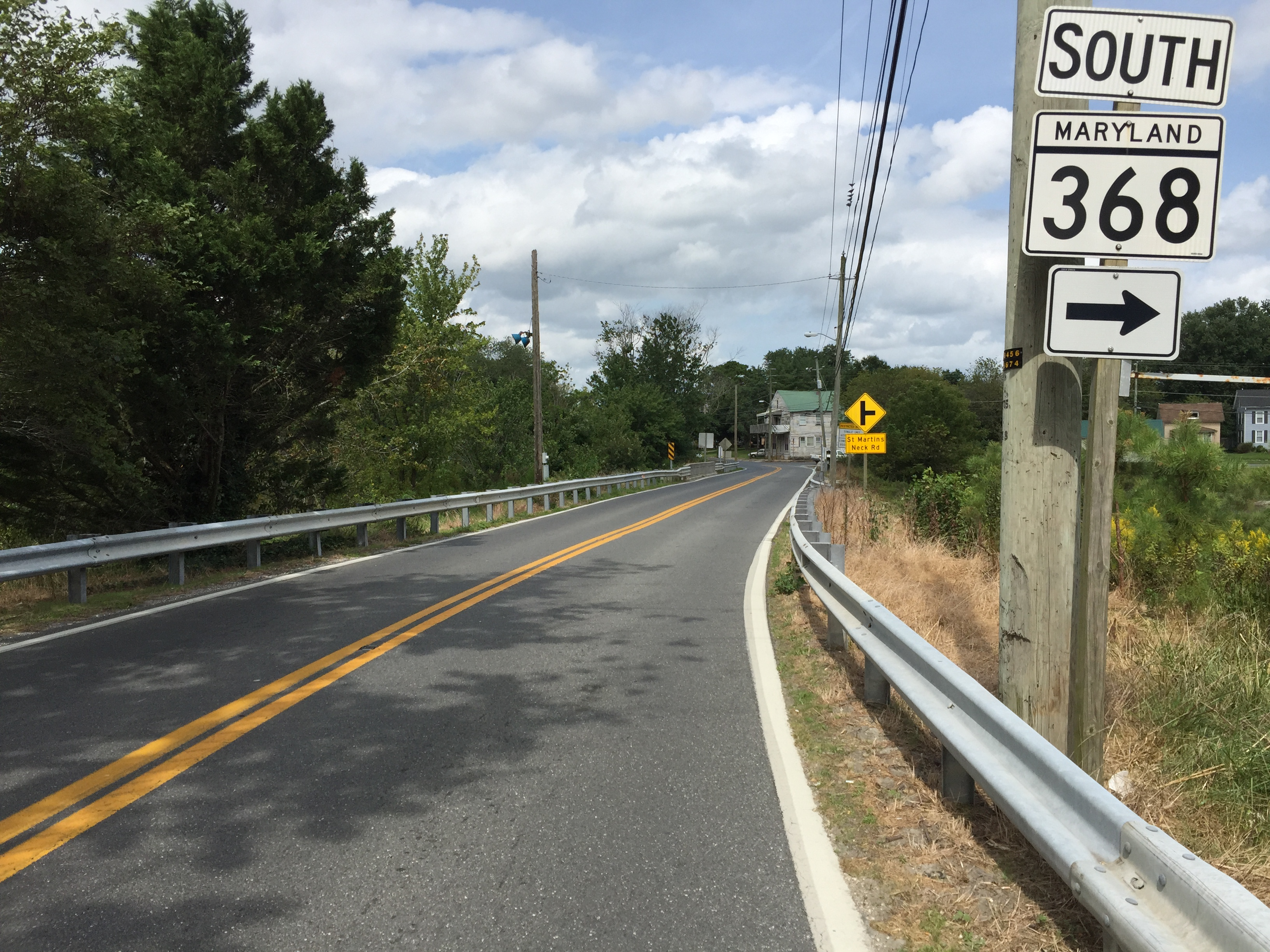
Sign for MD 368 along eastbound MD 367 in Bishopville

Maryland Route 368 is the designation for St. Martins Neck Road, a 0.28 mi (0.45 km) spur that runs from the beginning of state maintenance north to MD 367 in Bishopville. St. Martins Neck Road continues southeast as a county highway to Isle of Wight, where it has an at-grade intersection with MD 90 (Ocean City Expressway). MD 368 originally also included present day MD 568 and MD 367 between the two roads; MD 368 was shortened to its present length in 1950.

Browse numbered routes
← MD 367	→ I-370

== MD 375 ==
Maryland Route 375
- Location: Berlin
- Length: 0.06 mi (97 m)

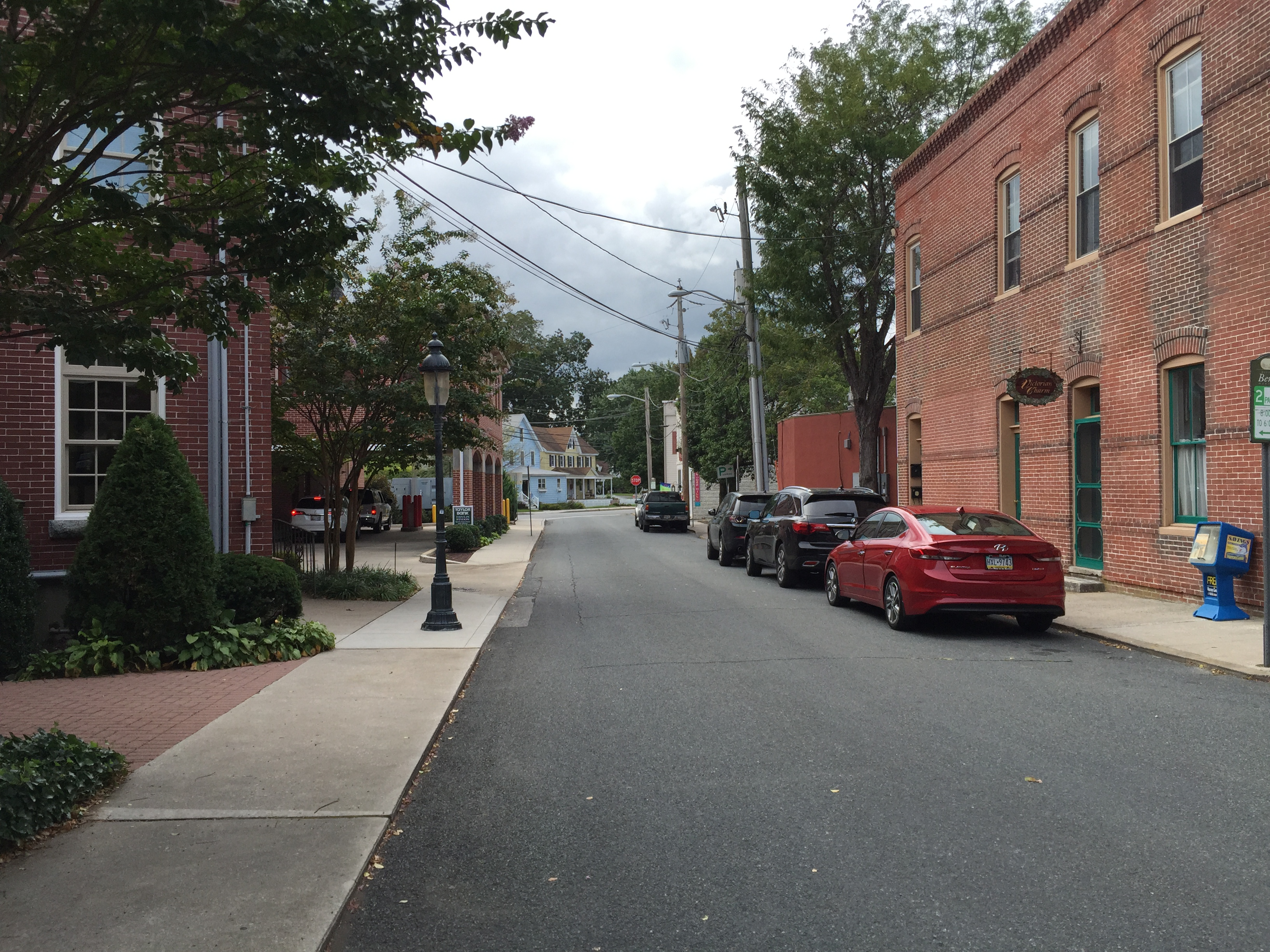
MD 375 westbound at MD 818 in downtown Berlin

Maryland Route 375 is the unsigned designation for Commerce Street, a 0.06 mi (0.097 km) street that runs one-way west (officially north) from MD 818 (Main Street) to MD 374 (Broad Street) within downtown Berlin.

Browse numbered routes
← MD 374	→ MD 376

== MD 377 ==
Maryland Route 377
- Location: Berlin
- Length: 0.78 mi (1,260 m)

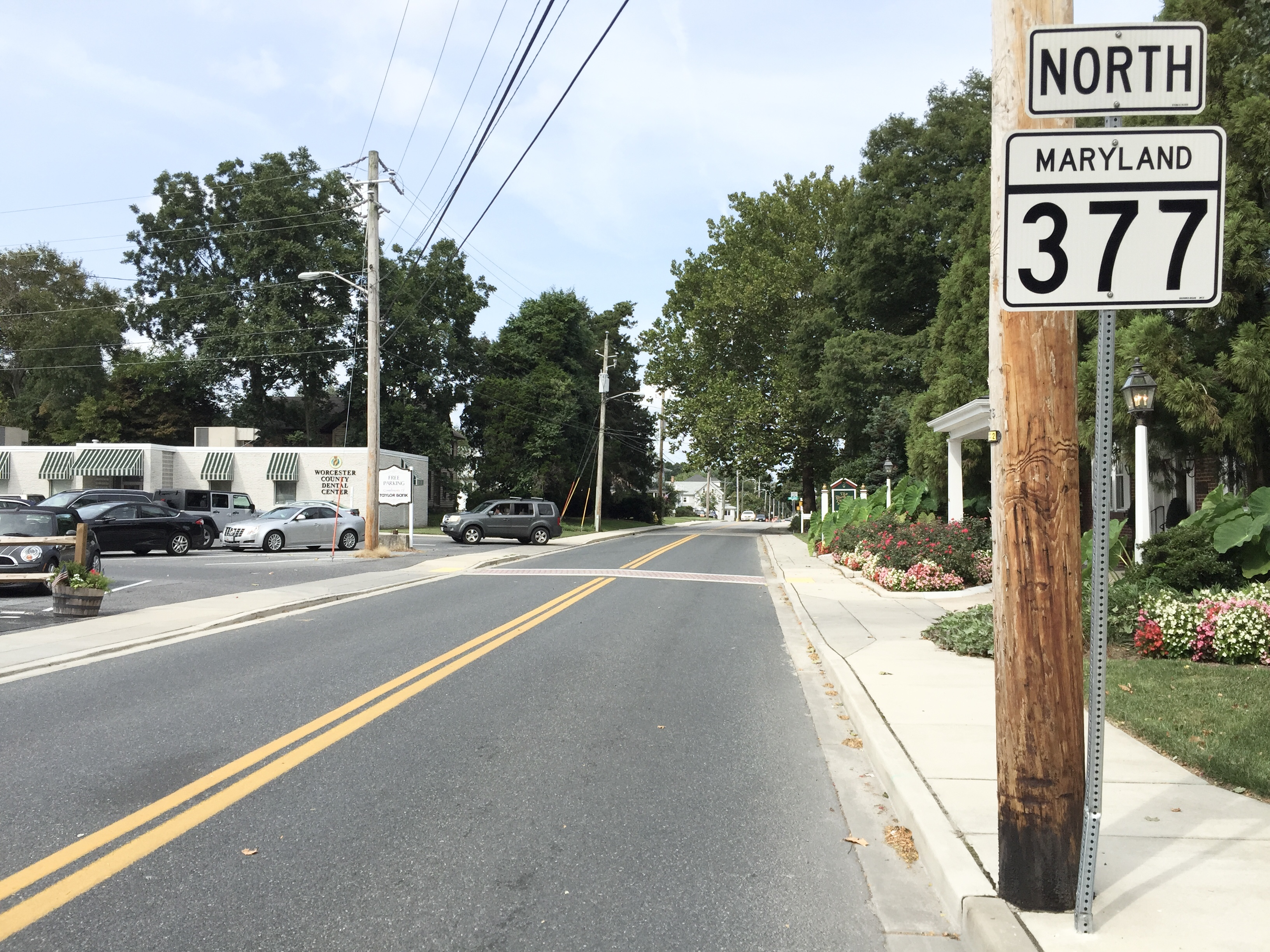
View north along MD 377 in downtown Berlin

Maryland Route 377 is the designation for Williams Street, which runs 0.78 mi (1.26 km) from MD 376 in the Berlin Commercial District north to MD 346 (Old Ocean City Boulevard) just west of US 113 within Berlin.

Browse numbered routes
← MD 376	→ MD 378

== MD 384 ==
Maryland Route 384
- Location: Silver Spring
- Length: 0.53 mi (850 m)

Maryland Route 384 runs 0.53 mi (0.85 km) from MD 390 east to US 29 and MD 97 in Silver Spring, providing access to the Silver Spring station of the Washington Metro.

== MD 393 ==
Maryland Route 393
- Location: Annapolis and Parole
- Length: 0.63 mi (1,010 m)

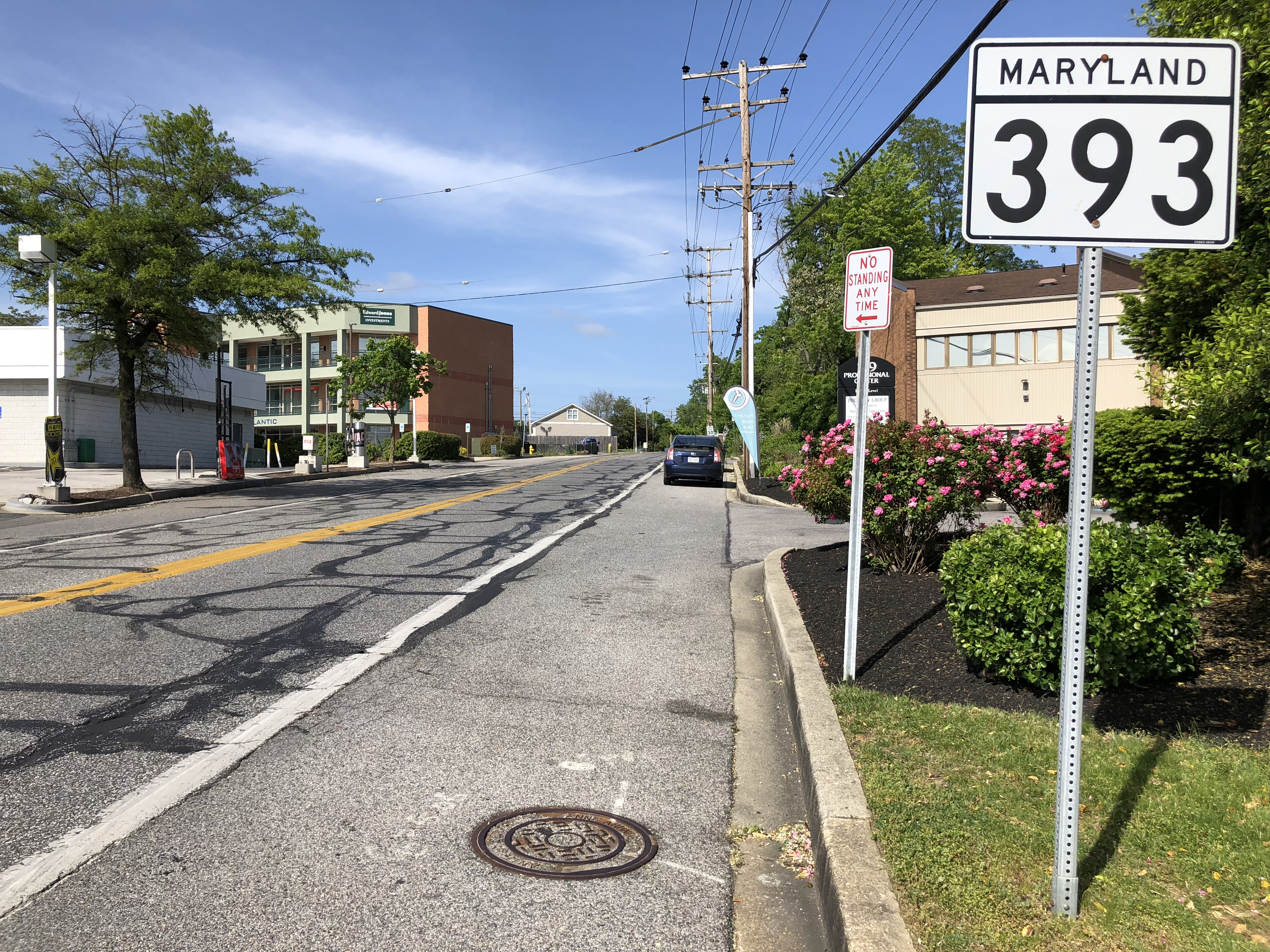
View north along MD 393 at MD 2 in Annapolis

Maryland Route 393 (Old Solomons Island Road) is an old alignment of Maryland Route 2 through Annapolis and Parole in Anne Arundel County. Its alignment runs from MD 2 north of MD 665 northerly to MD 450. It is 0.63 miles (1.01 km) long.

Browse numbered routes
← MD 392	→ I-395

== MD 430 ==
Maryland Route 430
- Location: College Park
- Length: 0.49 mi (790 m)

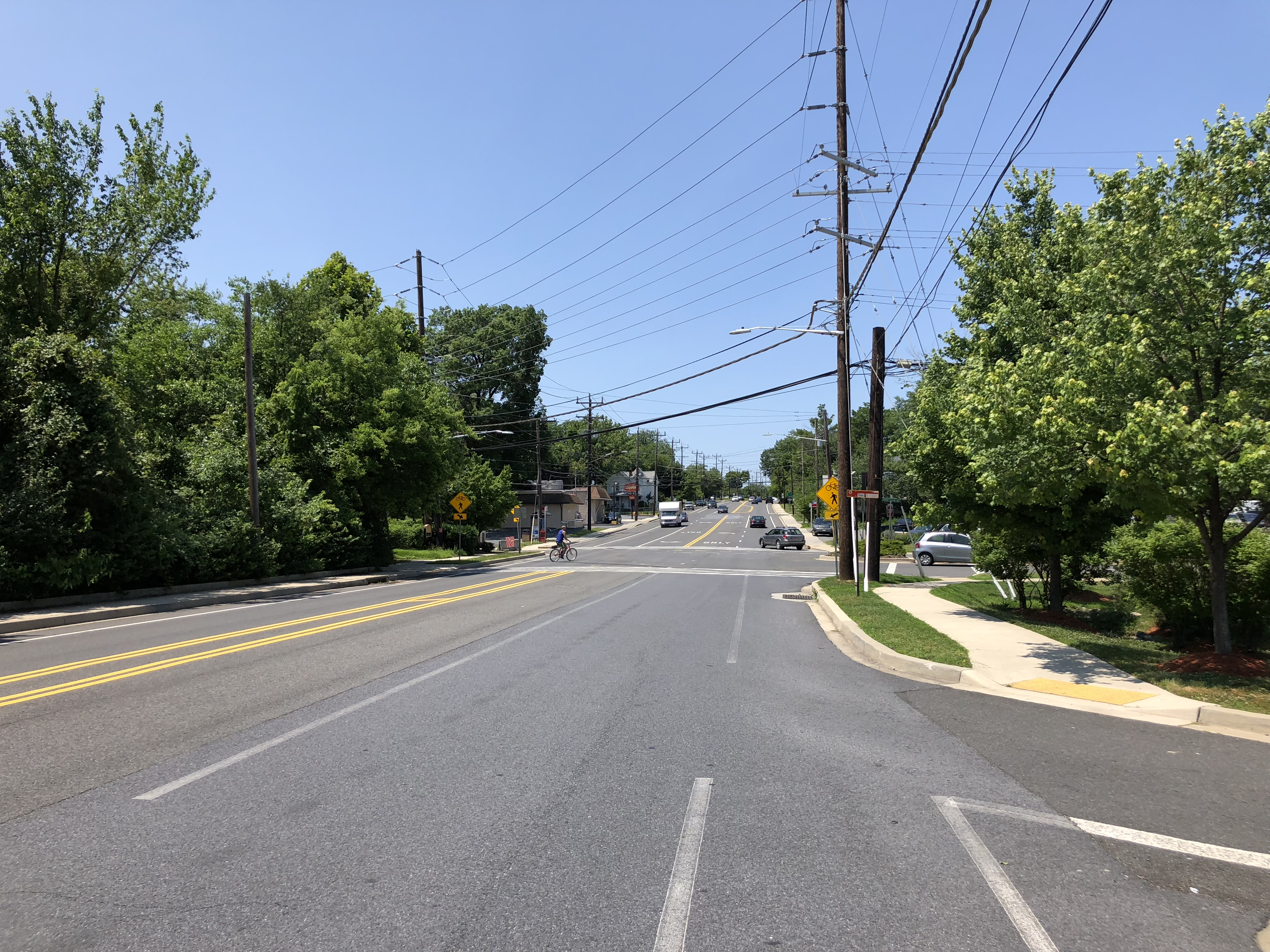
View west along MD 430 at MD 193 in College Park

Maryland Route 430 is the unsigned designation for Greenbelt Road, which runs 0.49 mi (0.79 km) from US 1 east to MD 193 within College Park. MD 430 serves to complete movements missing from the US 1-MD 193 interchange to the north of MD 430's western terminus.

Browse numbered routes
← MD 425	→ MD 431

== MD 432 ==
Maryland Route 432
- Location: Columbia
- Length: 0.25 mi (400 m)

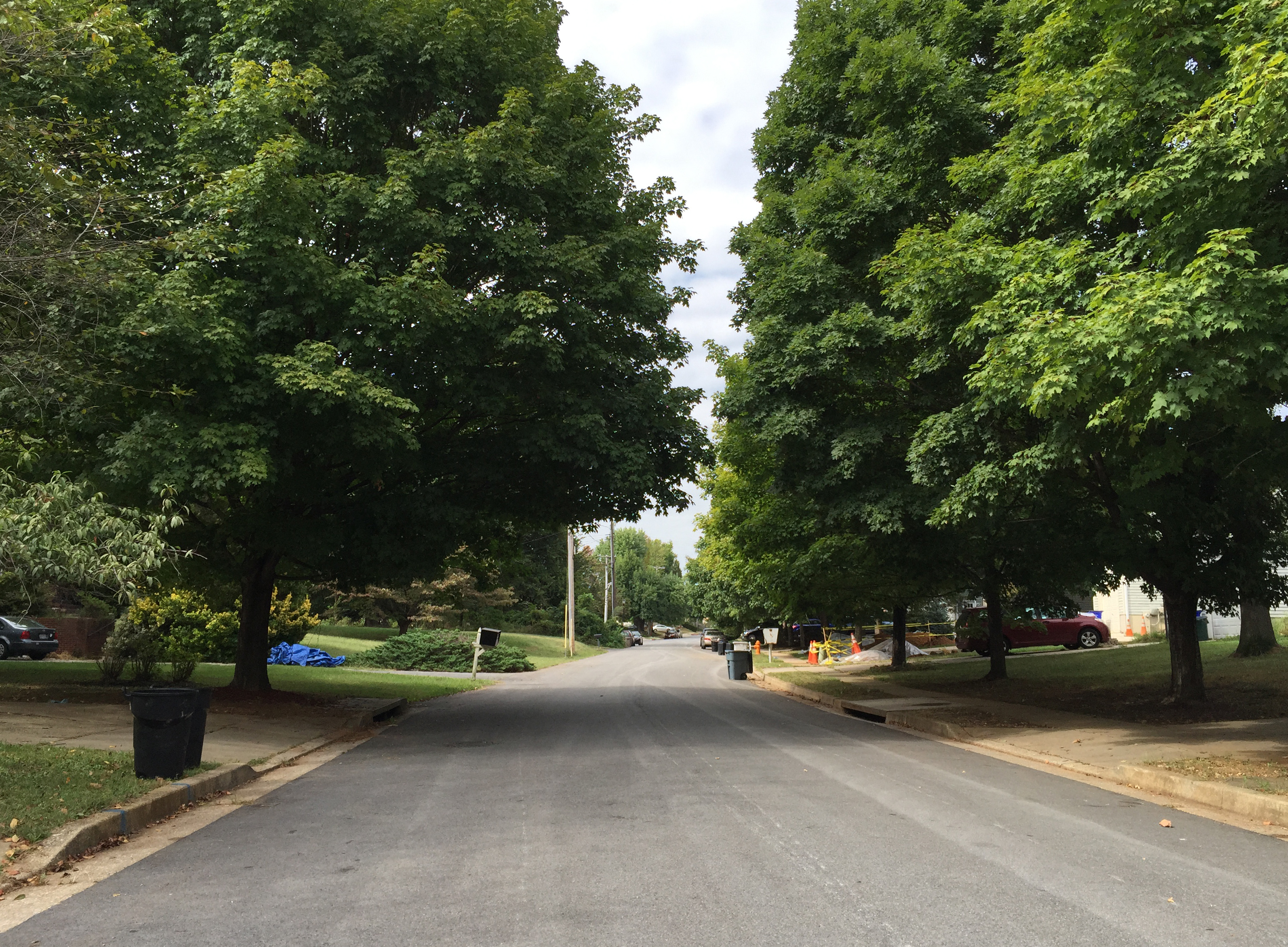
View west along MD 432 in Columbia

Maryland Route 432 is the unsigned designation for Glen Oaks Lane, which runs 0.25 mi (0.40 km) from the intersection of Guilford Road and Oakland Mills Road east to a cul-de-sac adjacent to I-95's interchange with MD 32 (Exit 38) in Columbia.

Browse numbered routes
← MD 431	→ MD 433

== MD 449 ==
Maryland Route 449
- Location: Locust Grove
- Length: 0.07 mi (110 m)
- Existed: 1969–present

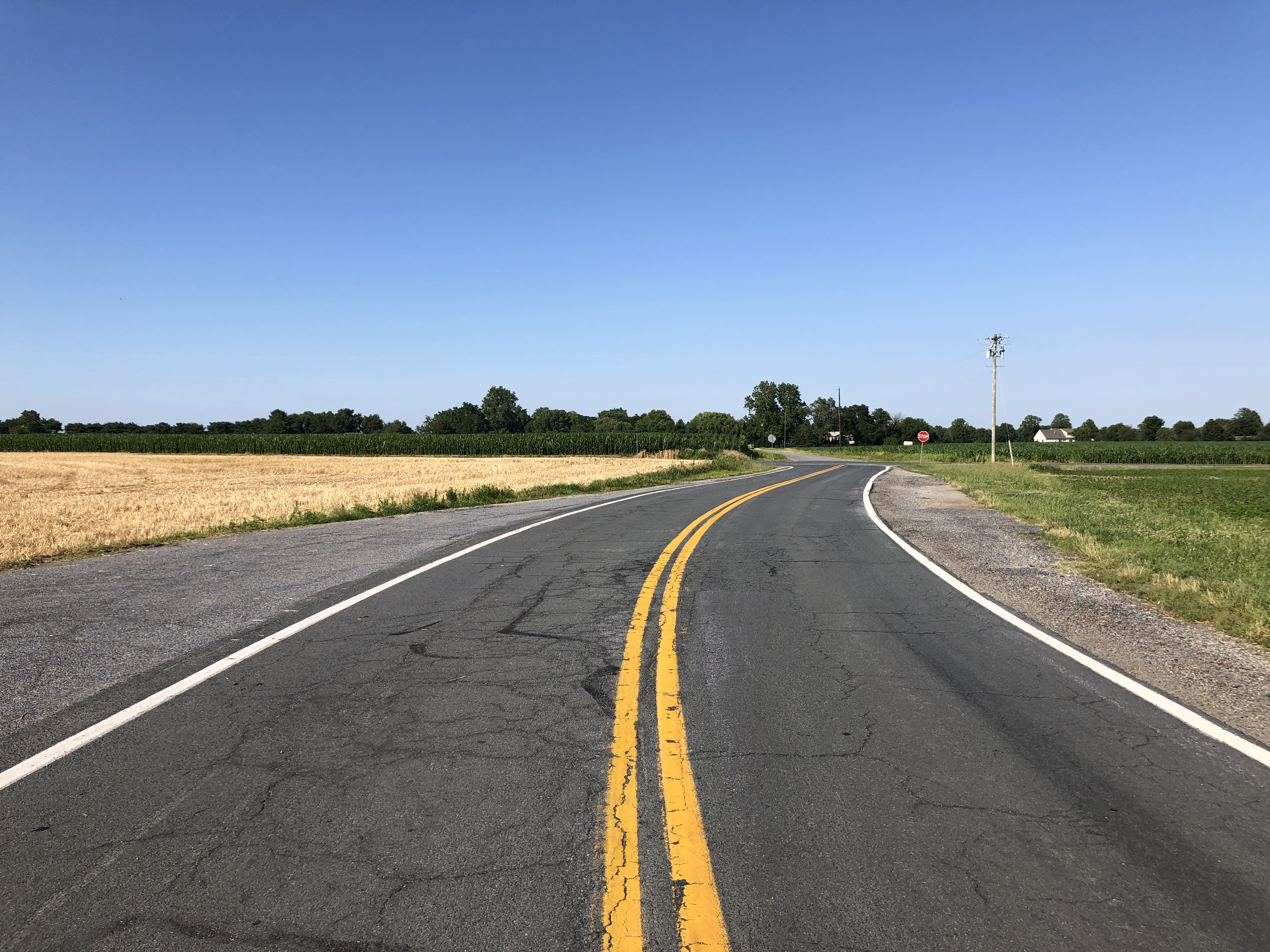
MD 449 at MD 213 in Locust Grove

Maryland Route 449 is the unsigned designation for the 0.07-mile-long (0.11 km) section of Shallcross Wharf Road from MD 213 east to MD 444 near Locust Grove in northern Kent County. The course of MD 449 and Shallcross Wharf Road northeast to Old Locust Grove Road were part of the original Chestertown–Galena highway proposed for improvement as a state road in 1909. This stretch was constructed as a 14-foot-wide (4.3 m) macadam road in 1912. After US 213's bypass of Locust Grove was built in 1950 and 1951, the old path of US 213 through Locust Grove—Shallcross Wharf Road between the western end of the bypass and the center of Locust Grove, and Old Locust Grove Road between the center of Locust Grove and the eastern end of the bypass—became part of MD 444, with what is now MD 449 being a spur of the main route. After MD 444's present course west of Locust Grove was constructed in 1968, Old Locust Grove Road became MD 447, and the 0.32-mile-long (0.51 km) portion of Shallcross Wharf Road between US 213 and the new MD 447 became MD 449. MD 449 was resurfaced with bituminous concrete in 1984. Three years later, MD 449 was transferred from state to county maintenance through a December 1, 1987, road transfer agreement. However, the portion of MD 449 between MD 213 and MD 444 was returned to state control to be destroyed, but the highway remained in use. Thus, in 1997, MD 449 was returned to the inventory of the state highway system.

=== References ===
Browse numbered routes
← MD 446	→ MD 450

== MD 460 ==
Maryland Route 460
- Location: Crisfield
- Length: 0.78 mi (1,260 m)

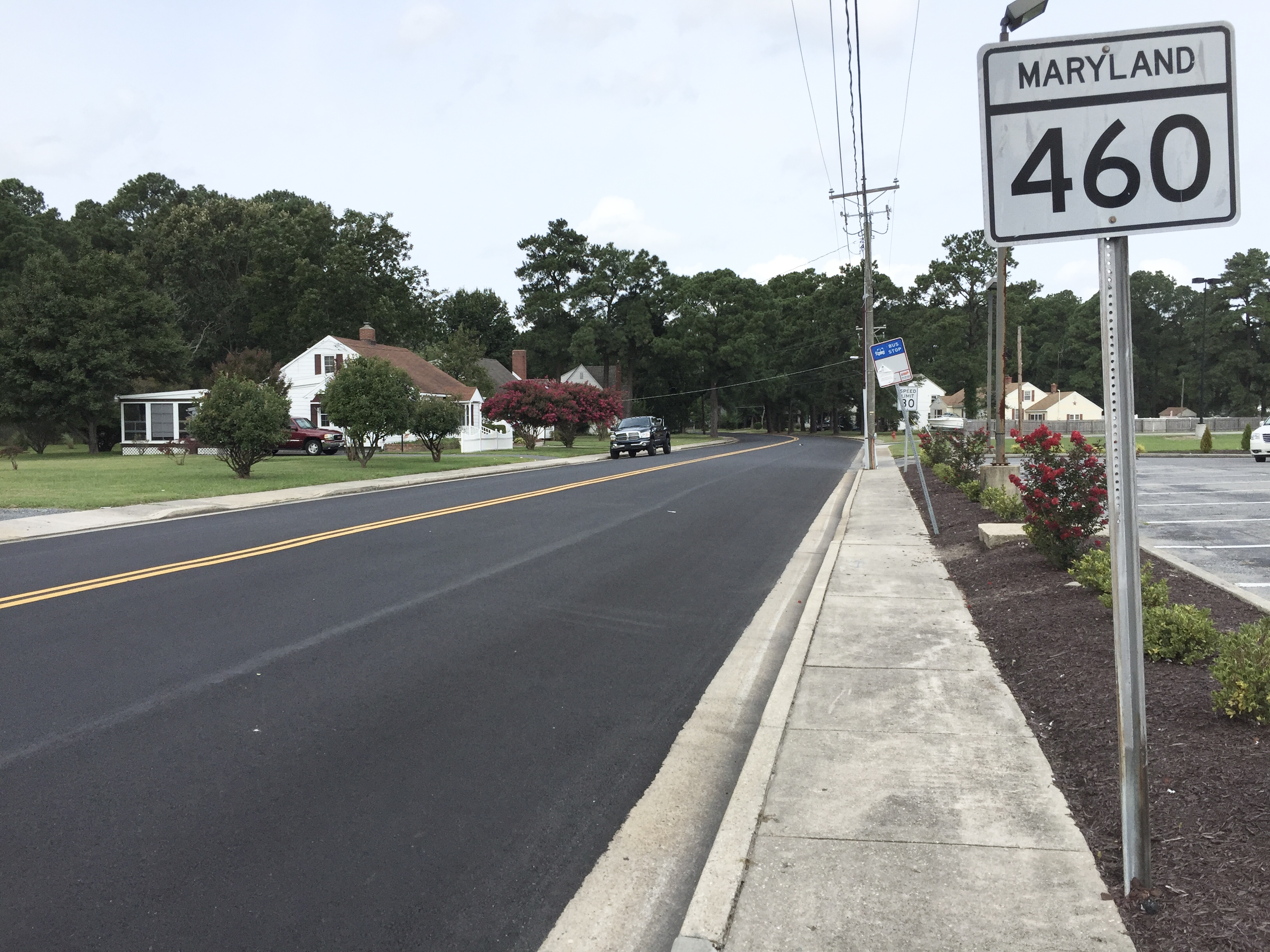
View north along MD 460 at MD 413 in Crisfield

Maryland Route 460, which is known as Hall Highway, runs 0.78 miles (1.26 km) from McCready Memorial Hospital east to MD 413 within Crisfield in southwestern Somerset County. The highway begins just north of the McCready Memorial Hospital property on a peninsula between Daugherty Creek and the Little Annemessex River. The roadway continues north as county-maintained Byrd Road. MD 460 heads south, entering the city limits of Crisfield and passing through the hospital grounds, where the highway is flanked by perpendicular parking spaces. The state highway turns east and crosses the Little Annemessex River, then passes through a residential neighborhood where the highway intersects Wynfall Avenue, which provides full access to MD 413. MD 460 reaches its eastern terminus at southbound MD 413 (Maryland Avenue). There is no direct access to northbound MD 413 (Richardson Avenue). McCready Memorial Hospital was founded in 1923 as a memorial to Edward W. McCready, a cork industry scion and Crisfield native who was killed in a train–automobile collision on the Crisfield–Westover road in 1919. MD 460 was constructed around 1933 to provide a more direct connection between the hospital and the populated areas of Crisfield.

Browse numbered routes
← MD 459	→ MD 462

== MD 485 ==
Maryland Route 485
- Location: Hillsboro
- Length: 0.65 mi (1,050 m)

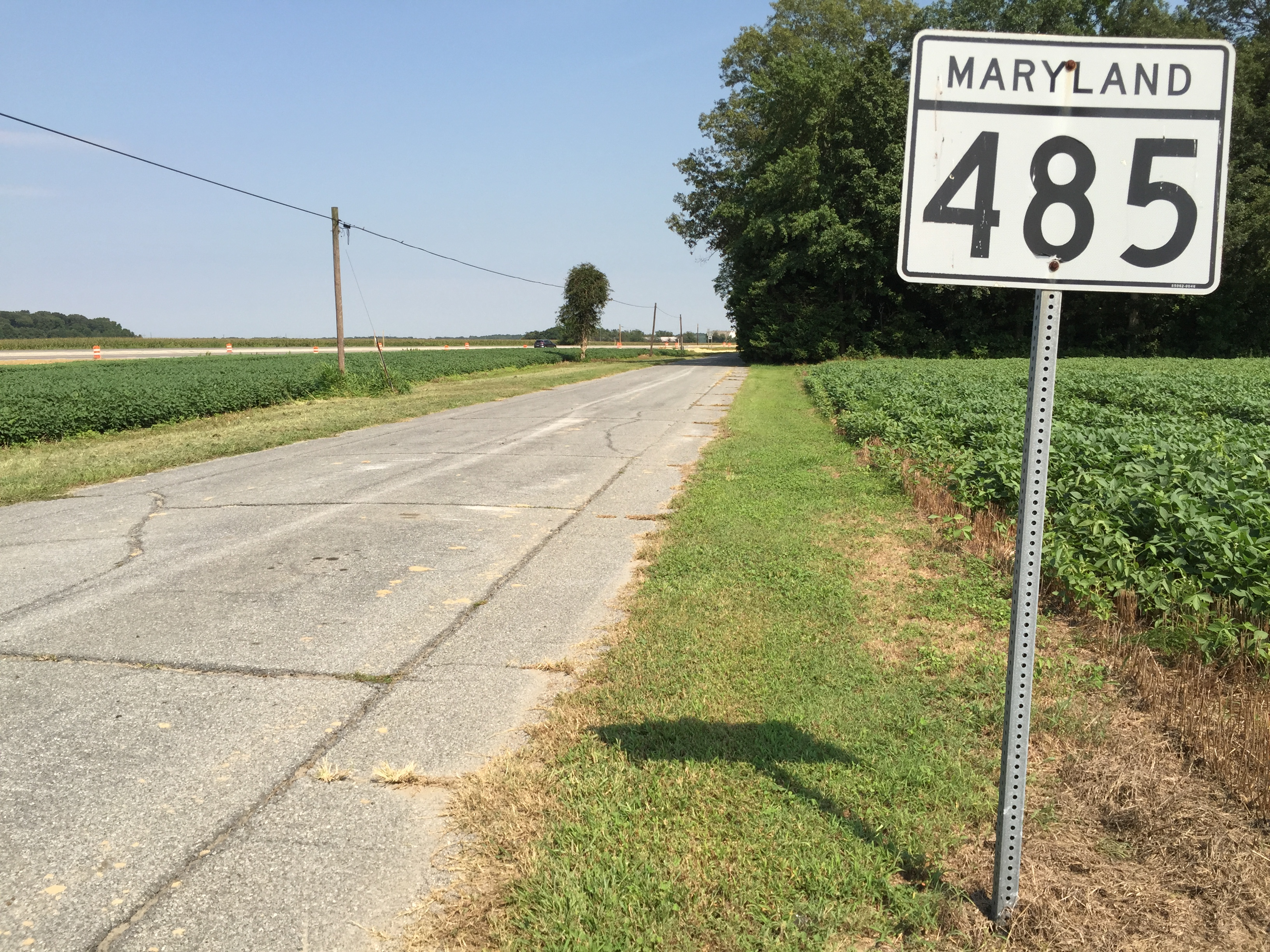
MD 485A (signed as MD 485) in Hillsboro

Maryland Route 485 is the unsigned designation for Saathoff Road, an old alignment of MD 404 that runs 0.65 mi (1.05 km) between two intersections with MD 404 east of Hillsboro.

- MD 485A is the designation for Shady Oak Lane, a 0.15 mi (0.24 km) stub from MD 485 just west of MD 485's eastern terminus that is part of the old alignment of MD 404. MD 485A is signed as MD 485.

Browse numbered routes
← MD 482	→ MD 488

== MD 490 ==
Maryland Route 490
- Location: Havre de Grace
- Length: 0.31 mi (500 m)
- Tourist routes: Lower Susquehanna Scenic Byway

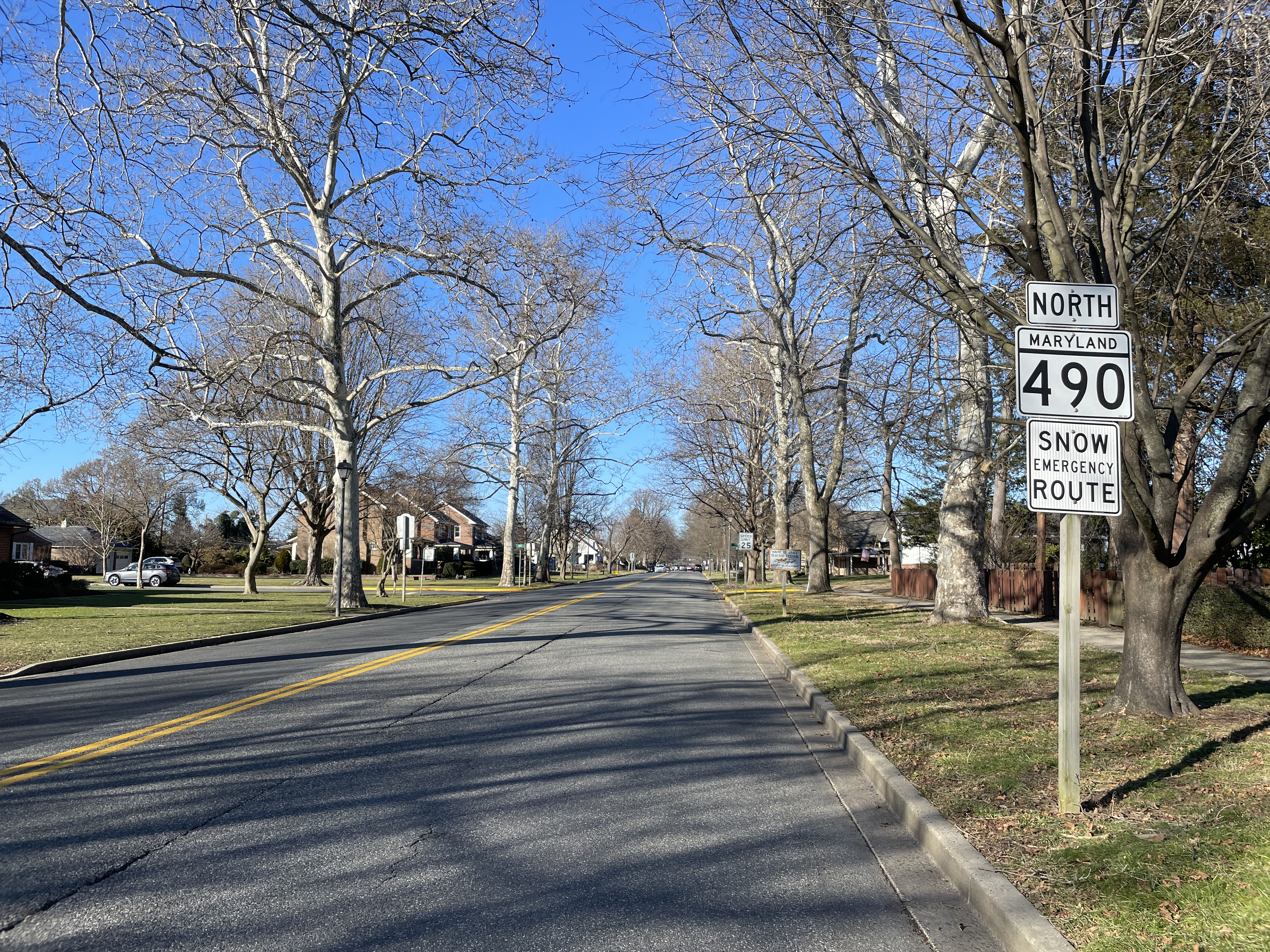
View north from the south end of MD 490 at Commerce Street in Havre de Grace

Maryland Route 490 is the signed designation for a 0.31-mile (0.50 km) section of Union Avenue from Commerce Street north to MD 7, which turns north from Revolution Street onto Union Avenue at MD 490's northern terminus.

Browse numbered routes
← MD 489	→ MD 491

== MD 518 ==
Maryland Route 518
- Location: Queen Anne
- Length: 0.06 mi (97 m)

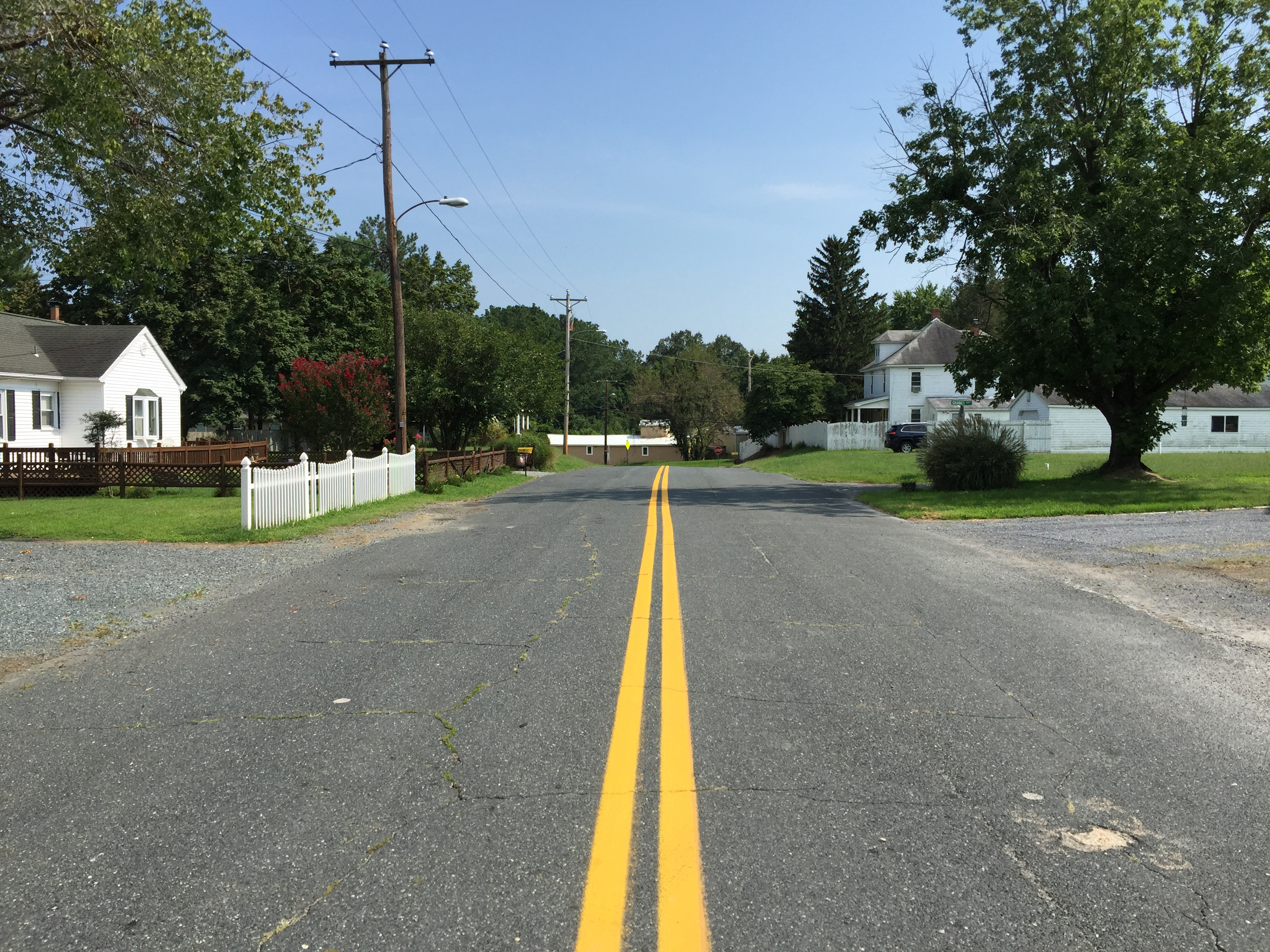
MD 518 in Queen Anne

Maryland Route 518 is the unsigned designation for First Street in the town of Queen Anne, Talbot County from Maryland Route 404 Alternate to the Queen Anne's County line. The route is 0.06 miles (0.097 km) long.

Browse numbered routes
← MD 514	→ MD 520

== MD 524 ==
Maryland Route 524
- Location: Huntingtown
- Length: 0.76 mi (1,220 m)

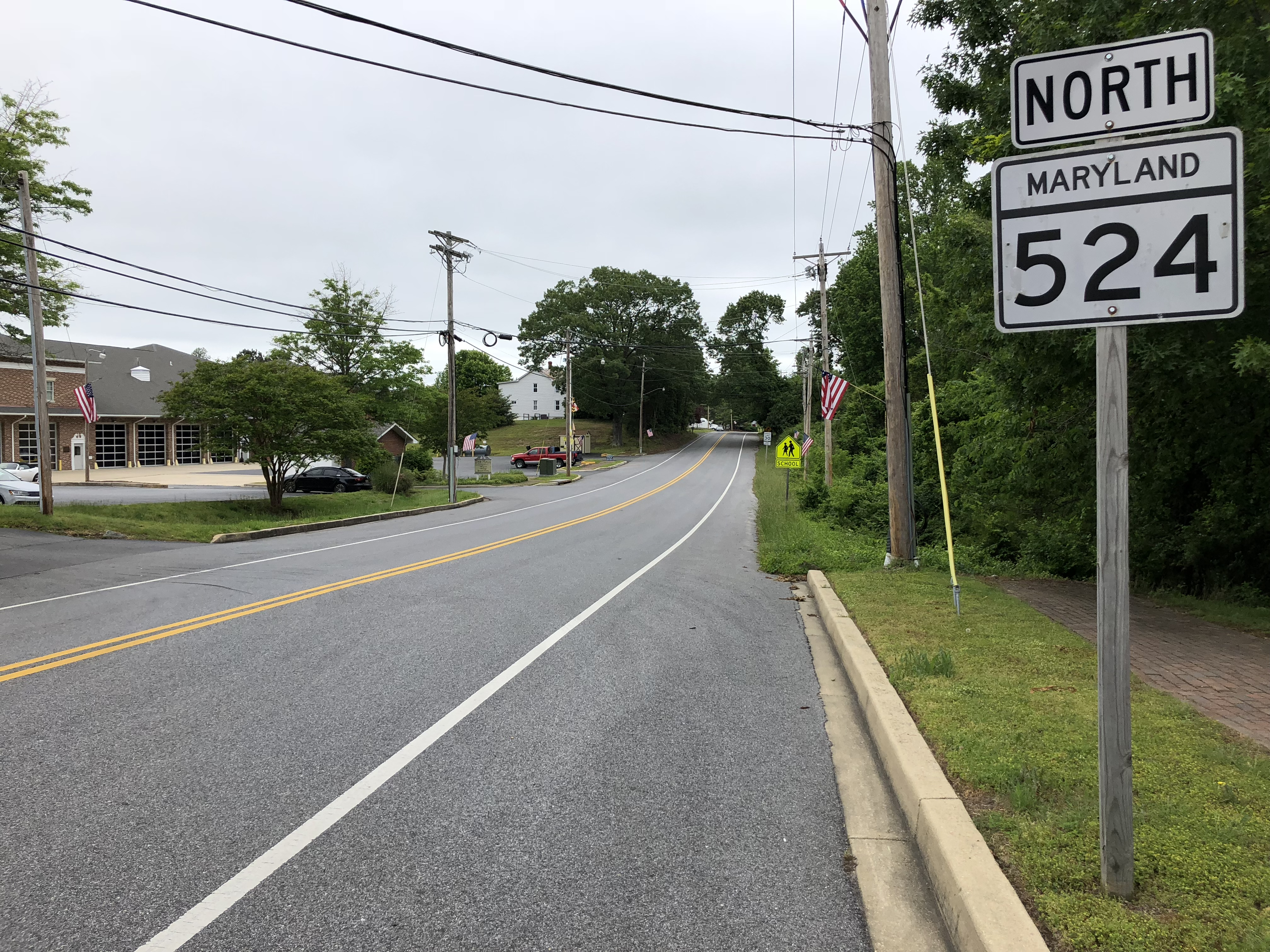
View north along MD 524 at MD 521 in Huntingtown

Maryland Route 524 is the designation for a former alignment of MD 2 looping to the west of MD 2/MD 4 in Huntingtown, Calvert County; it carries the name of Old Town Road and travels for 0.76 miles (1.22 km). It intersects the eastern terminus of MD 521.

Browse numbered routes
← US 522	→ MD 526

== MD 526 ==
Maryland Route 526
- Location: Baltimore County
- Length: 0.13 mi (210 m)
- Existed: 2014–present

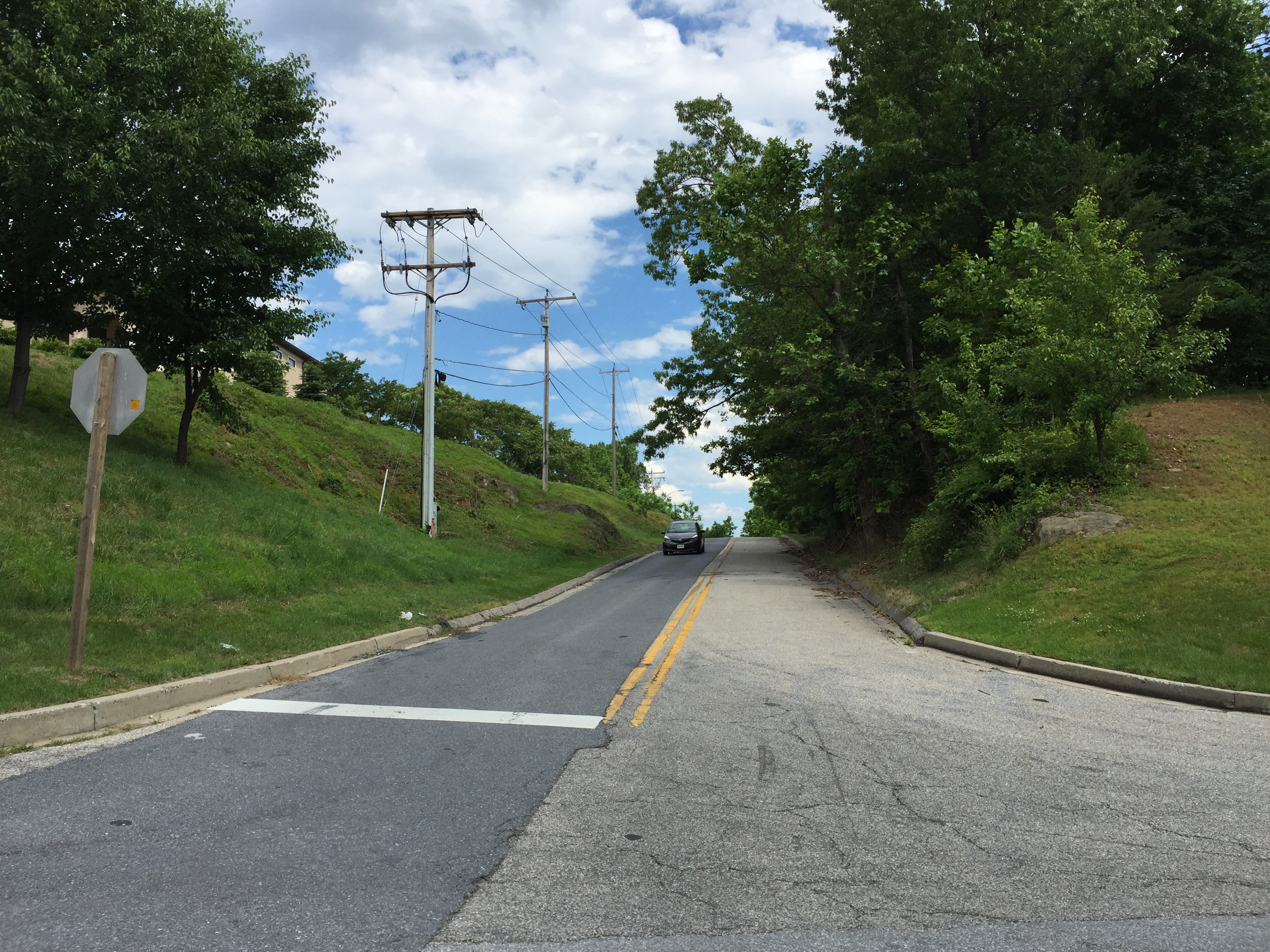
View east at the west end of MD 526 at MD 140 northwest of Reisterstown

Maryland Route 526A is the unsigned designation for an unnamed road running 0.13 miles (0.21 km) from MD 140 northeast to Woodfield Court northwest of Reisterstown, Baltimore County. The route was designated in 2014.

Browse numbered routes
← MD 524	→ MD 528

== MD 535 ==
Maryland Route 535
- Location: Camp Springs
- Length: 0.16 mi (260 m)

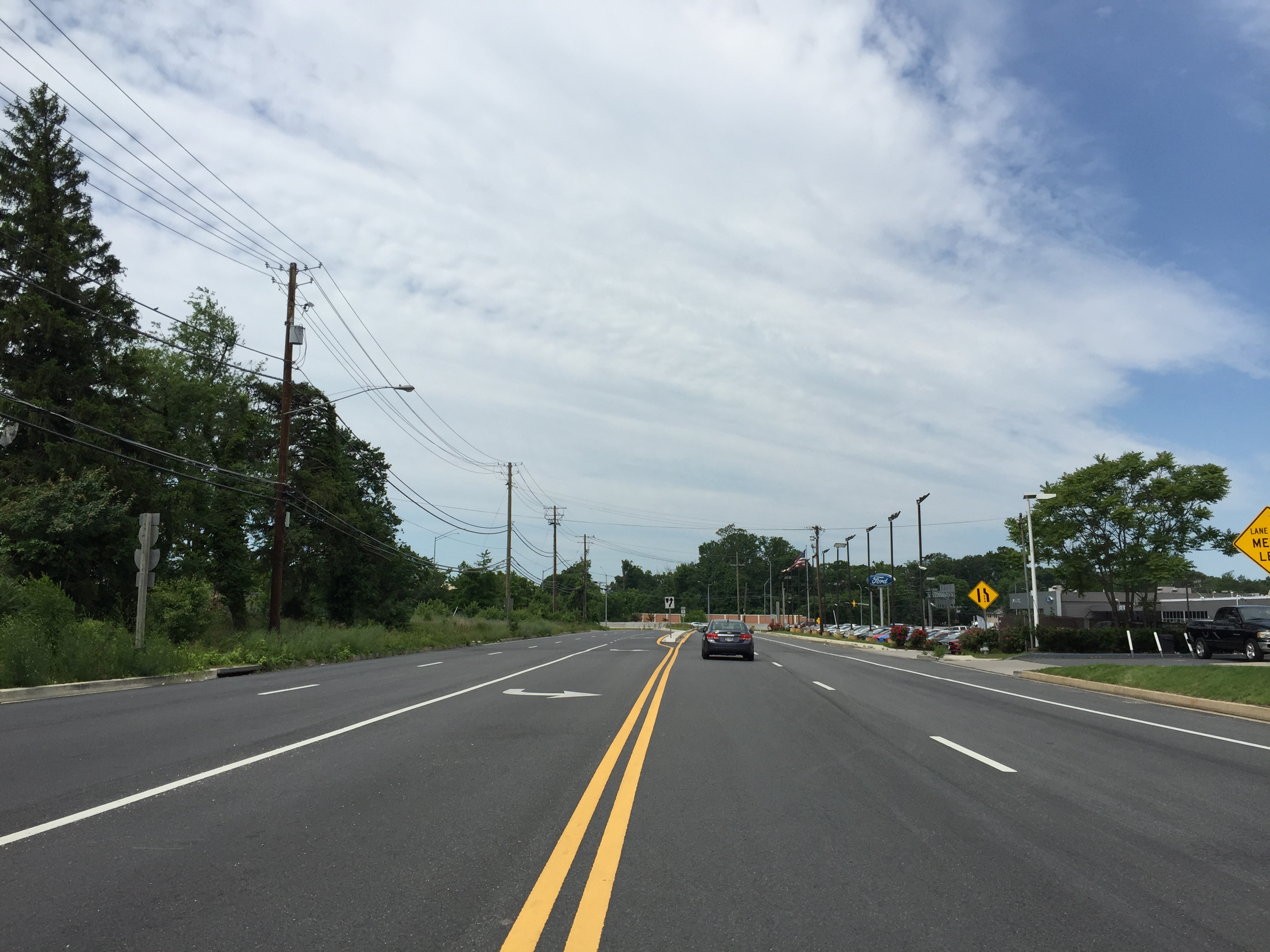
View west along MD 535 in Camp Springs

Maryland Route 535A (Auth Road) connects county-maintained Auth Road with the ramp to Maryland Route 5 in Camp Springs, Prince George's County. It is approximately 0.16 miles (0.26 km) long and is aligned in an east–west direction.

Browse numbered routes
← MD 529	→ MD 537

== MD 537 ==
Maryland Route 537
- Location: Chesapeake City
- Existed: 1949–present

Maryland Route 537 is a collection of unsigned state highways in the U.S. state of Maryland. These two existing highways and two former sections of state highway are segments of old alignment of U.S. Route 213 (US 213), which is now MD 213, in Chesapeake City in southern Cecil County. Some of the roads that became segments of MD 537 were constructed in the mid-1910s as part of the original state road between Elkton and Cecilton. Other portions of MD 537 were part of the approach roads to a bridge across the Chesapeake & Delaware Canal that was built in the mid-1920s and destroyed in 1942. After the modern Chesapeake City Bridge and its approach roads were completed in 1949, US 213 was moved to the new bridge and approach roads and MD 537 was assigned to the bypassed sections of US 213. Much of MD 537 outside of Chesapeake City was transferred to county maintenance in the late 1950s. In 2015, the remaining section of MD 537 north of the canal was turned over to municipal maintenance.

== MD 553 ==
Maryland Route 553
- Location: Anne Arundel County
- Length: 0.67 mi (1,080 m)

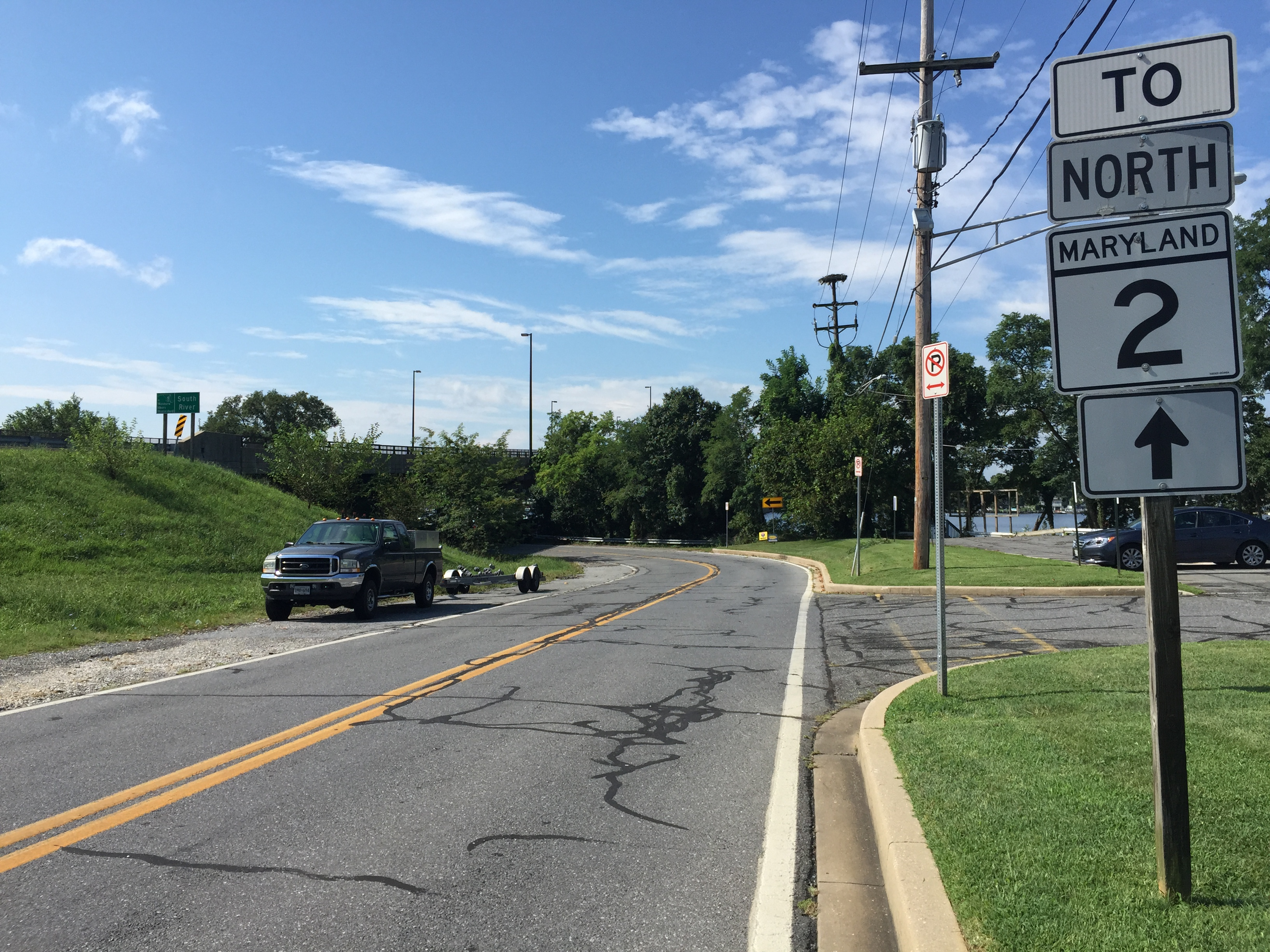
View southeast along MD 553C at MD 2 in Parole

Maryland Route 553 is the unsigned designation for sections of Old South River Road, near Maryland Route 2 in Anne Arundel County, together totaling 0.75 miles (1.21 km) in length:

- 553A begins at a signalled intersection with MD 2 and Virginia Avenue, travelling north to the road's end and intersecting Leeland Road. It is 0.20 miles (0.32 km) in length. In 2015, the northern terminus was shortened by 0.08 miles (0.13 km) due to the installation of a gate.
- 553B begins at road's end and travels north to MD 2 at Oak Grove Road. It intersects MD 553C, and is 0.27 miles (0.43 km) in length.
- 553C is called South River Road, and travels from MD 553B to MD 2. It is 0.10 miles (0.16 km) in length.
- 553D is the designation for Leeland Road, which runs from MD 553A east to an unnamed road. It is 0.10 miles (0.16 km) in length and was designated in 2011.

Browse numbered routes
← MD 552	→ MD 560

== MD 568 ==
Maryland Route 568
- Location: Bishopville
- Length: 0.41 mi (660 m)

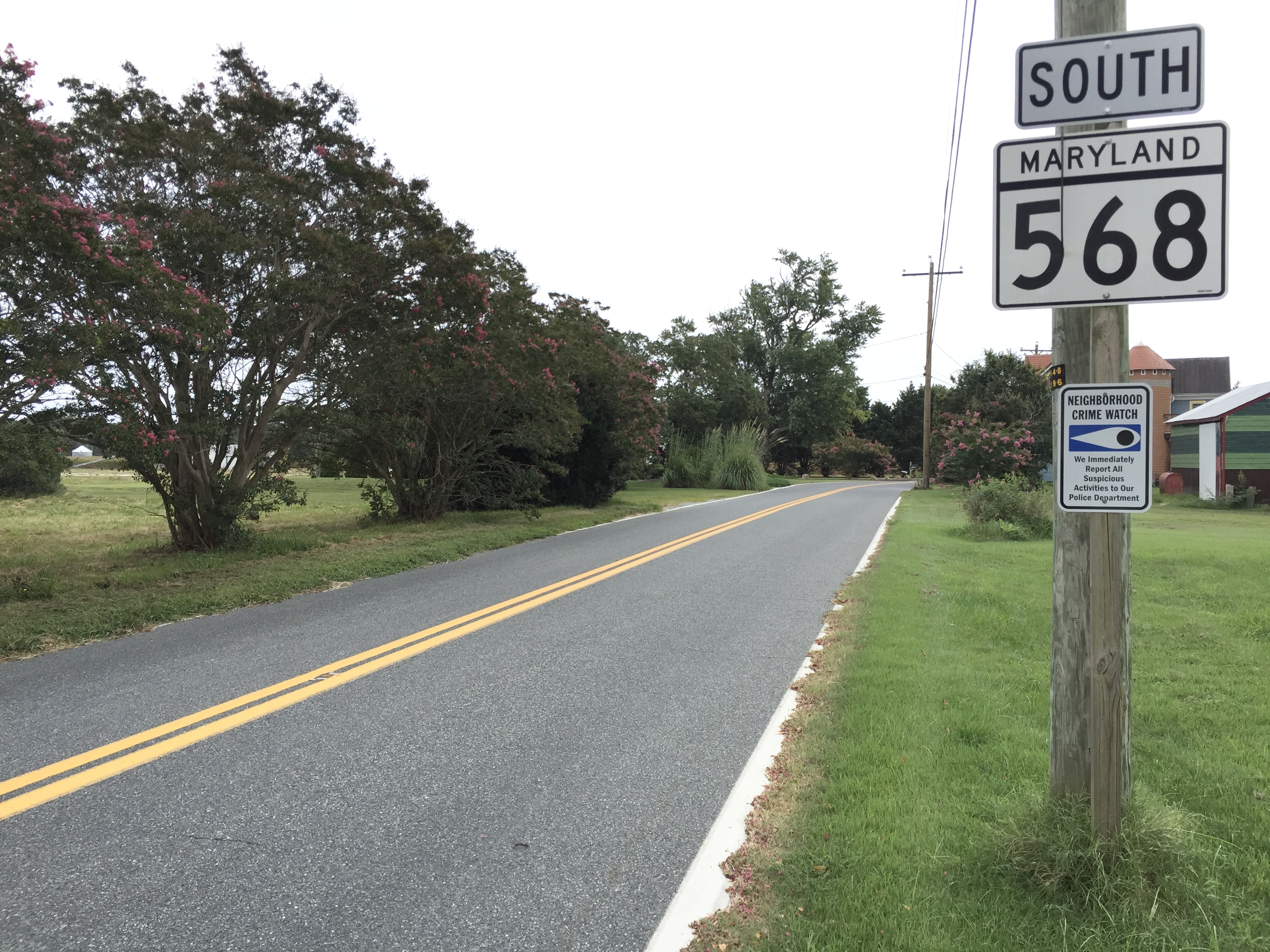
View south along MD 568 at the Delaware state line near Bishopville

Maryland Route 568 is the designation for Hatchery Road, a 0.41 mi (0.66 km) spur that runs from MD 367 in Bishopville north to the Delaware state line, where the highway continues as Bishopville Road toward an intersection with Delaware Route 54 (DE 54) east of Selbyville. MD 568 was originally a segment of MD 368; the roads received their present designations in 1950.

Browse numbered routes
← MD 566	→ MD 570

== MD 584 ==
Maryland Route 584
- Location: Saint Mary's City
- Length: 0.38 mi (610 m)

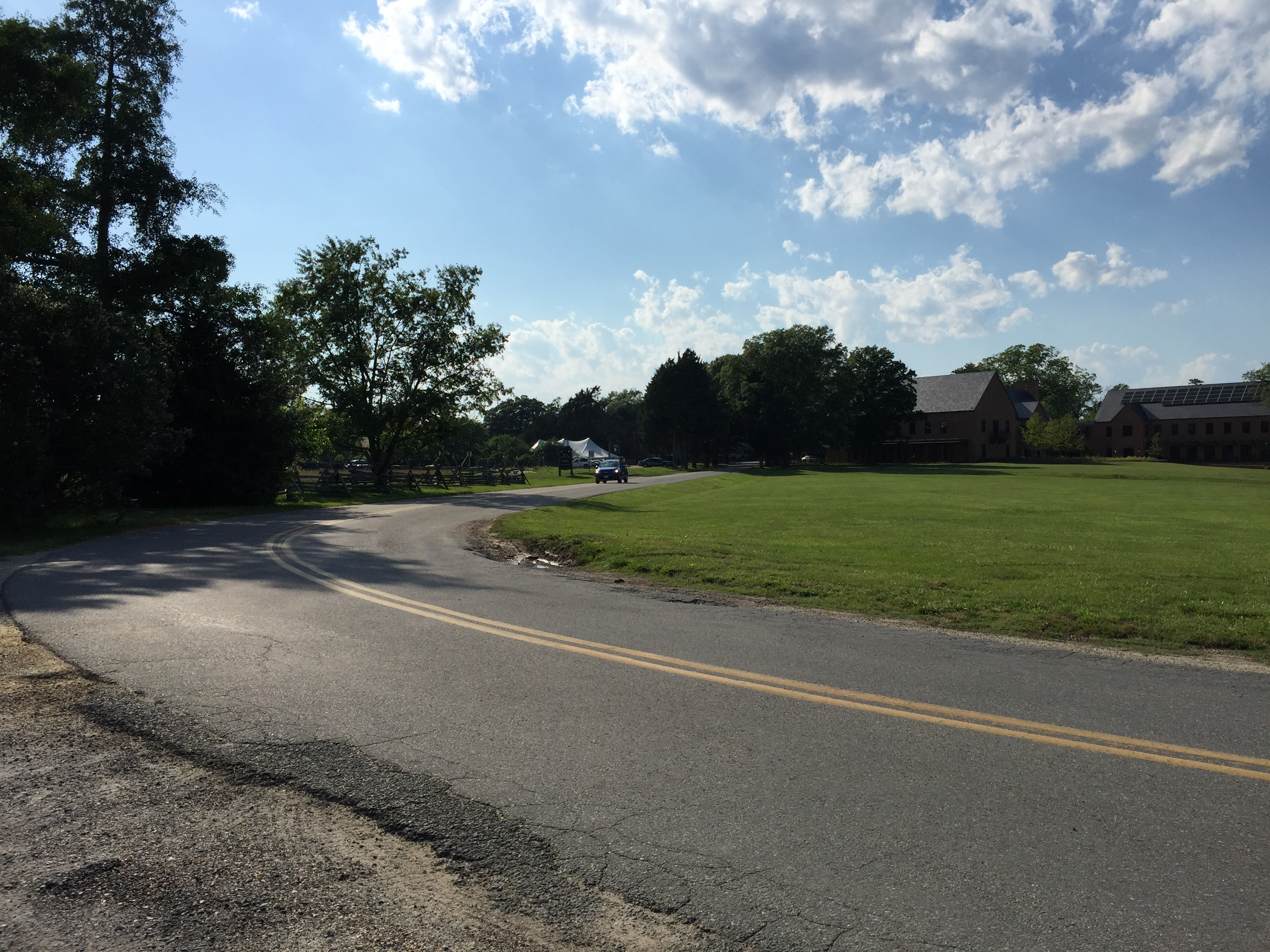
View north at the south end of MD 584 at MD 5 in St. Mary's City

Maryland Route 584 is the unsigned designation for a short loop to the west of MD 5 along Old State House Road and Trinity Church Road in Saint Mary's City in Saint Mary's County. The route is 0.38 miles (0.61 km) long.

Browse numbered routes
← MD 579	→ MD 586

== MD 591 ==
Maryland Route 591
- Location: Conowingo
- Existed: 1934–present

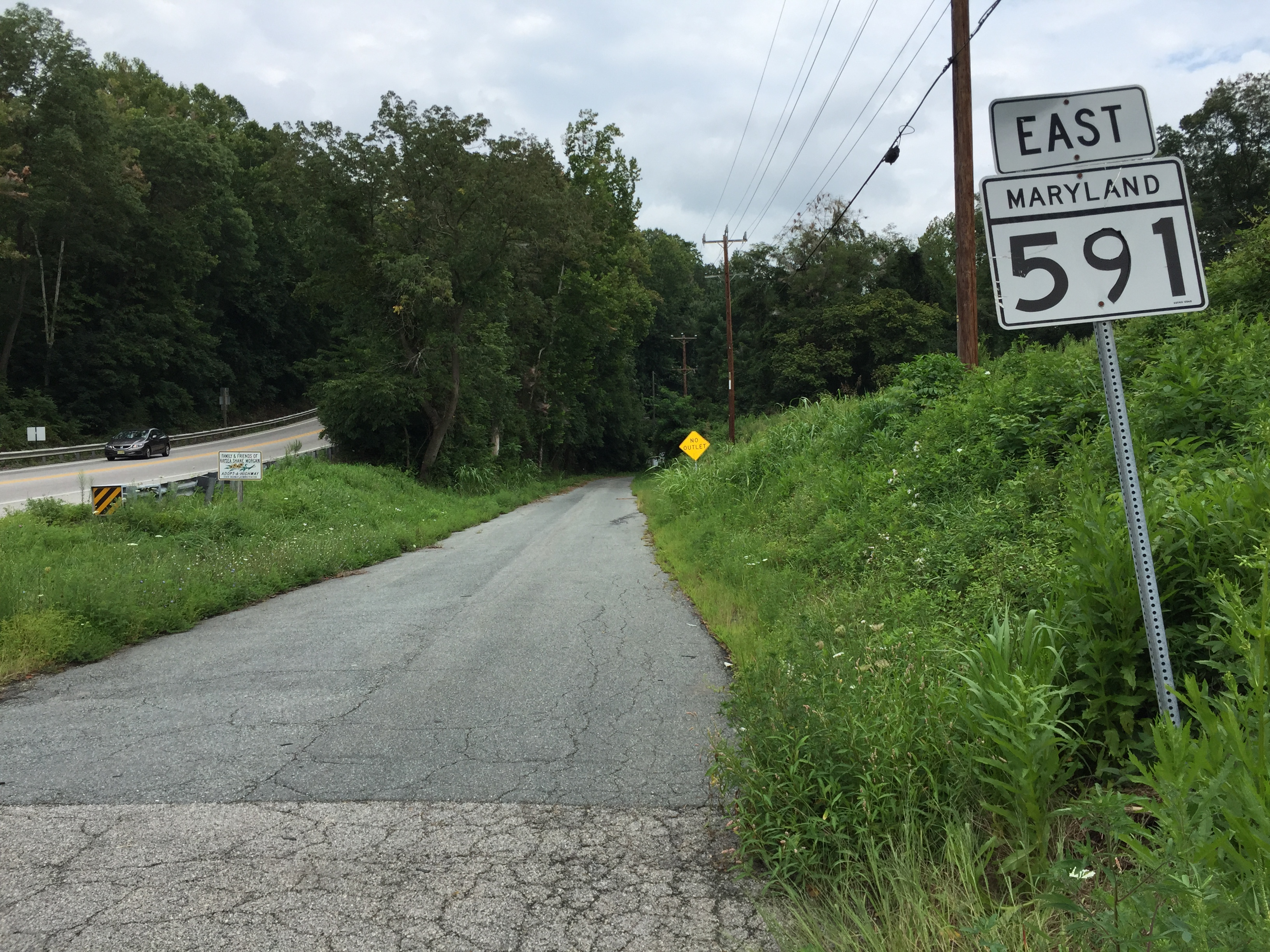
MD 591A eastbound at US 1 near Conowingo

Maryland Route 591 is the designation for a pair of state highways parallel to U.S. Route 1 on either side of Octoraro Creek near Conowingo in northwestern Cecil County.

- MD 591A is named Colora Road. The 0.28-mile-long (0.45 km) route extends from an oblique intersection with US 1 opposite Connelly Road to a barrier on the north side of Octoraro Creek.
- MD 591B is named Porters Bridge Road. The 0.80-mile-long (1.29 km) highway extends from a barrier on the south side of Octoraro Creek, just east of which the route crosses Love Run, to a tangent intersection with US 1.

The first bridge at Richardsmere was constructed to serve Richard Porter's mill on the northwest side of Octoraro Creek in the late 18th century. A wooden covered bridge was constructed at the site around 1858 and washed away in a flood in 1884. A metal Pratt through truss bridge was constructed to replace Porter's Bridge in 1885. This truss bridge served the original state road, later designated US 1 in 1927. The state road west toward Conowingo was paved in 1911, and the state road east toward Rising Sun was completed by 1919. MD 591 was assigned to the route using Porters Bridge after US 1 was relocated and a new bridge upstream from Porters Bridge was completed in 1934. Porters Bridge was closed in January 1978 after a storm caused irreparable damage to the eastern approach to the bridge. The severely deteriorated bridge was scheduled to be dismantled in 2001.

=== References ===
Browse numbered routes
← MD 589	→ MD 594

== MD 617 ==
Maryland Route 617
- Location: Caroline County
- Length: 0.35 mi (560 m)

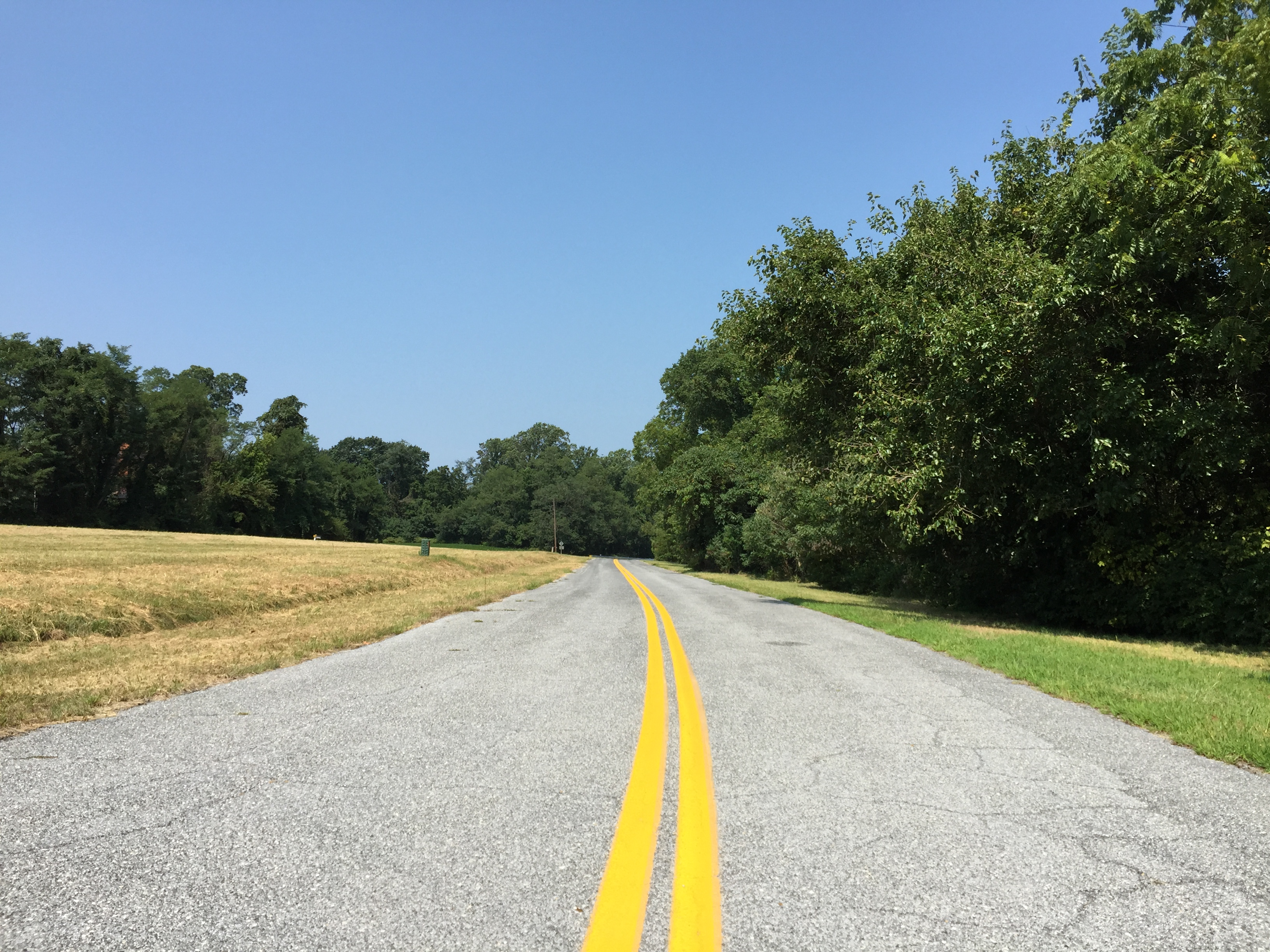
View north along MD 617 at Beauchamp Branch Road in Caroline County

Maryland Route 617 is the unsigned designation for an unnamed road connecting Maryland Route 16A (Beauchamp Branch Road) north to Maryland Route 16 (Harmony Road) in Caroline County. The route is 0.35 miles (0.56 km) long.

Browse numbered routes
← MD 615	→ MD 619

== MD 631 ==
Maryland Route 631
- Location: Brandywine
- Length: 0.35 mi (560 m)

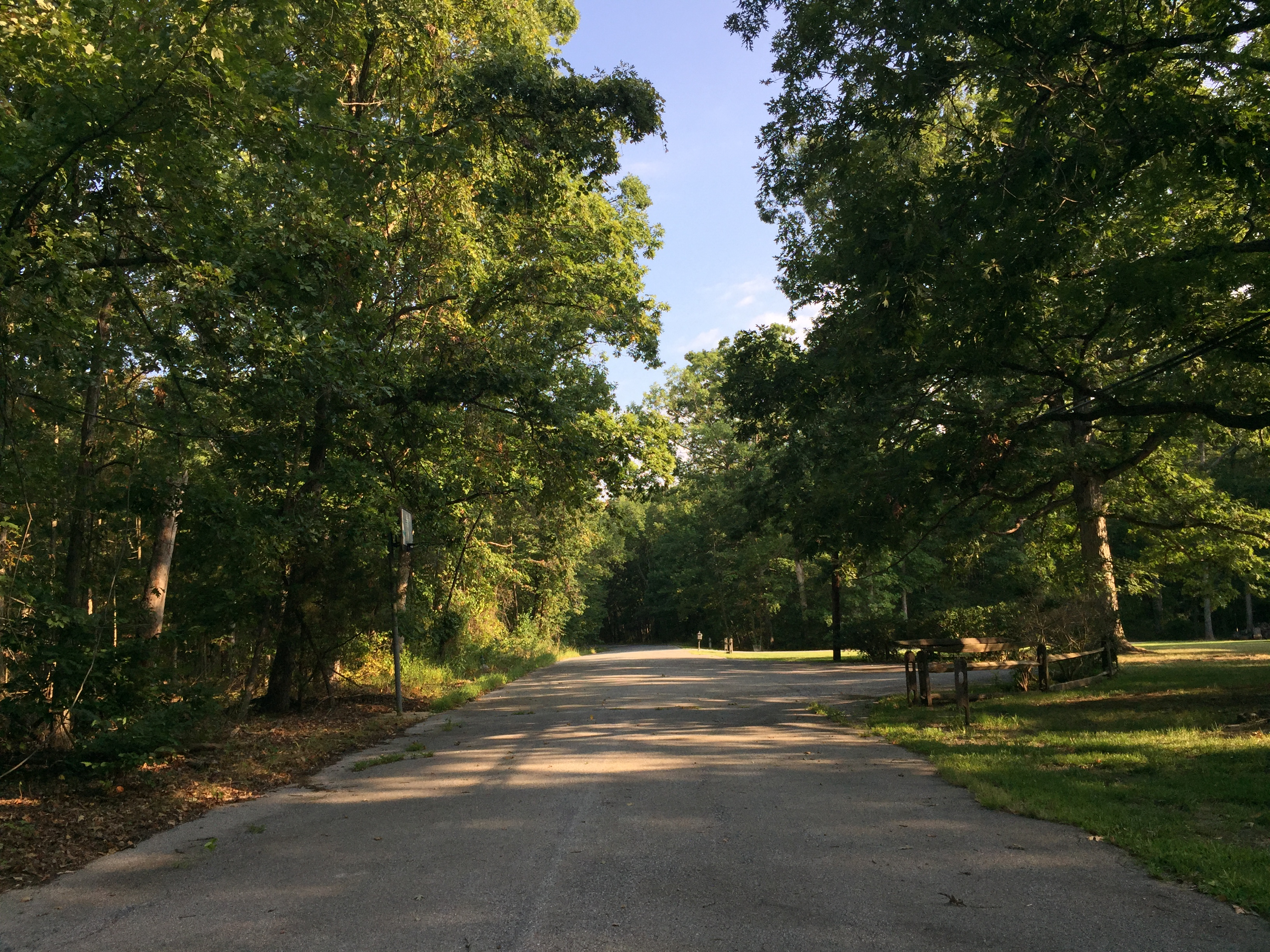
View north along MD 631 in Brandywine

Maryland Route 631 is the unsigned designation for Old Brandywine Road, a 0.35-mile (0.56 km) spur south from the intersection of MD 373 and Brandywine Road south to a dead end adjacent to the US 301–MD 5 interchange in Brandywine.

Browse numbered routes
← MD 627	→ MD 632

== MD 636 ==
Maryland Route 636
- Location: Cresaptown
- Length: 0.28 mi (450 m)

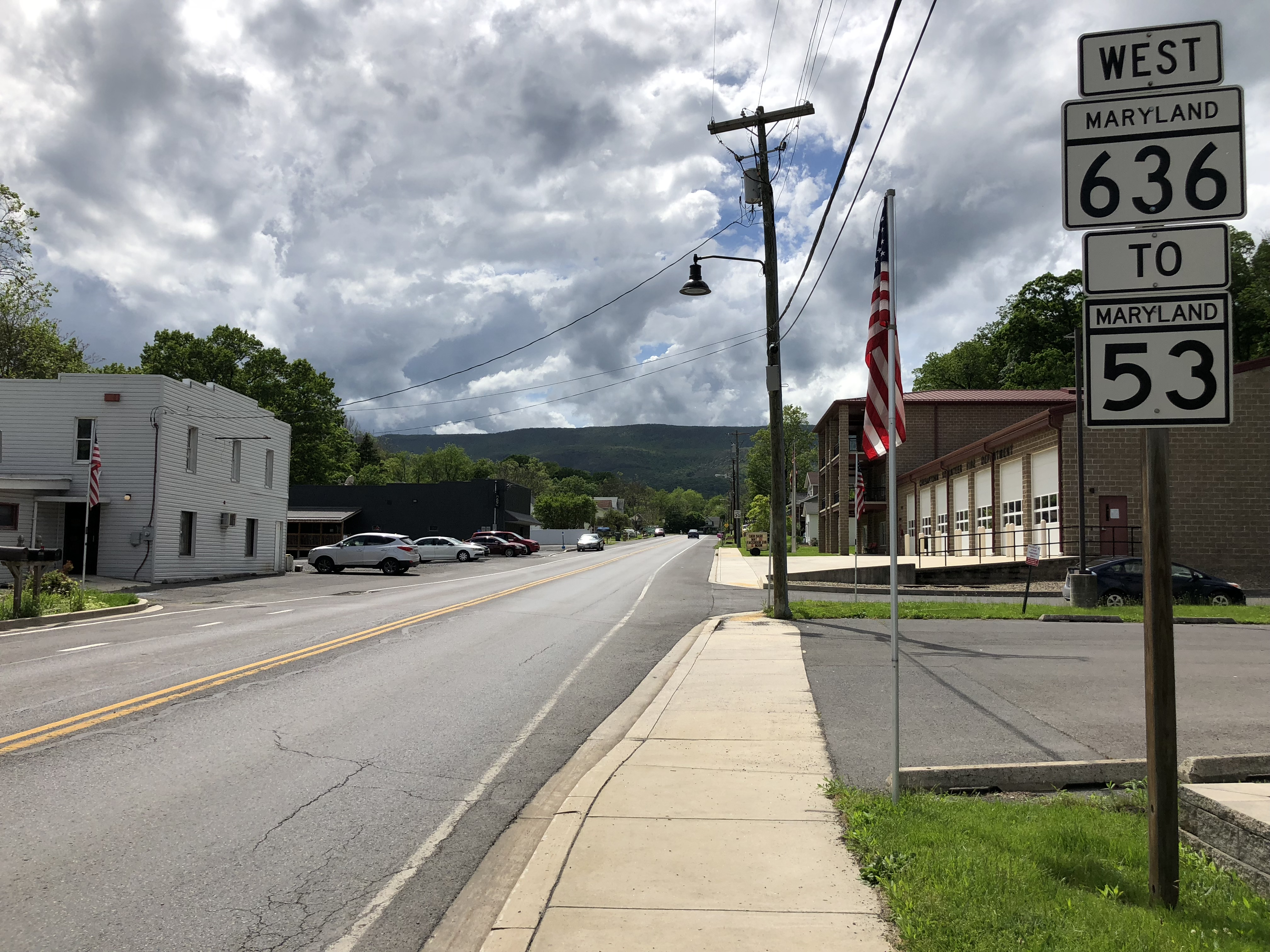
MD 636 westbound in Cresaptown

Maryland Route 636 is the designation for Warrior Drive, which runs 0.28 miles (0.45 km) from MD 53 east to US 220 within Cresaptown, crossing Warrior Run twice. The westbound direction of MD 636 is used by traffic from US 220 to access MD 53. MD 636 was under construction by 1936 and completed by 1938.

Browse numbered routes
← MD 632	→ MD 637

== MD 637 ==
Maryland Route 637
- Location: Prince George's County
- Length: 0.61 mi (980 m)

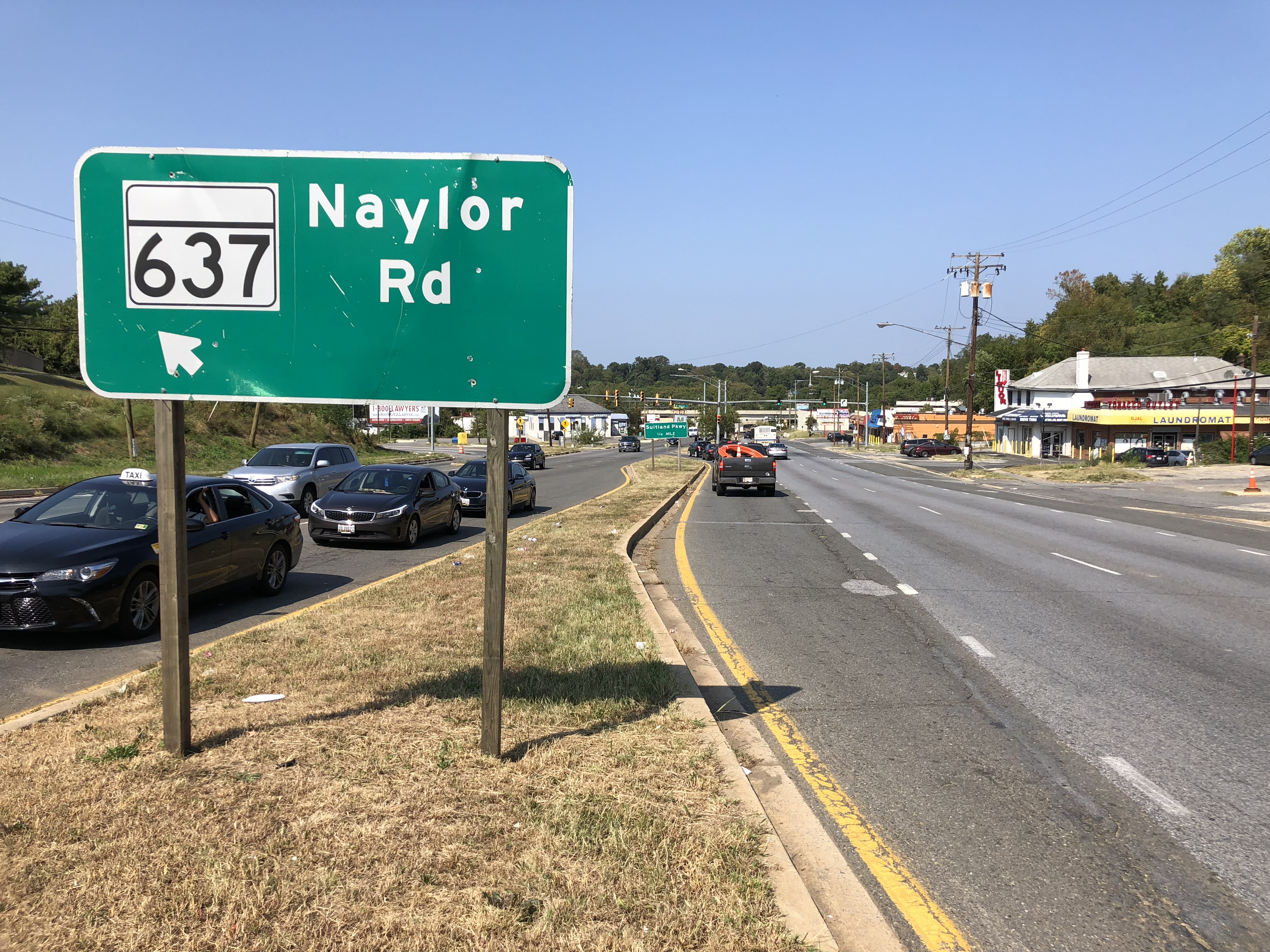
The east end of MD 637 at MD 5 in Silver Hill

Maryland Route 637 is the designation for Naylor Road, which connects Maryland Route 5 with the Washington, D.C. Line in Prince George's County. The only signage for the route exists along MD 5. It is approximately 0.61 miles (0.98 km) long and is aligned in an east-west direction.

Browse numbered routes
← MD 636	→ MD 638

== MD 640 ==
Maryland Route 640
- Location: Somerset County
- Length: 0.58 mi (930 m)

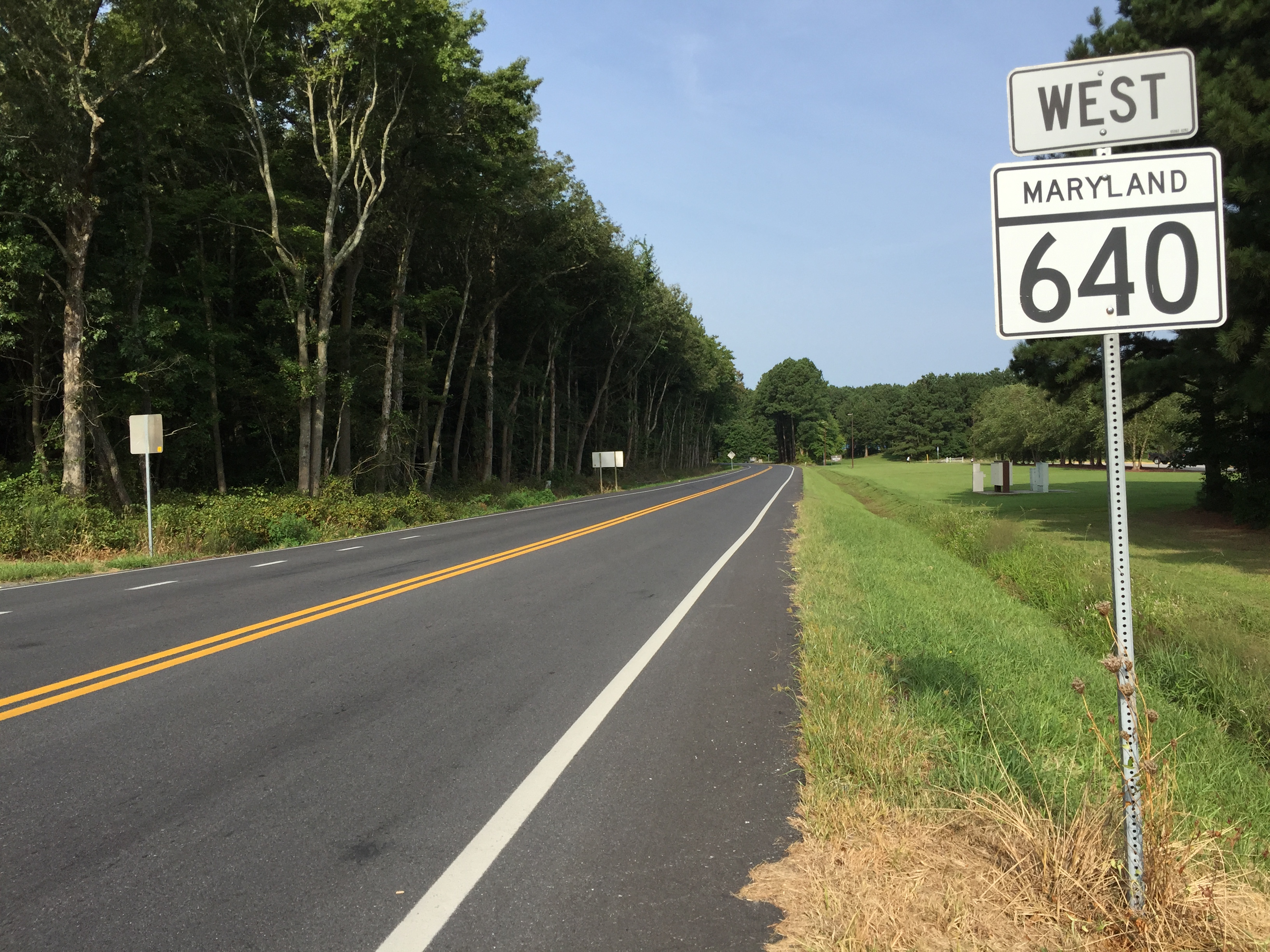
View west along MD 640 at US 13 in Somerset County

Maryland Route 640 is the designation for a part of Revells Neck Road in Somerset County running from U.S. Route 13 west to the Eastern Correctional Institution. The route is 0.58 miles (0.93 km) long. Around 1946, a much larger section of Revells Neck Road was designated MD 697.

Browse numbered routes
← MD 639	→ MD 642

== MD 642 ==
Maryland Route 642
- Location: Orchard Beach
- Length: 0.08 mi (130 m)

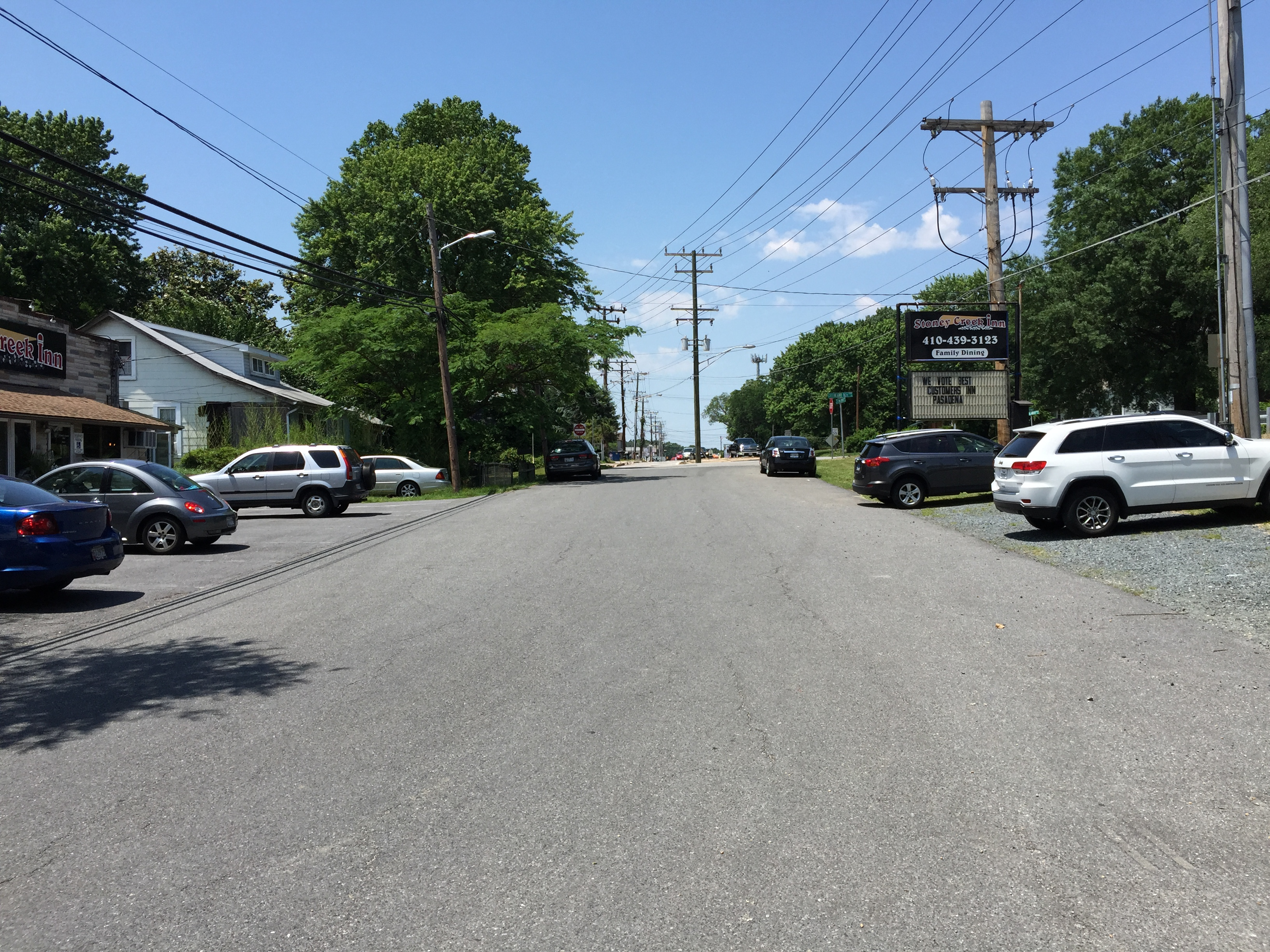
MD 642 in Orchard Beach

Maryland Route 642 is the unsigned designation for Greenland Beach Road, a 0.08 mi (0.13 km) spur that runs east from MD 173 (Fort Smallwood Road) in Orchard Beach. The state highway is the old alignment of MD 173 just west of Stony Creek. MD 642 was assigned around 1947 when the present bridge over Stony Creek was completed.

Browse numbered routes
← MD 640	→ MD 644

== MD 644 ==
Maryland Route 644
- Location: Arbutus

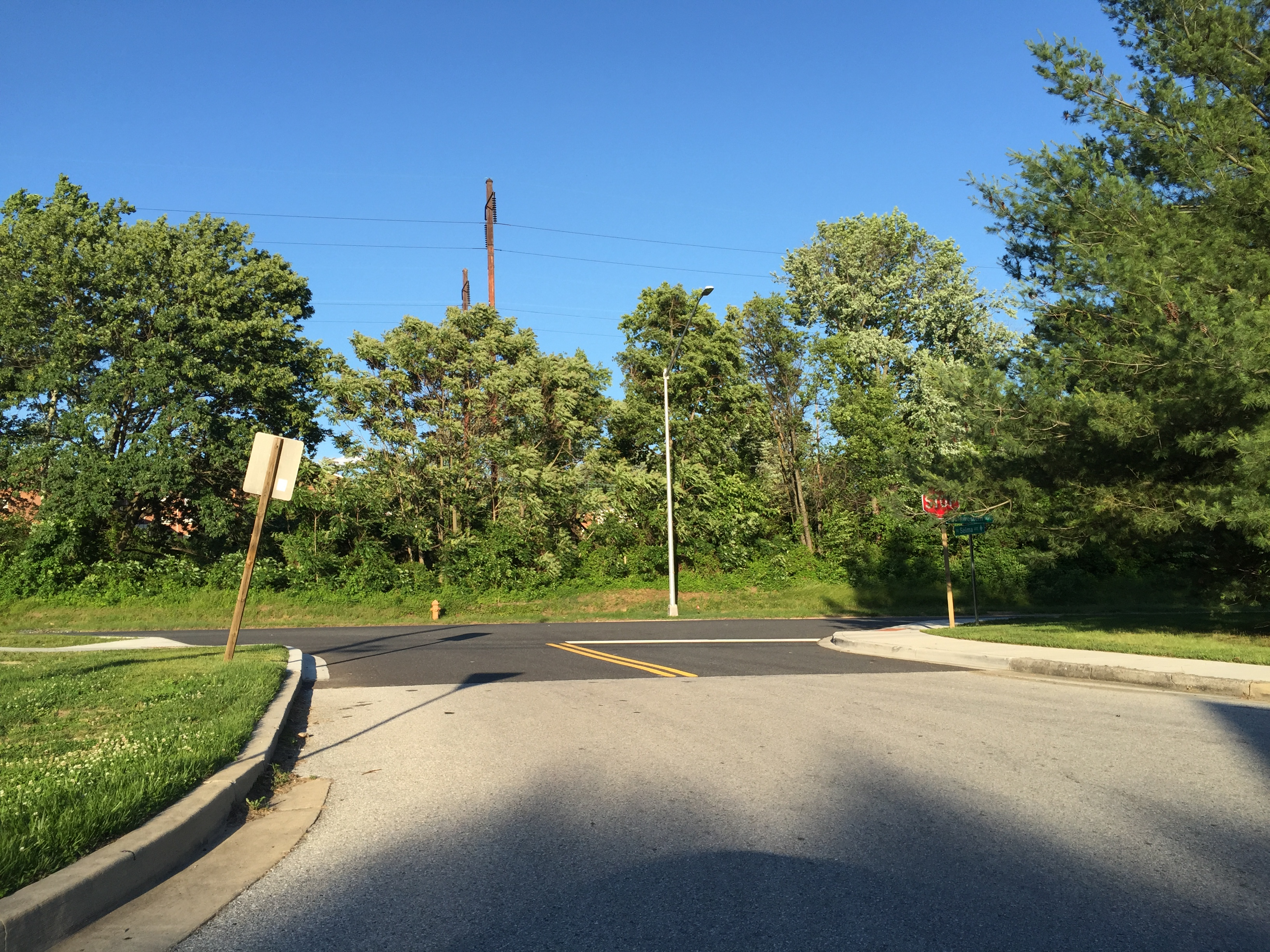
MD 644C at US 1 in Arbutus

Maryland Route 644 is the unsigned designation for two short spurs off US 1 in Arbutus, Baltimore County.

- MD 644C follows Linden Avenue Spur, which runs from Linden Avenue and Sulphur Spring Road east to US 1. The route is 0.03 mi (0.048 km) long. The roadway was built in 1948 and designated MD 644C in 2012.
- MD 644D follows Selma Avenue Spur, which runs from Selma Avenue east to US 1. The route is 0.03 mi (0.048 km) long. The roadway was built in 1948 and designated MD 644D in 2012.

Browse numbered routes
← MD 642	→ MD 645

== MD 645 ==
Maryland Route 645
- Location: Harmans

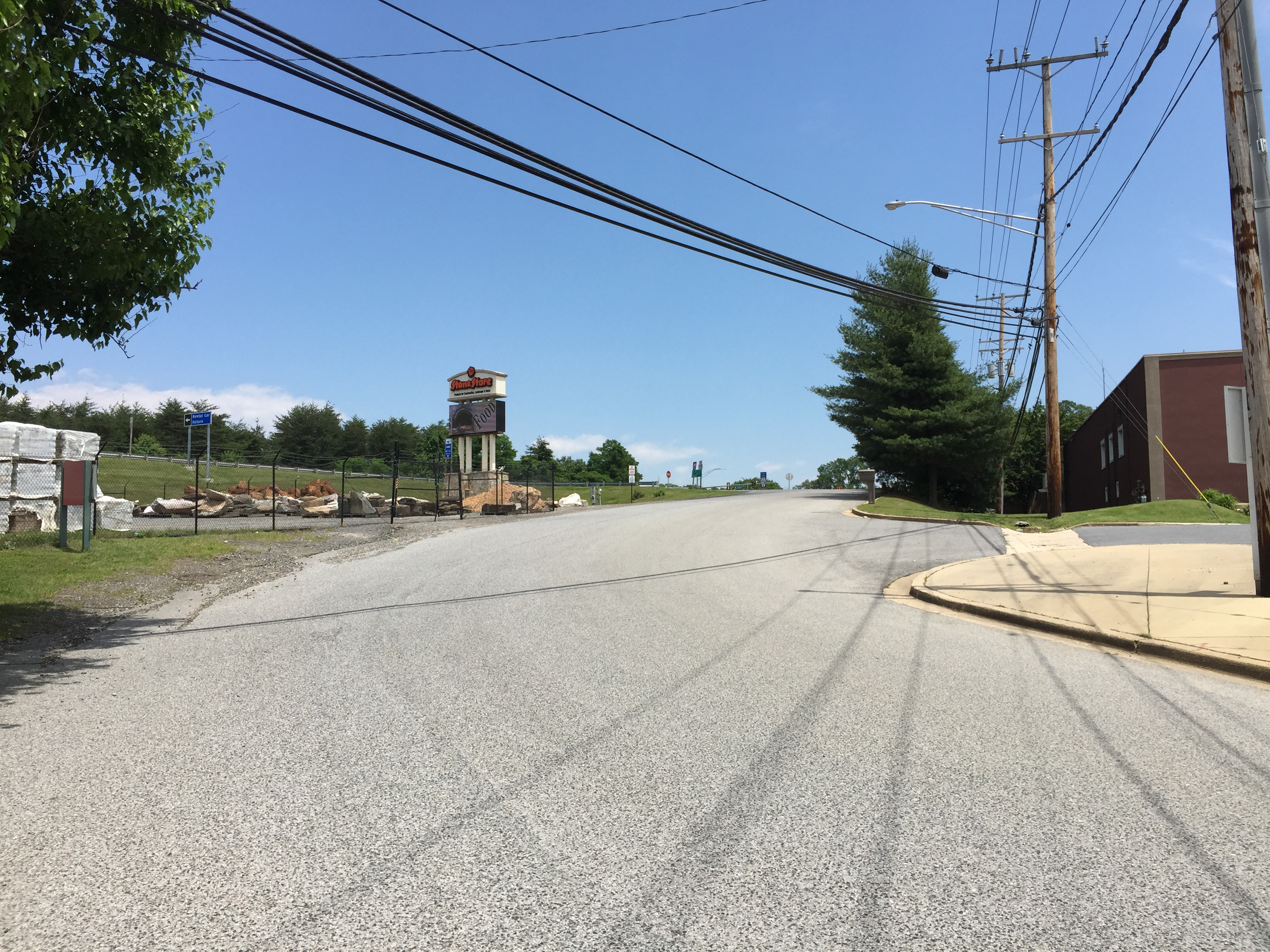
MD 645B in Harmans

Maryland Route 645 is the unsigned designation for two segments of Old Dorsey Road in Harmans, Anne Arundel County.

- MD 645B follows Old Dorsey Road from Railroad Avenue east to a dead end. The route is 0.12 mi (0.19 km) long.
- MD 645D follows Old Dorsey Road from MD 645B north to MD 176. The route is 0.03 mi (0.048 km) long.

Browse numbered routes
← MD 644	→ MD 646

== MD 652 ==
Maryland Route 652
- Location: Harmans
- Length: 0.69 mi (1,110 m)

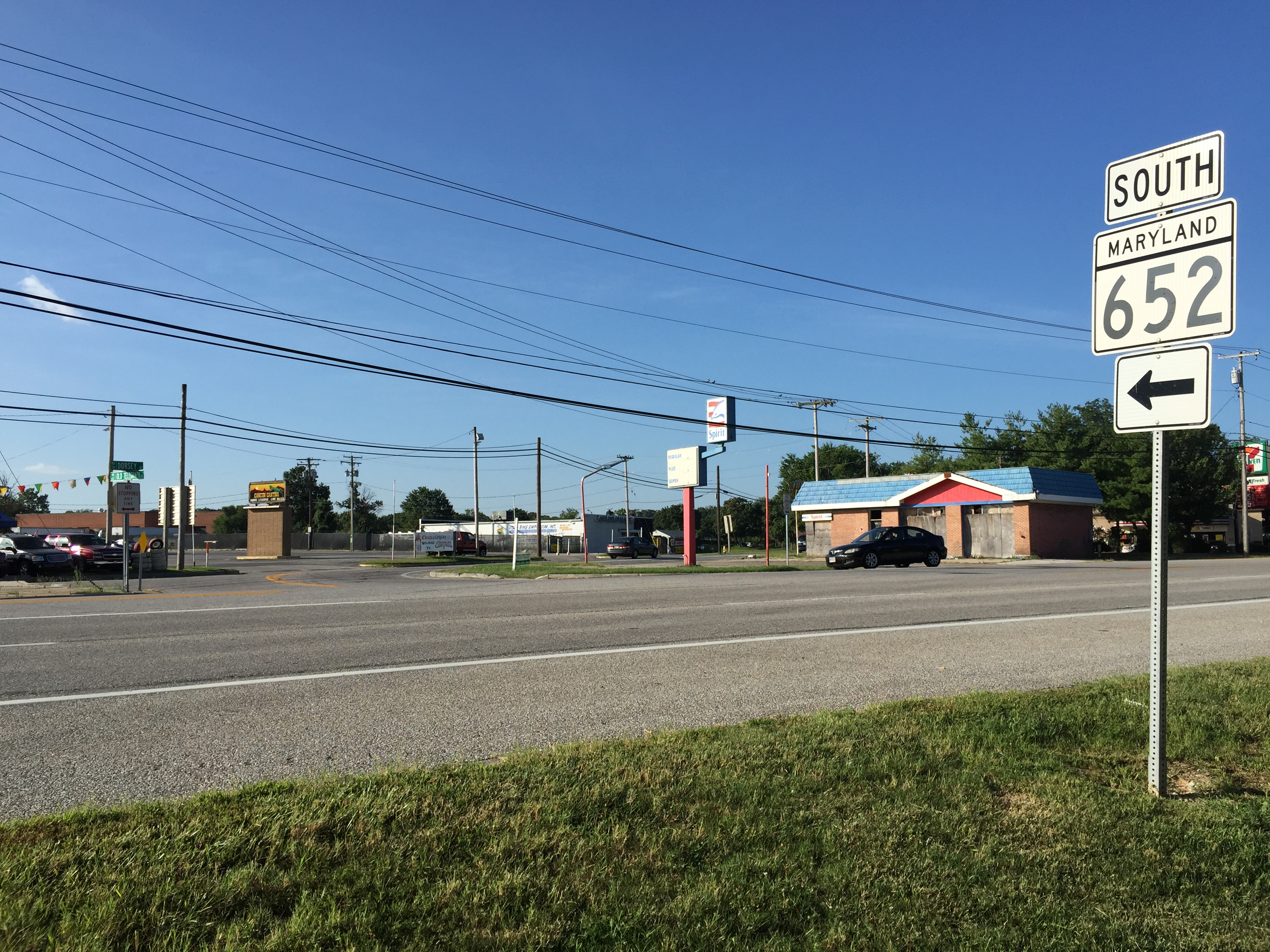
View south from the north end of MD 652 at MD 176 in Harmans

Maryland Route 652 is the designation for Old Telegraph Road, which runs 0.69 mi (1.11 km) from a dead end north to MD 176 in Harmans, Anne Arundel County.

Browse numbered routes
← MD 650	→ MD 655

== MD 656 ==
Maryland Route 656
- Location: Queenstown
- Length: 0.70 mi (1,130 m)

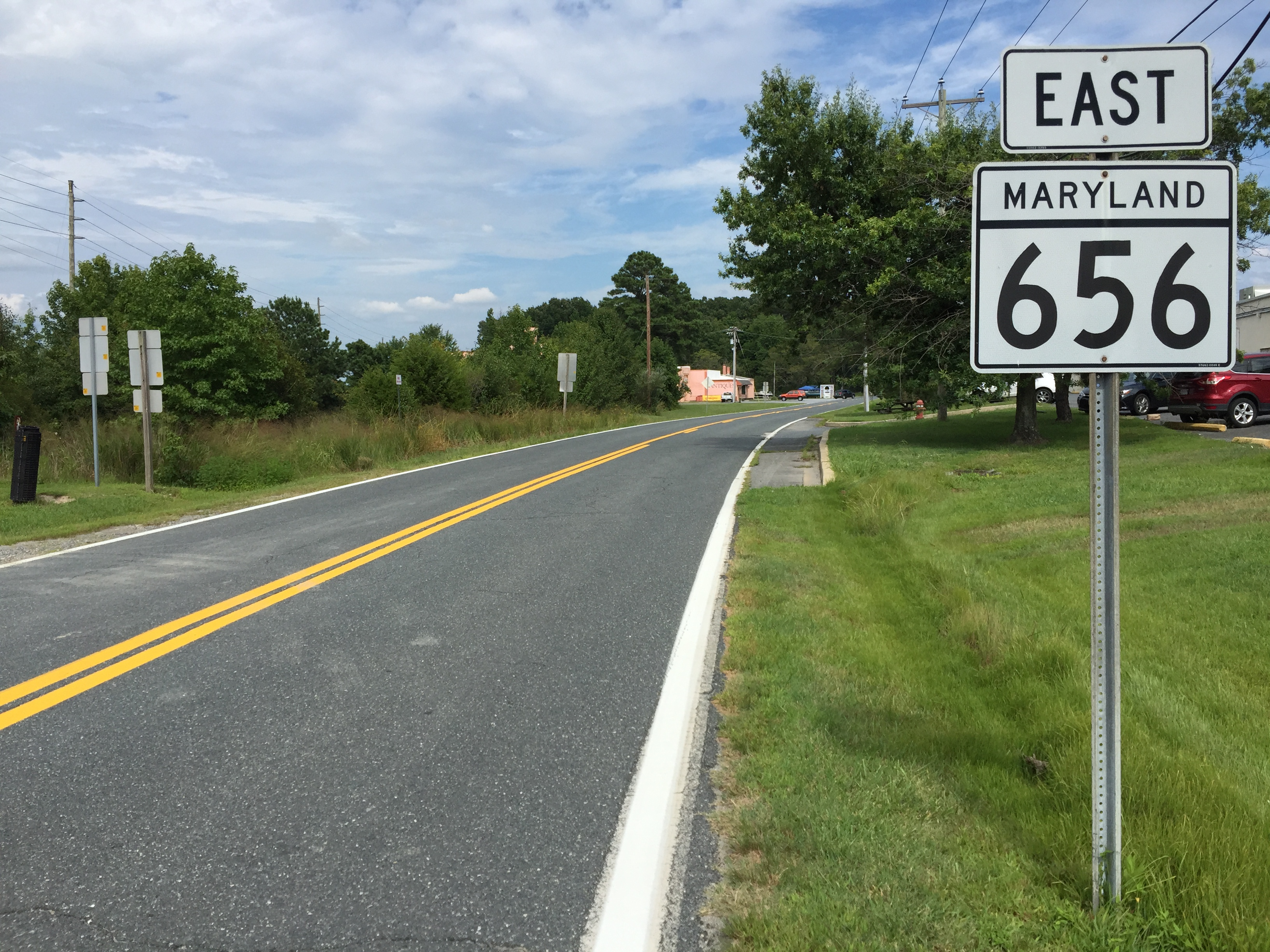
View east along MD 656 at MD 18 in Queenstown

Maryland Route 656 is the designation for Friels Road, which runs 0.70 mi (1.13 km) from MD 18 next to the Queenstown Premium Outlets east to MD 456 within Queenstown.

Browse numbered routes
← MD 655	→ MD 658

== MD 658 ==
Maryland Route 658
- Location: La Vale
- Length: 0.84 mi (1,350 m)

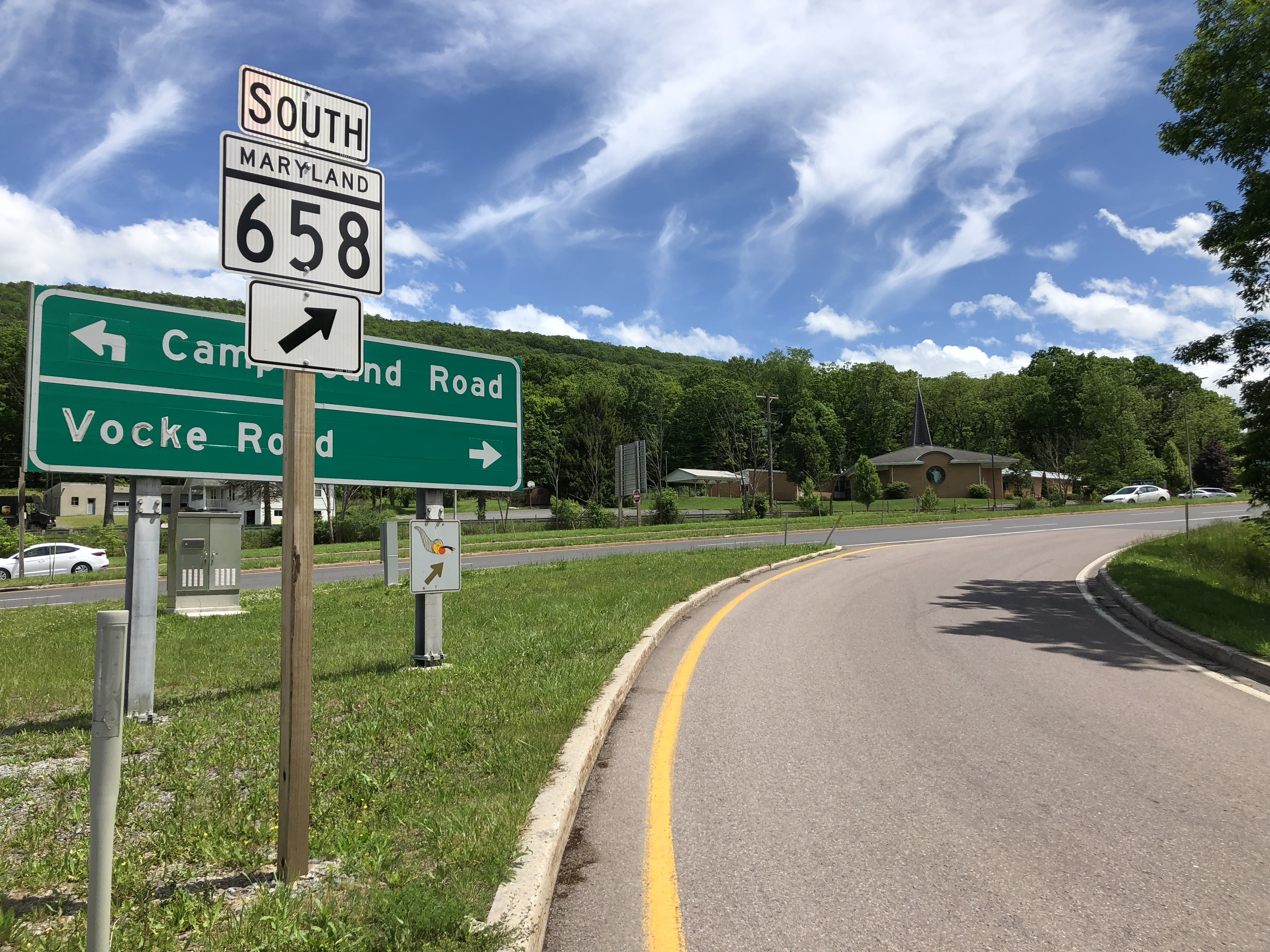
View south along MD 658 at I-68/US 40 in La Vale

Maryland Route 658 is a state highway that runs 0.84 miles (1.35 km) from MD 53 north to US 40 Alternate within La Vale. The highway west of I-68 is part of US 220 Truck, which provides access from eastbound I-68 to southbound US 220 in Cresaptown for trucks due to a truck prohibition on the eastbound exit ramp for I-68's interchange with US 220. MD 658 begins at an intersection with MD 53 (Winchester Road) and heads northeast as Vocke Road, a four-lane divided highway. The state highway passes the Country Club Mall and the District 6 offices of the Maryland State Highway Administration before intersecting a segment of Braddock Road, which is unsigned MD 949. MD 658 intersects entrance and exit ramps from Exit 40 of eastbound I-68 and US 40 (National Freeway). The highway passes under the freeway and meets an exit ramp from westbound I-68 and the western terminus of MD 49 (Braddock Road) at the next intersection, where the highway's name changes to Campground Road. MD 658 turns north, crossing Braddock Run, and reduces to a four-lane undivided highway before reaching its northern terminus at US 40 Alternate (National Pike). MD 658 was assigned to Campground Road as a connector between US 40 and MD 49 in 1939. The state highway was extended south along Vocke Road to MD 53 around 1948. MD 658 was expanded to a divided highway from MD 53 to MD 49 around 1972 in conjunction with the construction of I-68 through La Vale.

- MD 658A is the designation for Service Road, which runs 0.116 miles (0.187 km) from the intersection of MD 658 and MD 949 north to the end of state maintenance. The route was designated in 2014.

=== References ===
Browse numbered routes
← MD 656	→ MD 660

== MD 660 ==
Maryland Route 660
- Location: Rockville
- Length: 0.05 mi (80 m)

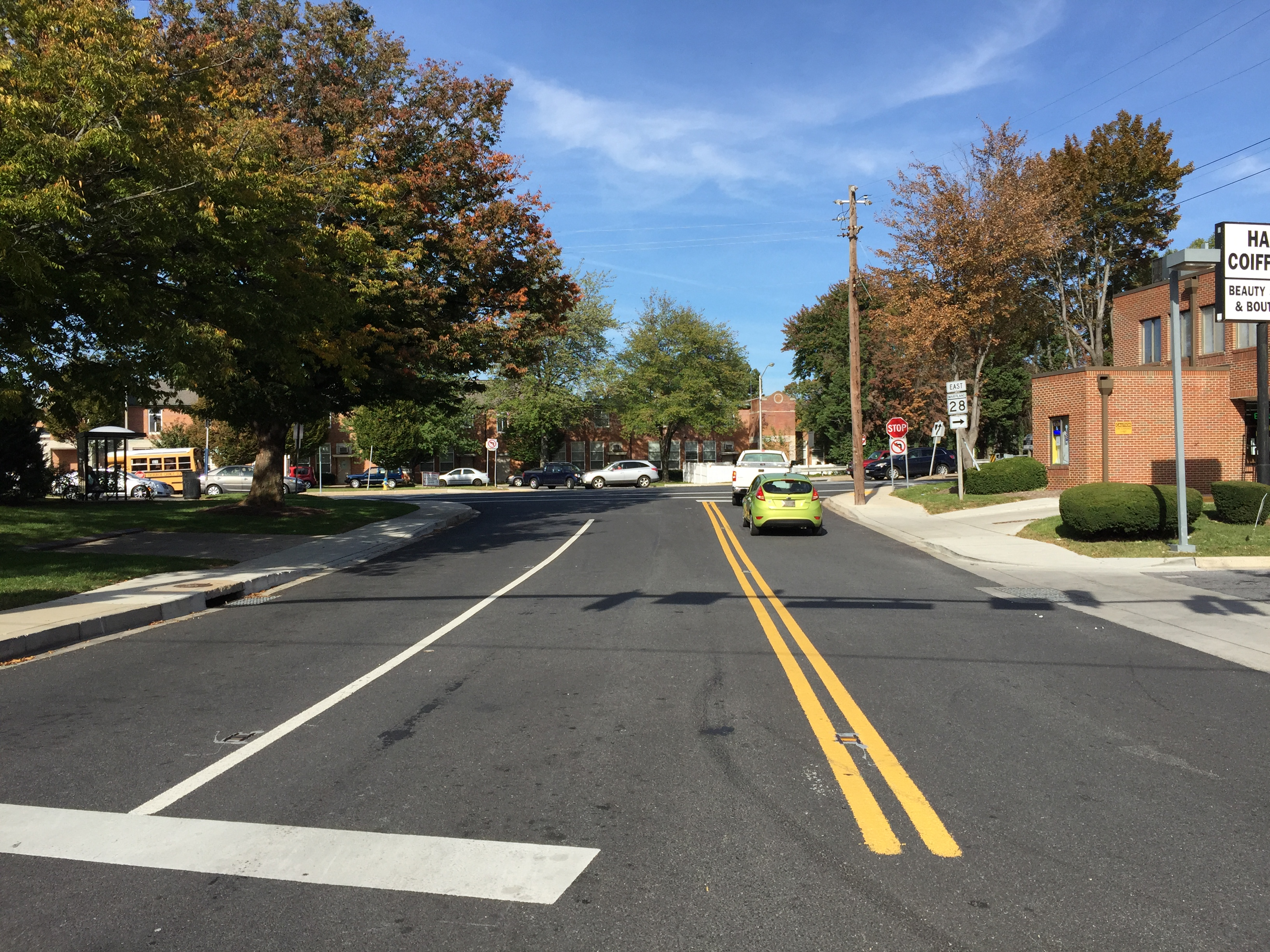
MD 660 at MD 355 in Rockville

Maryland Route 660 is the unsigned designation for Dodge Street, which runs 0.05 mi (0.080 km) from MD 355 north to MD 28 in Rockville, Montgomery County.

Browse numbered routes
← MD 658	→ MD 662

== MD 668 ==
Maryland Route 668
- Location: Carroll County
- Length: 0.14 mi (230 m)

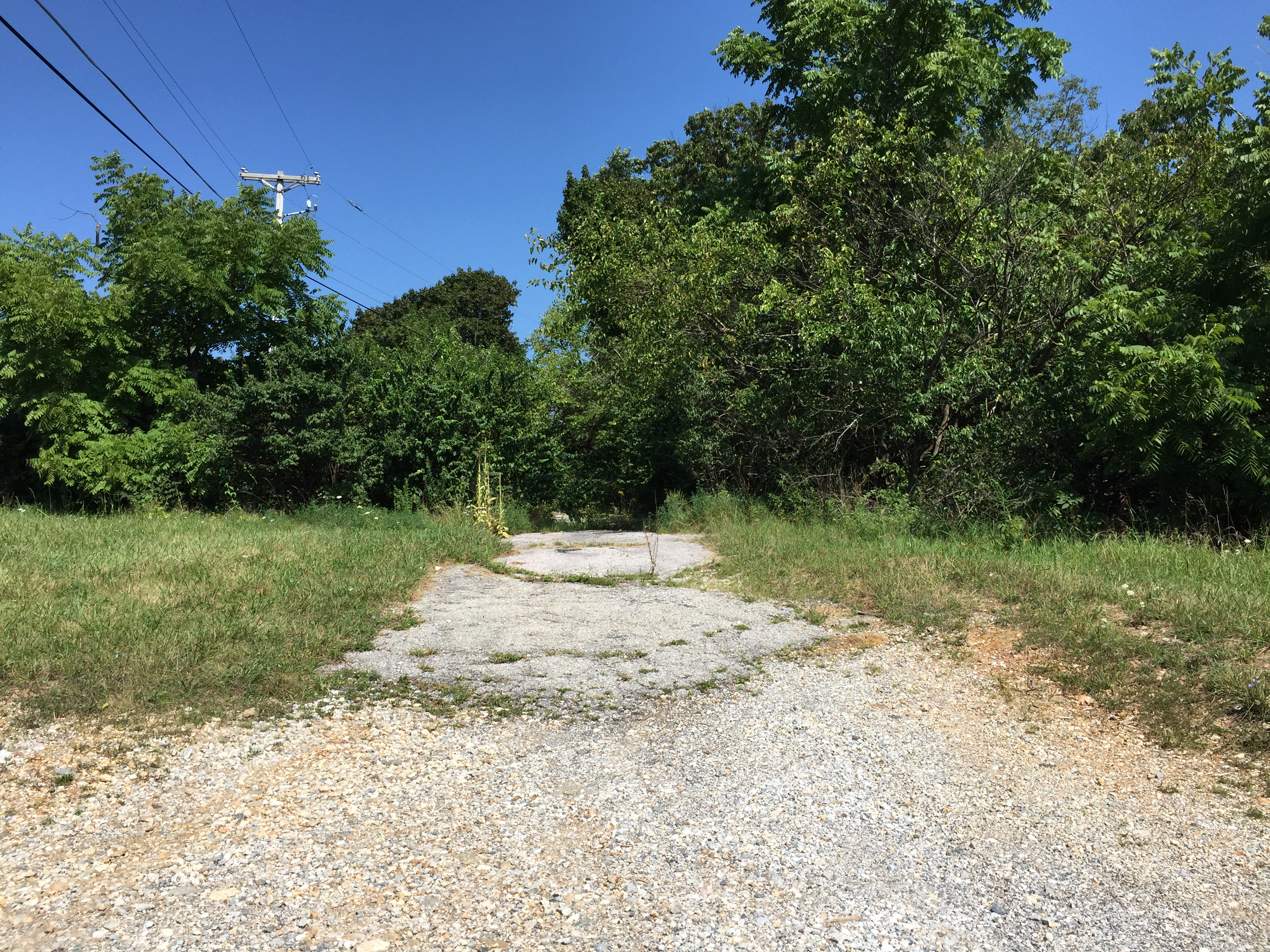
View north at the south end of MD 668 in Carroll County

Maryland Route 668 is the unsigned designation for Boswells Drive, a road that runs 0.14 mi (0.23 km) from Harvey Yingling Road north to a dead end parallel to the southbound side of MD 30 just south of the Pennsylvania state line north of Manchester in northeastern Carroll County.

=== References ===
Browse numbered routes
← MD 667	→ MD 669

== MD 672 ==
Maryland Route 672
- Location: Anne Arundel County
- Length: 0.19 mi (310 m)

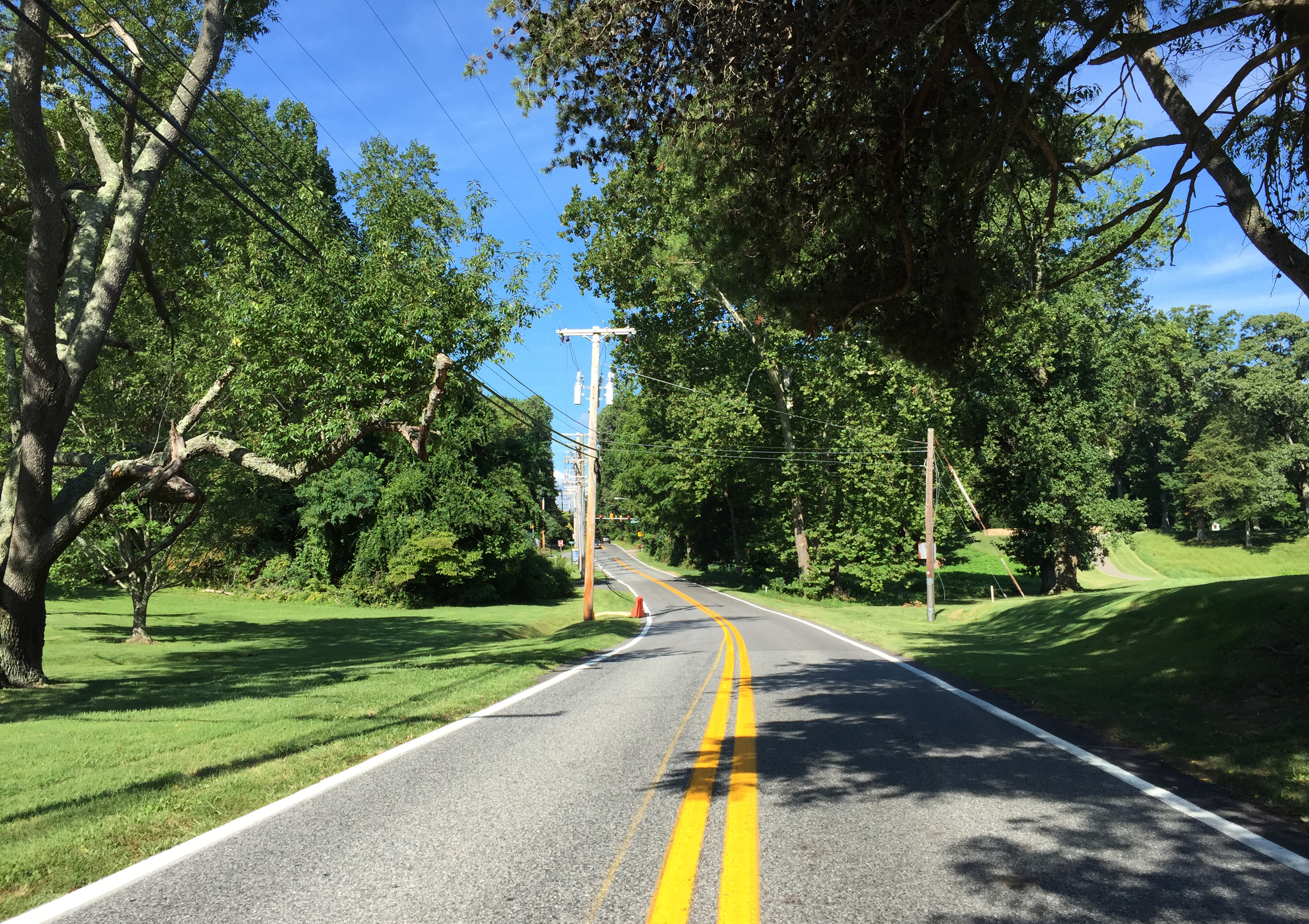
View west along MD 672 in Anne Arundel County

Maryland Route 672 is the unsigned designation for a portion of Greenbury Point Road northeast of Annapolis in Anne Arundel County, running 0.19 mi (0.31 km) from MD 648 east to the end of state maintenance.

Browse numbered routes
← MD 670	→ MD 673

== MD 673 ==
Maryland Route 673
- Location: Westover
- Length: 0.53 mi (850 m)

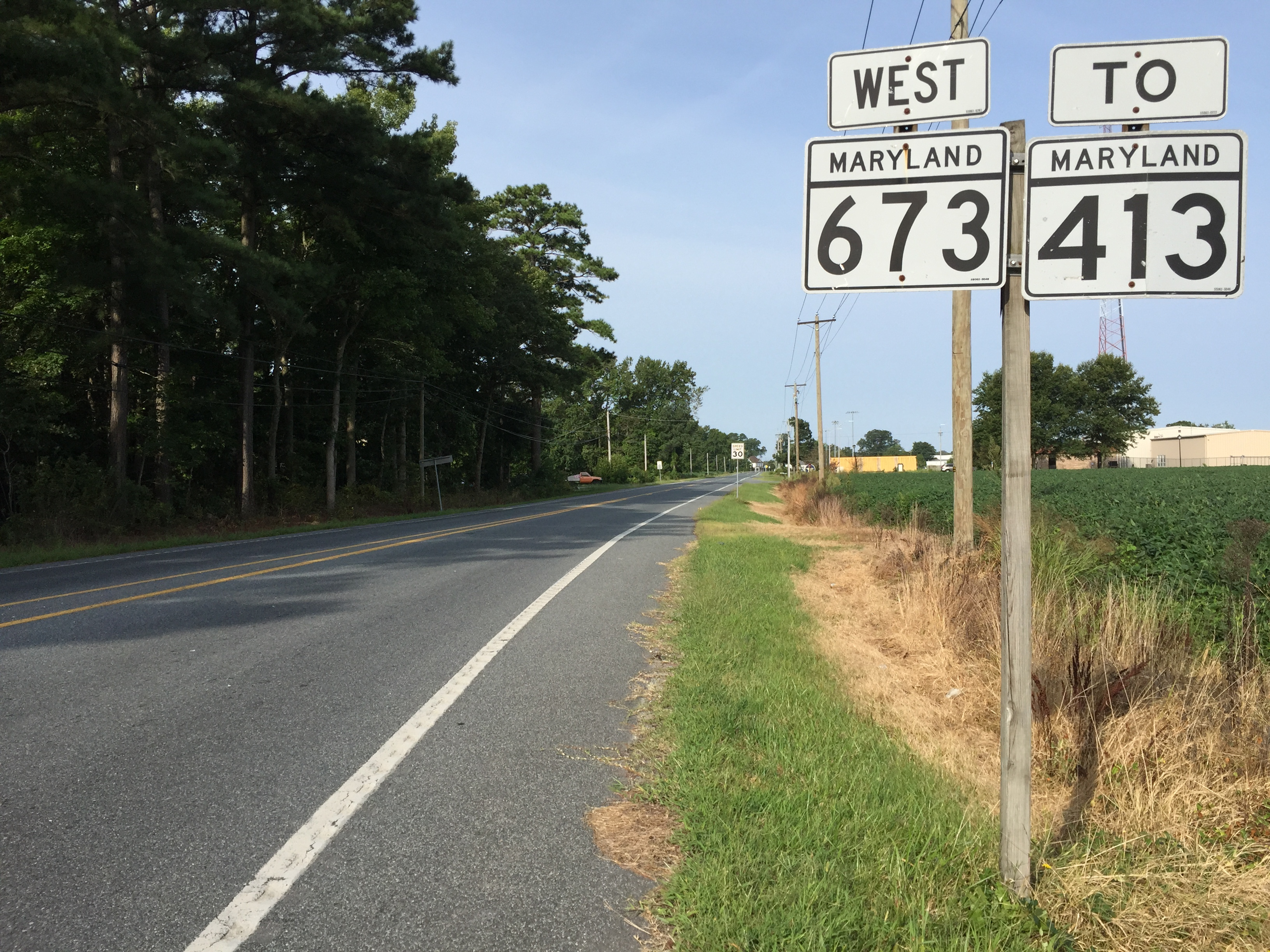
View west along MD 673 at US 13 in Westover

Maryland Route 673 is the designation for Sam Barnes Road, a short road that connects Maryland Route 413 to U.S. Route 13 in Somerset County. The route is 0.53 miles (0.85 km) long. The route is a former piece of MD 413; it was created when MD 413 and US 13 were realigned. MD 673 provides the only access from northbound US 13 to southbound MD 413. The route also grants access to the Somerset County Recreation and Parks facility as well as the county sheriff's office.

Browse numbered routes
← MD 672	→ MD 674

== MD 674 ==
Maryland Route 674
- Location: Rock Hall
- Length: 0.25 mi (400 m)
- Existed: 1940–present

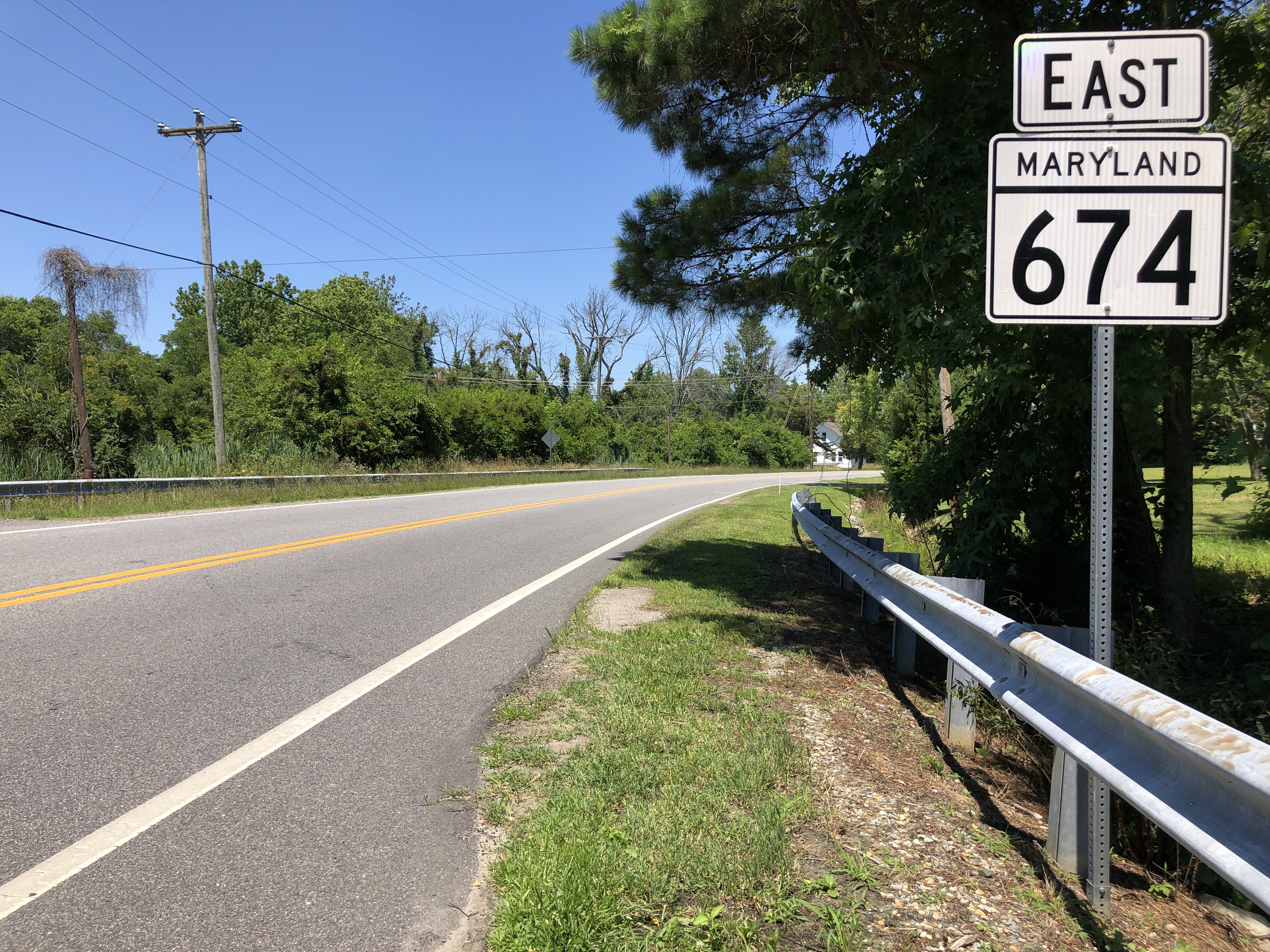
View east along MD 674 in Rock Hall

Maryland Route 674 is the designation for the 0.25-mile-long (0.40 km) portion of Sharp Street from the town limit of Rock Hall at Grays Inn Creek east to MD 20 in western Kent County. MD 674 was constructed along the portion of Sharp Street from Chesapeake Avenue at Sharps Wharf to MD 445 (Main Street) in 1940. The portion of Sharp Street east of MD 445 has been constructed as a concrete road as part of MD 20 in 1920. MD 20 through Rock Hill, including Sharp Street, was widened and resurfaced with bituminous concrete in 1947 and 1948. MD 674 was extended east from MD 445 to its present eastern terminus at MD 20 after MD 20 was relocated onto Rock Hall Avenue east of MD 445 in 1959 and 1960. The portion of the highway west of MD 445 was reconstructed in a streetscape project in 1981 and 1982, and the current length of the highway outside the town was reconstructed similarly in 1989. The town of Rock Hall agreed to assume maintenance for MD 674 west of Grays Inn Creek through a June 14, 1995, road transfer agreement. The transfer was conditional on the state completing a streetscape project on the highway east of MD 445. MD 674 was reduced to its current length after the streetscape project was completed in 1996. MD 674 had an auxiliary route, MD 674A, that served as a 0.08-mile-long (0.13 km) one-way ramp from eastbound MD 674 to MD 20 at the former highway's eastern terminus. MD 674A was assigned to the ramp by 1975, and the route was removed and the roadway abandoned in 1996.

=== References ===
Browse numbered routes
← MD 673	→ MD 675

== MD 694 ==
Maryland Route 694
- Location: Beltsville
- Length: 0.10 mi (160 m)

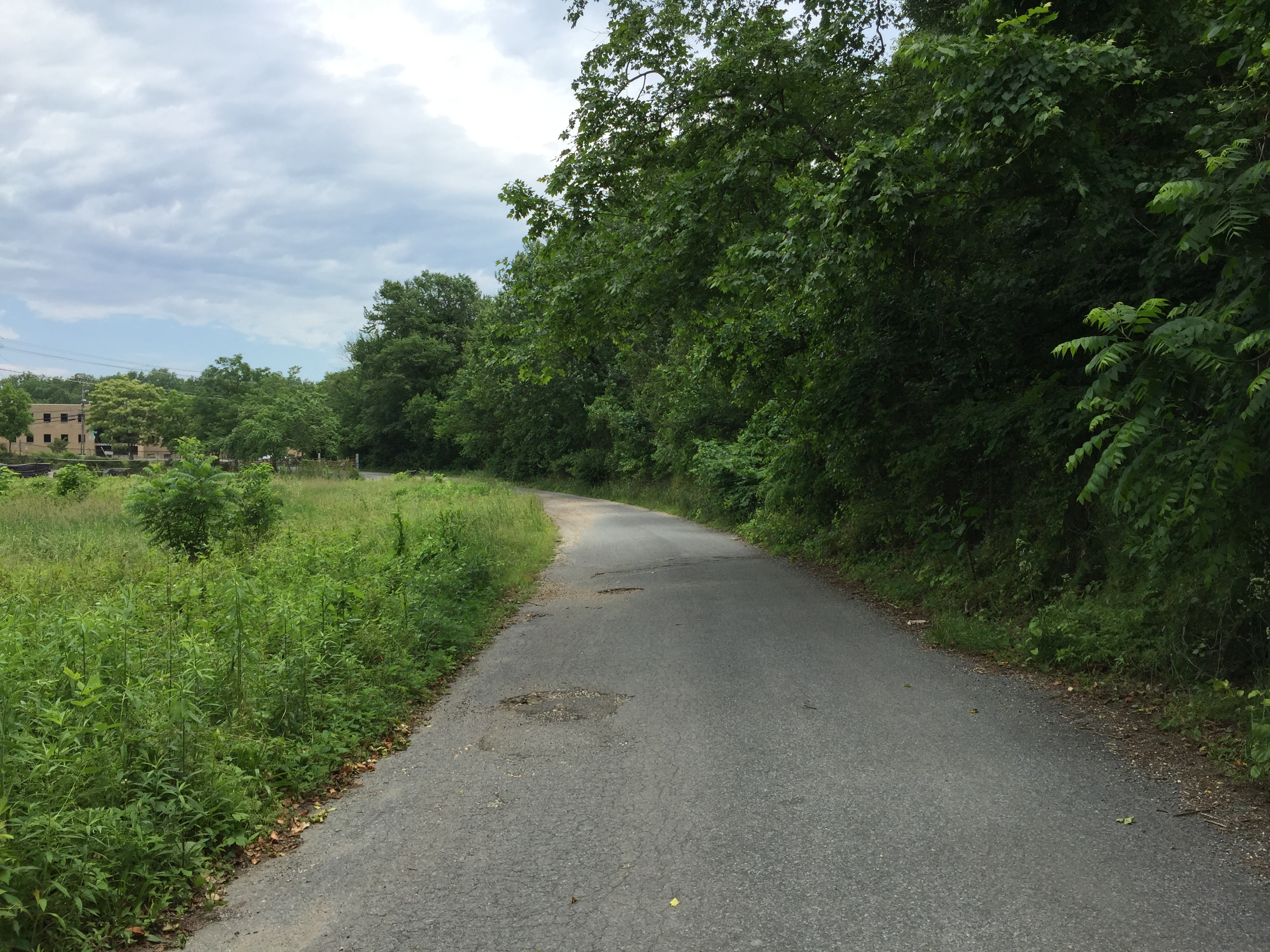
View north along MD 694 in Beltsville

Maryland Route 694 is the unsigned designation for Agricultural Farm Road, a 0.10-mile (0.16 km) service road that extends from MD 212 (officially MD 212A) south to U.S. government property in Beltsville. It could be mistaken as a driveway sometimes.

=== References ===
Browse numbered routes
← MD 675	→ I-695
