= Isle of Wight Wildlife Management Area =

Protected area in Maryland, United States

Coordinates: 38°23′35″N 75°6′26″W

Isle of Wight Wildlife Management Area, Maryland, USA
- IUCN category V (protected landscape/seascape)
- Interactive map of Isle of Wight Wildlife Management Area, Maryland, USA
- Location: Worcester County, Maryland, USA
- Nearest city: Ocean City, Maryland
- Area: 200 acres (0.81 km^{2})
- Governing body: Maryland Department of Natural Resources

Isle of Wight Wildlife Management Area is a state wildlife management area (WMA) of Maryland located on the Isle of Wight, a small peninsula between the St. Martin's River and Isle of Wight Bay in Worcester County. Although called Isle of Wight, a small strip of marsh and road connects it with the mainland.

The WMA is bisected by Maryland Route 90, one of the two principal highway routes into Ocean City. Despite this, the WMA attracts many birds, especially those dependent upon tidal marshes and bays, including great blue herons and green herons, black ducks, buffleheads, scaup, brant, Canada and snow geese, the common loon, and swans.

Although hunting in season is permitted in the WMA, the area south of Route 90 is closed to hunting and is managed as a day use recreation area by Worcester County.
