= Assawoman =

Assawoman may refer to:

- Assawoman, Virginia, United States, an unincorporated community
- Assawoman Bay, a lagoon in Maryland and Delaware, United States
- Assawoman Bay Bridge, a bridge carrying Maryland State Route 90 over Assawoman Bay
- Assawoman Canal, a canal in Sussex County, Delaware, United States
- Assawoman Wildlife Area, a state wildlife area in Sussex County, Delaware
- Little Assawoman Bay, a lagoon in Sussex County, Delaware, United States
