= Isle of Wight (Maryland) =

Island in Worcester County, Maryland, United States

Coordinates: 38°23′40″N 75°06′24″W

Isle of Wight is an island in Worcester County, Maryland. The island is in Isle of Wight Bay at the mouth of St. Martin River just west of Ocean City on Fenwick Island in eastern Maryland. The Ocean City Expressway crosses the island between the mainland and Fenwick Island.

The island notably has the same name as Isle Of Wight, an island in the Solent south of Portsmouth in England.

The island is designated by the state of Maryland as a Wildlife Management Area.
