= Ocean City High School (Maryland) =

Coordinates: 38.3351°N 75.0847°W

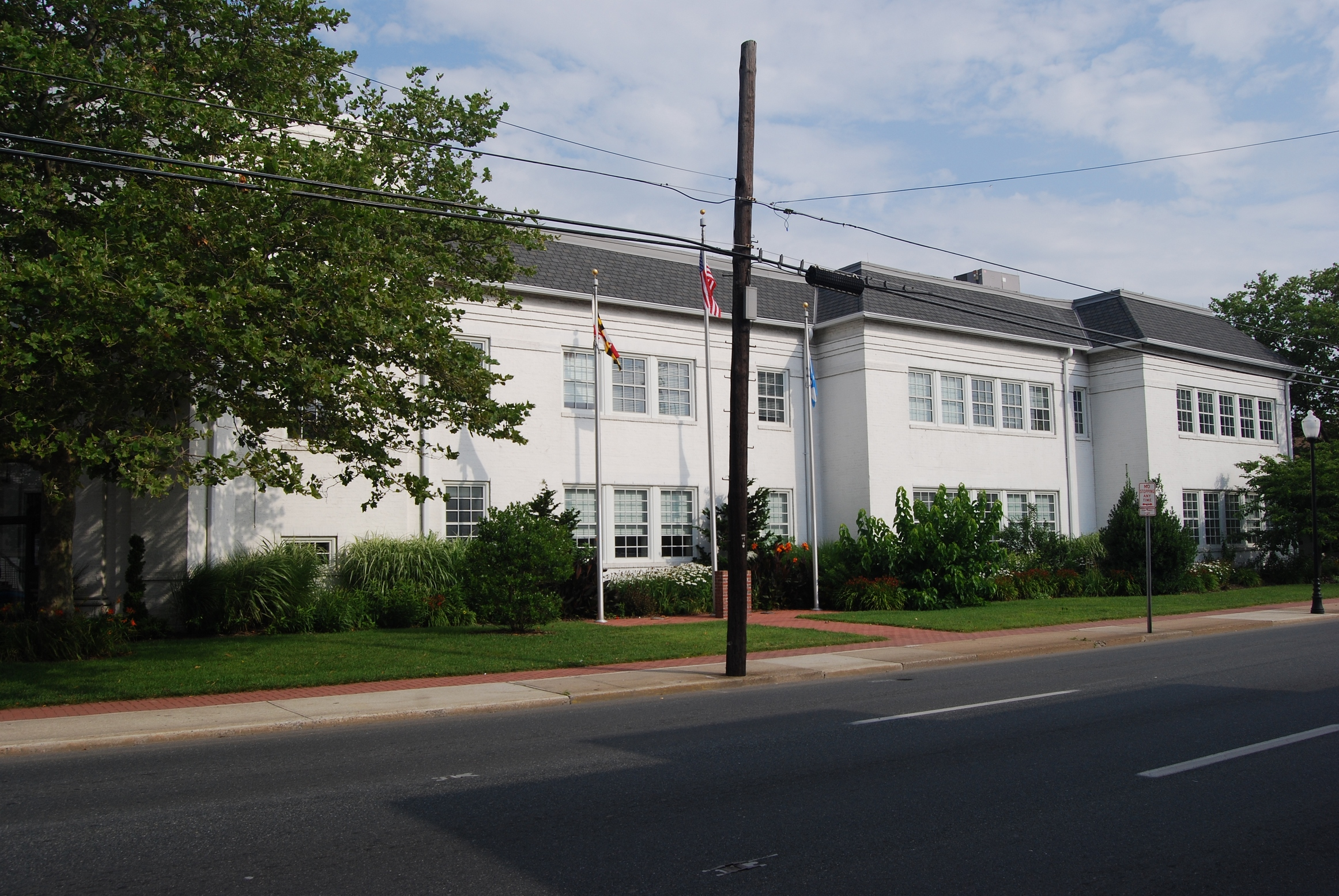
- Former Ocean City High School, now the Ocean City City Hall

Location
- 301 Baltimore Avenue; Ocean City, Maryland 21842; United States

Information
- Type: Public
- Opened: 1917
- Closed: 1955
- School district: Worcester Public Schools
- Grades: 1–12
- Campus: Rural
- Nickname: Vikings

Ocean City High School was a public high school in Ocean City, Maryland, United States.

== Overview ==
The building was constructed in 1915 to serve as a teaching school. In 1917, the building was sold by the state of Maryland to Ocean City and it became the island's first school. It served students from elementary school through high school. The high school students attended classes on the second floor.

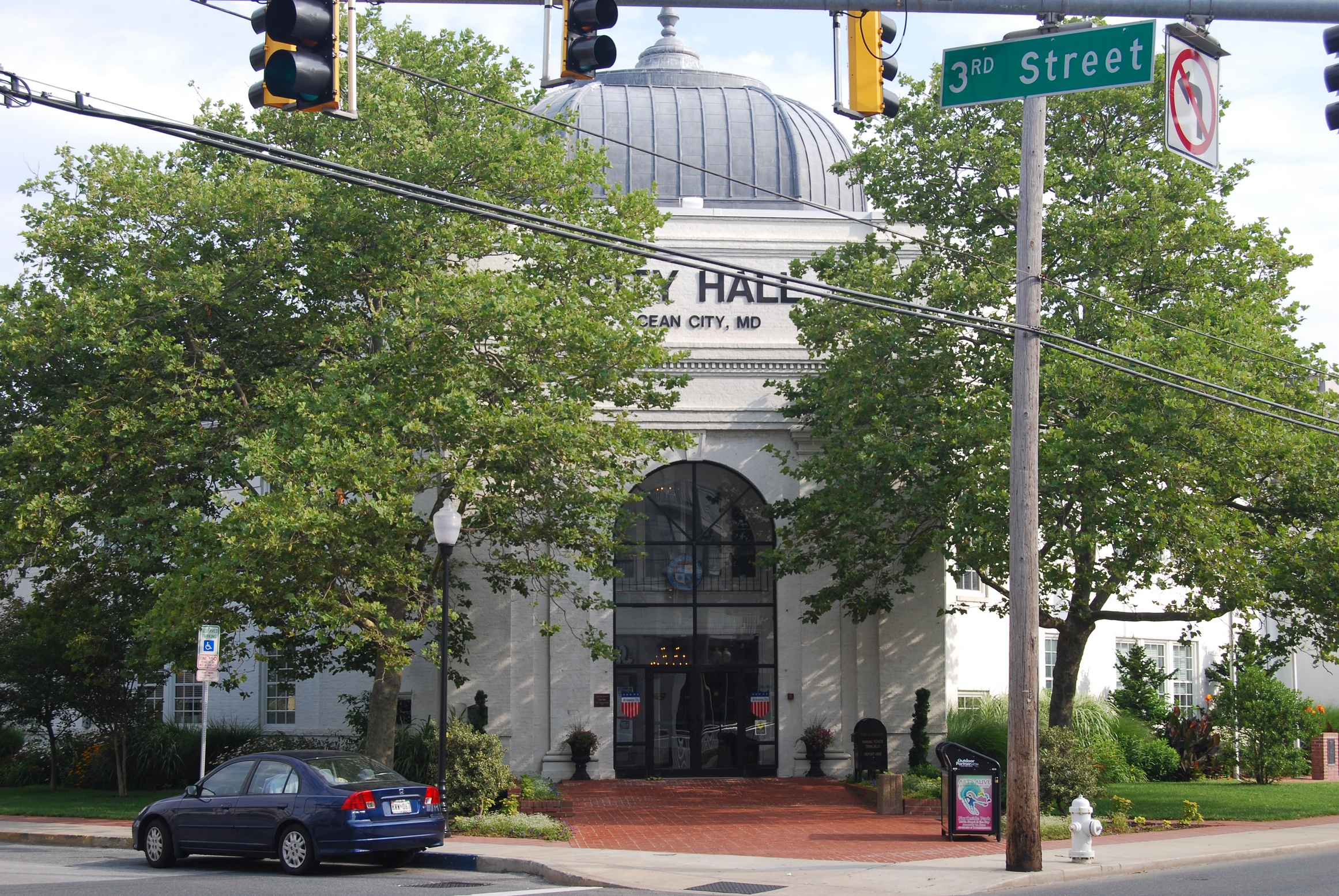
The former Ocean City High School now houses Ocean City's City Hall.

The school remained in operation for 38 years. High school students from Ocean City were bused to the mainland to attend school after Stephen Decatur High School opened. It remained an elementary school for many years until the new elementary school was built in West Ocean City. The building then became City Hall for Ocean City .

The building is located on Maryland 528 and Third Street, four blocks north of the end of U.S. 50. There have since been several additions to the building to accommodate the growing needs of City Hall.

== Sports ==
State Champions

- 1955 - Boys cross country
- 1952 - Boys basketball
- 1952 - Boys cross country

State finalist

- 1951 - Boys basketball
- 1948 - Boys basketball

== See also ==
- For a list of current high schools in Maryland: List of high schools in Maryland
- Worcester County Public Schools
