= Maryland Route 90 =

Highway in Worcester County, Maryland, US

Maryland Route 90
- Ocean City Expressway
- MD 90 highlighted in red

Route information
- Maintained by MDSHA
- Length: 11.83 mi (19.04 km)
- Existed: 1971–present

Major junctions
- West end: US 50 near Whaleyville
- US 113 in Friendship; MD 589 in Ocean Pines
- East end: MD 528 in Ocean City

Location
- Country: United States
- State: Maryland
- Counties: Worcester

Highway system
- Maryland highway system; Interstate; US; State; Scenic Byways
← MD 88	→ MD 91

Maryland Route 90 (MD 90) is a state highway in the U.S. state of Maryland. Known as the Ocean City Expressway, the state highway runs 11.83 miles (19.04 km) from U.S. Route 50 (US 50) near Whaleyville east to MD 528 in Ocean City in Worcester County. MD 90 is a two-lane expressway that provides one of the main access routes to Ocean City, especially the northern part of the resort town, and thus sees heavy seasonal traffic. The highway was constructed from Ocean City starting in 1970. The state highway was opened west to MD 589 in 1972 and to US 113 in 1975. MD 90 was completed west to US 50 in 1976.

== Route description ==
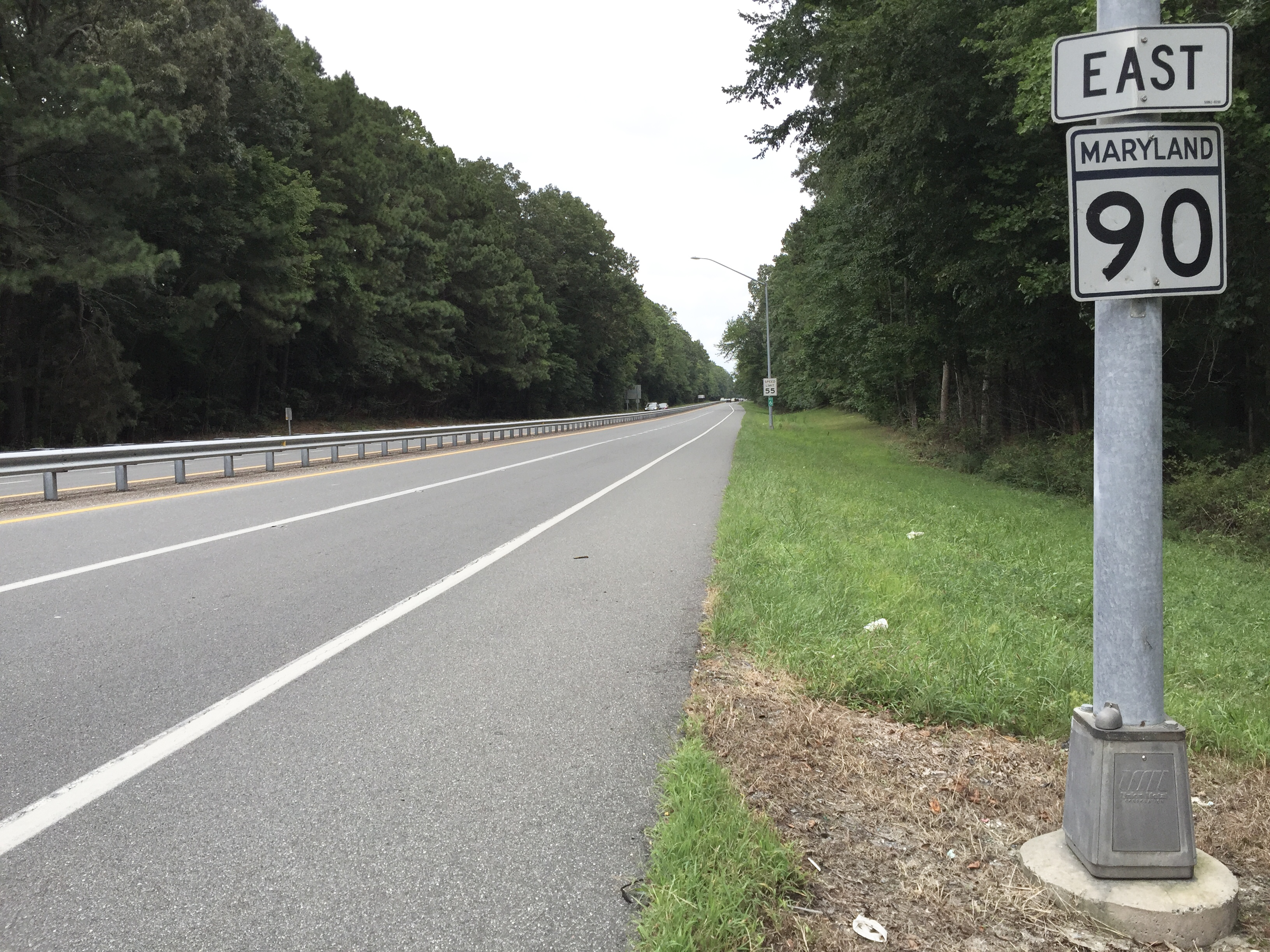
View east along MD 90 at MD 589 in Ocean Pines

MD 90 begins at a partial directional interchange with US 50 (Ocean Gateway) east of Whaleyville. There is no access from westbound MD 90 to eastbound US 50 or from westbound US 50 to eastbound MD 90. MD 90 heads east as a two-lane undivided freeway with rumble strips within the painted median. Headlight use is required at all times. After passing under MD 346 (Old Ocean City Boulevard) with no access, the state highway crosses over Church Branch. MD 90 comes to a bridge over the Snow Hill Line of the Maryland and Delaware Railroad before reaching a partial cloverleaf interchange with US 113 (Worcester Highway). After passing over MD 575 (Worcester Highway), the old alignment of US 113, with no access, the state highway becomes divided with a narrow guardrail median barrier.

MD 90 continues east through Ocean Pines, where the highway has a diamond interchange with MD 589 (Racetrack Road) and passes over Ocean Parkway within that community. The median barrier ends and the state highway becomes an undivided highway again immediately before crossing the St. Martin River on a long bridge. A grass and guardrail median returns right after the bridge ends at Isle of Wight, where MD 90 has an at-grade signalized intersection with St. Martins Neck Road and the entrance to Isle of Wight Nature Park to the south. MD 90 becomes undivided again for the Assawoman Bay Bridge over the Assawoman Bay. After that bridge, the state highway expands to four lanes with a Jersey barrier for a short distance before its terminus at an at-grade signalized intersection with MD 528 (Coastal Highway) at 62nd Street in the Midtown section of Ocean City.

MD 90 serves as an access route to the northern part of Ocean City and sees heavy traffic in the summer months. The route is also designated as a hurricane evacuation route out of Ocean City in which contraflow lane reversal can be used for a quicker evacuation. MD 90 is a part of the main National Highway System for its entire length.

== History ==
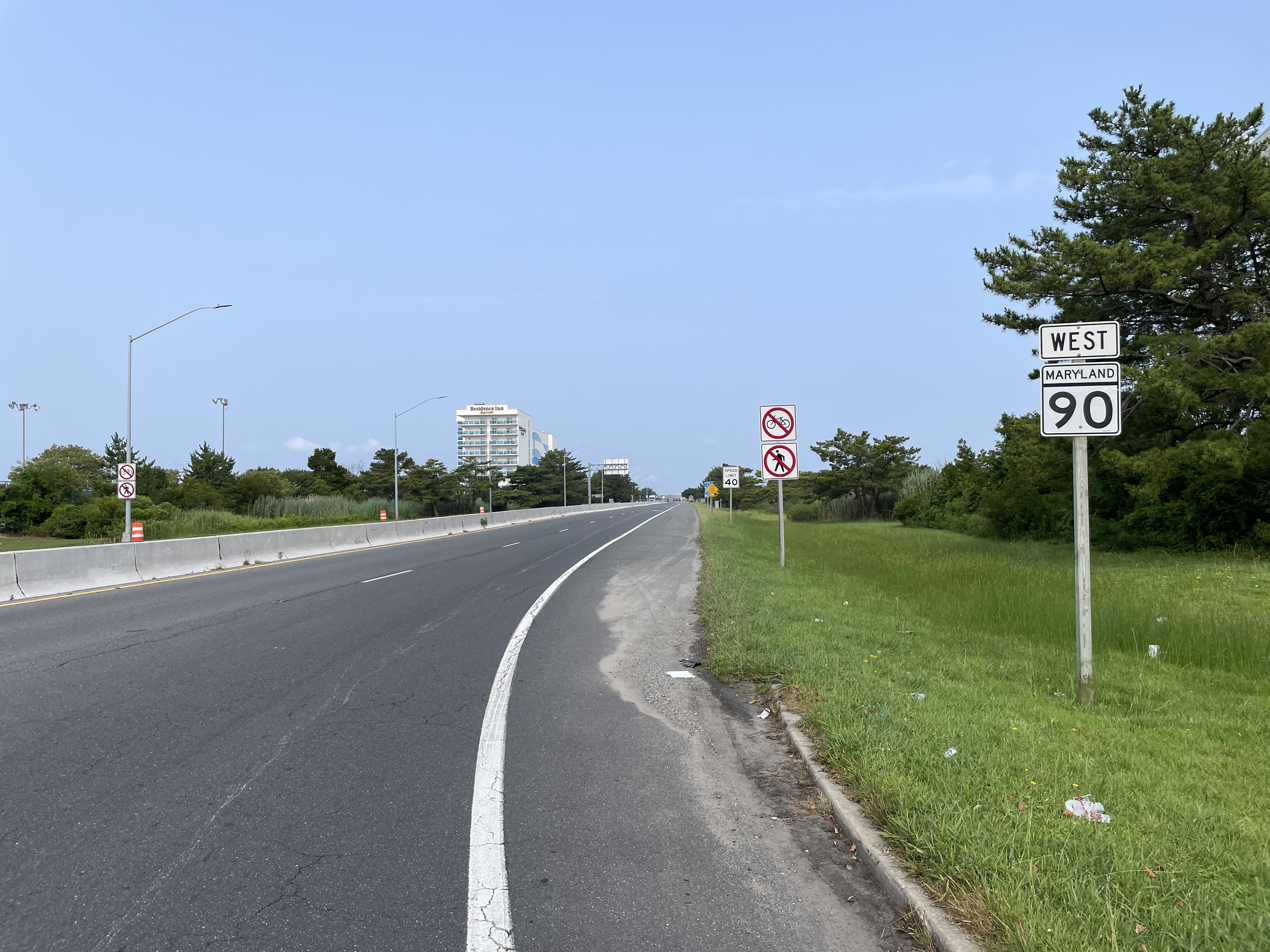
MD 90 westbound past eastern terminus at MD 528 in Ocean City

Construction on MD 90 began in 1970 with the construction of the bridges over the St. Martin River and Assawoman Bay, which were completed in 1970 and 1971, respectively. The state highway was completed and opened between MD 528 and MD 589 in 1972. Construction west to US 113 commenced in 1973 and west to US 50 in 1974. MD 90 was extended west to US 113, which at the time followed current MD 575, in 1975. The state highway was completed when the highway opened between US 50 and US 113 in 1976. MD 90's present interchange with US 113 was constructed in 1976. However, the interchange remained unused until US 113 was relocated as a four-lane divided highway from Berlin north past MD 90 in 2000. The interchange ramp with MD 575 was closed and removed shortly after the new interchange opened.

In 2009, Mayor Rick Meehan of Ocean City pushed for dualization of the MD 90 bridge, stating that it "is the quicker way in and out of town, especially if you look at all the development that has taken place along the Route 50 corridor." He also stated that dualization is good for the route for evacuation purposes. On August 21, 2021, Governor Larry Hogan announced the state would advance plans to improve MD 90 that include widening the entire length of the road to a four-lane dual highway. On June 13, 2022, Governor Hogan announced that $15 million in funding will be dedicated to expand MD 90 as part of the "Reach the Beach" plan. In September 2024, the proposed widening of MD 90 was put on hold due to reductions to the state's transportation budget. In April 2025, the MD 90 widening project was put back on the state's agenda, with preliminary design planned to begin in July 2026.

== Junction list ==
The entire route is in Worcester County.

Location	mi	km	Destinations	Notes
Whaleyville	0.00	0.00	US 50 west (Ocean Gateway) – Salisbury, Bay Bridge	Western terminus; eastbound exit from and westbound entrance to US 50
Friendship	4.03	6.49	US 113 (Worcester Highway) – Berlin, Snow Hill, Dover	Partial cloverleaf interchange; Berlin signed westbound
Ocean Pines	6.01	9.67	MD 589 (Racetrack Road) – Ocean Pines	Diamond interchange
St. Martin River	8.42– 9.21	13.55– 14.82	St. Martin River Bridge	
	9.47	15.24	St. Martins Neck Road north – Bishopville	At-grade signalized intersection
Assawoman Bay	9.94– 11.38	16.00– 18.31	Assawoman Bay Bridge	
Ocean City	11.83	19.04	MD 528 (Coastal Highway) / 62nd Street east	Eastern terminus; at-grade signalized intersection
1.000 mi = 1.609 km; 1.000 km = 0.621 mi: Incomplete access
