= Roland E. Powell Convention Center =

Convention center in Ocean City, Maryland, US

Coordinates: 38.368087°N 75.074028°W

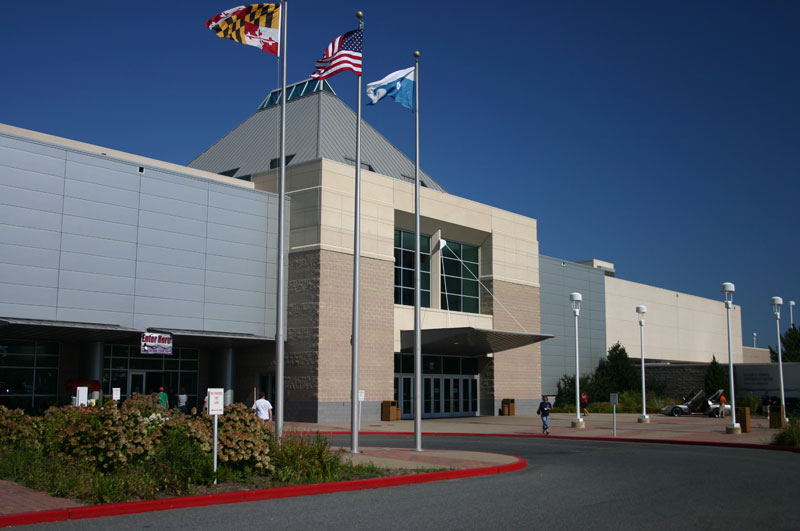
- Interactive map of Roland E. Powell Convention Center
- Location: 4001 Coastal Highway; Ocean City, Maryland 21842
- Owner: Town of Ocean City
- Operator: Town of Ocean City
- Public transit: Ocean City Transportation: Coastal Highway Beach Bus

Construction
- Opened: 1997

The Roland E. Powell Convention Center, also known as the Ocean City Convention Center, is a multi-purpose convention center in Ocean City, Maryland, USA. It contains 214,000 sq ft (20,000 m^{2}) of floor space. It can also be converted into a 5,000 seat indoor arena that can host sporting events, like wrestling, as well as concerts. It is named after former mayor of Ocean City, Roland E. Powell. Food and beverage, catering, and special event services are provided by Centerplate.
