= Isle of Wight Bay =

- Location within Maryland Location within the United States
- Location: Worcester County, Maryland
- Coordinates: 38°22′18″N 75°05′51″W
- Type: Bay

Isle of Wight Bay is a lagoon that separates part of mainland Worcester County, Maryland from the midtown part of Ocean City, also in Worcester County. To the north, it connects to the Assawoman Bay just south of the Assawoman Bay Bridge, and to the south it connects to the Sinepuxent Bay at the north end of West Ocean City where the bay narrows between the Thoroughfare channel and Mallard Island. The major tributary of Isle of Wight Bay is the St. Martin's River; other tributaries include Turville Creek, Manklin Creek, and Herring Creek.
