= Ocean City Transportation =

Public transportation agency in Maryland, United States

- Parent: Town of Ocean City Public Works Department
- Headquarters: 204 65th Street; Ocean City, MD 21842
- Service area: Ocean City, Maryland
- Service type: Bus service
- Routes: 2
- Website: https://oceancitymd.gov/oc/departments/public-works/transportation/

Ocean City Transportation is a public transit agency serving the beach town of Ocean City in Worcester County, Maryland in the United States. The agency is a division of the town's Public Works Department. Ocean City Transportation offers bus service branded as Beach Bus and paratransit service called ADA Para Transit.

== Services ==
=== Beach Bus ===
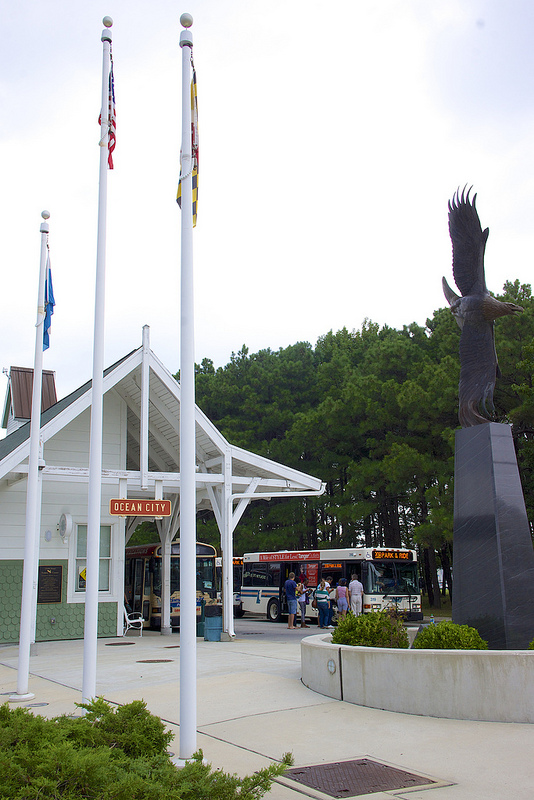
North End Transit Center at 144th Street near the Delaware line

Ocean City Transportation operates two regular bus routes serving Ocean City, the Coastal Highway Beach Bus and the West Ocean City Park-N-Ride Beach Bus, along with the Express Beach Bus for special events. The Coastal Highway Beach Bus runs the entire length of the city 24 hours a day, 7 days a week on a year-round basis. The bus begins at the South Division Street Transit Center near the Ocean City Inlet and follows Baltimore Avenue northbound and Philadelphia Avenue southbound through downtown Ocean City to 15th Street. From here, the Beach Bus follows Philadelphia Avenue north to 33rd Street and continues north along Coastal Highway to 145th Street near the Delaware border, reaching its northern terminus at the 144th Street Transit Center. During the summer season, the city hires additional operators for the highest periods of ridership. These seasonal bus drivers are frequently retirees from other transit authorities as well as school bus drivers across the state of Maryland who are off during the summer season while schools are not in session.

The West Ocean City Park-N-Ride Beach Bus provides a park and ride service into Ocean City from the West Ocean City Park and Ride. Patrons can park their cars at the Park and Ride's lot in West Ocean City off U.S. Route 50 and take the bus into the city to connect with the Coastal Highway Beach Bus at the South Division Street Transit Center. This service also serves the Outlets Ocean City in West Ocean City. The West Ocean City Park-N-Ride Beach Bus operates in May for the Springfest and OC Cruisin' weekends, daily between Memorial Day weekend and Labor Day weekend, and in September for the Bikefest and Sunfest weekends. Service runs from 6 a.m. to 2 a.m, with service ending at 10 p.m. on the Sunday of the Springfest OC Cruisin', Bikefest, and Sunfest weekends.

The Express Beach Bus provides service for special events during the summer, providing service to events from remote parking areas. During the Springfest weekend in May, service is provided from Roland E. Powell Convention Center parking lot to the Springfest Fair grounds. For the OC Airshow in June, buses operate from the West Ocean City Park and Ride to 17th Street and Baltimore Avenue. During the White Marlin Open in August, service is provided from Roland E. Powell Convention Center parking lot to Jacqueline Avenue and 14th Street. For the Sunfest weekend in September, buses operate from the Roland E. Powell Convention Center to the Sunfest Fair grounds.

Ocean City Transportation buses offer connections to Shore Transit buses to lower Eastern Shore points at the West Ocean City Park and Ride in the summer and the South Division Street Transit Center in the offseason. Between May and September, DART First State's Beach Bus Route 208 bus connects the Coastal Highway Beach Bus at the 144th Street Transit Center with the Delaware Beaches.

=== ADA Para Transit ===
Ocean City Transportation offers paratransit service called ADA Para Transit, which provides door-to-door service for disabled residents and visitors. Paratransit service is available during the same hours the Coastal Highway Beach Bus operates through advance reservations. MEDTRN service is offered on Monday, Wednesday, and Friday to Ocean City residents to provide round-trip service to and from medical appointments in Salisbury, Pocomoke City, Cambridge, Baltimore, and Philadelphia by way of Shore Transit.

== Fleet ==
The Ocean City Transportation bus fleet consists mainly of ElDorado National buses, as well as a handful of New Flyer buses. They also formerly operated Thomas Built Buses CL960 model and the TL960 model, both in 40-foot (12 m) lengths, Blue Bird Xcel 102s in a 40-foot (12 m) length, and ElDorado National XHF buses in a 35-foot (11 m) length. In past years, Ocean City received somewhere about 10-17 articulated buses that were retired by MTA Maryland, which were built by North American Bus Industries in 1995-96. The buses were frequently borrowed every summer to maintain the increase in ridership and crowding of their current 40-foot vehicles.

Image	Builder and model name	Model year	Length	Numbers (Total)	Amount in service	Energy source	Engine/Transmission	Notes
	ElDorado National; Axess	2011-2013	40 ft (12 m)	2109–2135 (27 buses)	27	Diesel	Cummins ISL9; Allison B400R	2109–2122 are 2011 models.; 2123–2126 are 2012 models.; 2127–2135 are 2013 models.
	New Flyer; Xcelsior XD60	2016	60 ft (18 m)	2136–2137 (2 buses)	2	Diesel	Cummins ISL9; Allison B500R	
	ENC; Axess	2018	40 ft (12 m)	2138–2141, 2147–2153 (11 buses)	11	Diesel	Cummins L9; Allison B400R	
	New Flyer; DE60LFR	2008	60 ft (18 m)	2159–2161,2165-2166 (5 buses)	5	Diesel-electric hybrid	Cummins ISL; Allison EP-50 Hybrid system	Ex. MTA Maryland buses, acquired in 2021 due to overcrowding on the Coastal Highway route.; 2159 is Ex. 08027; 2160 is Ex. 08001; 2161 is Ex. 08030; 2165 is Ex. 08008; 2166 is Ex. 08013
	New Flyer; Xcelsior XD60	2022	60 ft (18 m)	2162–2164 (3 buses)	3	Diesel	Cummins L9; Allison B500R	
	New Flyer; Xcelsior XD60		60 ft (18 m)	2024	2157–2158 2167-2168 (4 buses)	Diesel	Cummins L9; Allison B500R	4

=== Retired fleet ===
Year	Builder and model name	Numbers	Year Retired	Picture	Engine/Transmission	Notes
1995	Thomas; CL960	200		1995 Thomas CL960 Citiliner Bus Conversion 1995 Thomas CL960 Transit Bus, Kiwanis Club Field Trip Bus	Caterpillar 3116	To our knowledge this was the first "Beach Express" in Ocean City. In retirement, first used as Kiwanis Club field trip bus (Tattnall County, GA). Current Owners- Christopher Griffis and Courtney Morris purchased and converted the bus into an RV named "EXPRESS YOURSELF" located in Florida. (Accurate as of 4/10/2023)
2003	Motor Coach Industries; D4500	200	2018		Detroit Diesel Series 60; Allison B500R	
1997-2001	Thomas; CL960	205–228, 233–235	2011-2016		Caterpillar 3126 Allison B400R	
2002-2003	Thomas; TL960	239–242, 247–250	2016-2017		Caterpillar 3126 Allison B400R	
2005	ElDorado National; Transmark RE 35	260–267	2020		Cummins ISL; Allison B300R	
2007	Blue Bird Corporation; Xcel102	2101–2108	2019		Cummins ISC; Allison B400R	
