= Assawoman Bay Bridge =

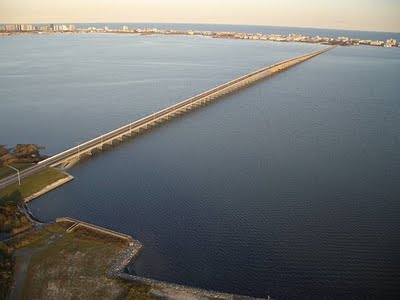
- Assawoman Bay Bridge
- Coordinates: 38°23′17″N 75°5′14″W
- Carries: 2 lanes of MD 90
- Crosses: Assawoman Bay crossing the Assawoman Bay in Maryland's Eastern Shore, U.S.
- Locale: Ocean City, Maryland, U.S.
- Maintained by: Maryland State Highway Administration
- ID number: 1. 23021

Characteristics
- Design: Box girder bridge

Statistics
- Daily traffic: 18,062

The Assawoman Bay Bridge is a bridge that crosses the Assawoman Bay in Ocean City, Maryland. The bridge carries Maryland Route 90, a freeway, into northern Ocean City, Maryland. The bridge consists of two lanes and is undivided, but it is heavily travelled. In the summer, it is usually congested with traffic heading into and out of Ocean City, especially on Fridays and Sundays. It ends in North Ocean City at Maryland Route 528 (Coastal Highway) and 62nd Street.
