= Assawoman Bay =

Lagoon near Ocean City, Maryland, US

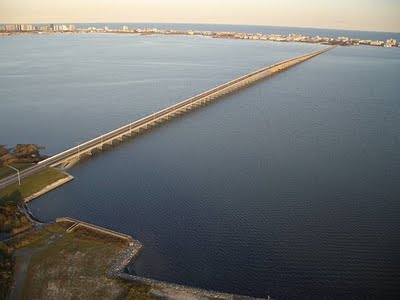
- The Assawoman Bay with the Assawoman Bay Bridge crossing it. Ocean City and the Atlantic Ocean can be seen in the background.

- Location within Maryland Location within the United States
- Coordinates: 38°25′N 75°05′W

Assawoman Bay (locally /ˈæsəwʊmən/), once called Assawoman Sound, is a lagoon that is located between Ocean City, Maryland and mainland Delmarva. The bay is located on the northern end of the city, and the bay on the southern end is called the Isle of Wight Bay. The name "Assawoman Bay" comes from the Algonquian meaning "midway fishing stream".

Another bay called Little Assawoman Bay extends into southern Delaware, and is geologically separated from the main estuaries, by a narrow strait locally referred to as "The Ditch" which crosses the Transpeninsular Line. The larger bay is sometimes called "Big Assawoman Bay", to distinguish it from the smaller bay, though this is often meant to be a tongue-in-cheek rendering of the name.

The health of the bay is impacted by urban development of the surrounding watershed, in Delaware and Ocean City. The bay is known for its recreational activities, notably for anglers.
