= Maryland Route 528 =

Highway in Maryland

Maryland Route 528
- MD 528 highlighted in red; MD 378 in blue

Route information
- Maintained by MDSHA
- Length: 9.04 mi (14.55 km)
- Existed: 1933–present
- Tourist routes: Cape to Cape Scenic Byway

Major junctions
- South end: MD 378 in Ocean City
- US 50 in Ocean City; MD 90 in Ocean City
- North end: DE 1 at the Delaware state line in Fenwick Island, DE

Location
- Country: United States
- State: Maryland
- Counties: Worcester

Highway system
- Maryland highway system; Interstate; US; State; Scenic Byways
← MD 526	→ MD 529
← MD 377	MD 378	→ MD 380

Maryland Route 528 (MD 528) is a state highway in the U.S. state of Maryland. Known for most of its length as Coastal Highway, the state highway runs 9.04 miles (14.55 km) from the southern terminus of its companion route, Maryland Route 378 (MD 378), in downtown Ocean City north to the Delaware state line at the northern edge of the resort town, where the highway continues as Delaware Route 1 (DE 1). MD 528 and MD 378 are the primary north–south streets of Ocean City, where they provide access to countless hotels, condos, restaurants, shops, and other businesses catering to tourists. These highways experience heavy seasonal traffic and provide access to hurricane evacuation routes, which include U.S. Route 50 (US 50), MD 90, and DE 54. Both Baltimore Avenue and Philadelphia Avenue date back to the founding of Ocean City in the late 19th century. MD 378 was assigned to Baltimore Avenue in 1927 and MD 528 was assigned to Philadelphia Avenue in 1933. MD 528 was extended north of 15th Street to the Delaware state line in 1939. Both highways were rebuilt and widened in the 1950s. MD 528 was expanded to a six-lane divided highway north of the one-way pair in the late 1980s.

== Route description ==
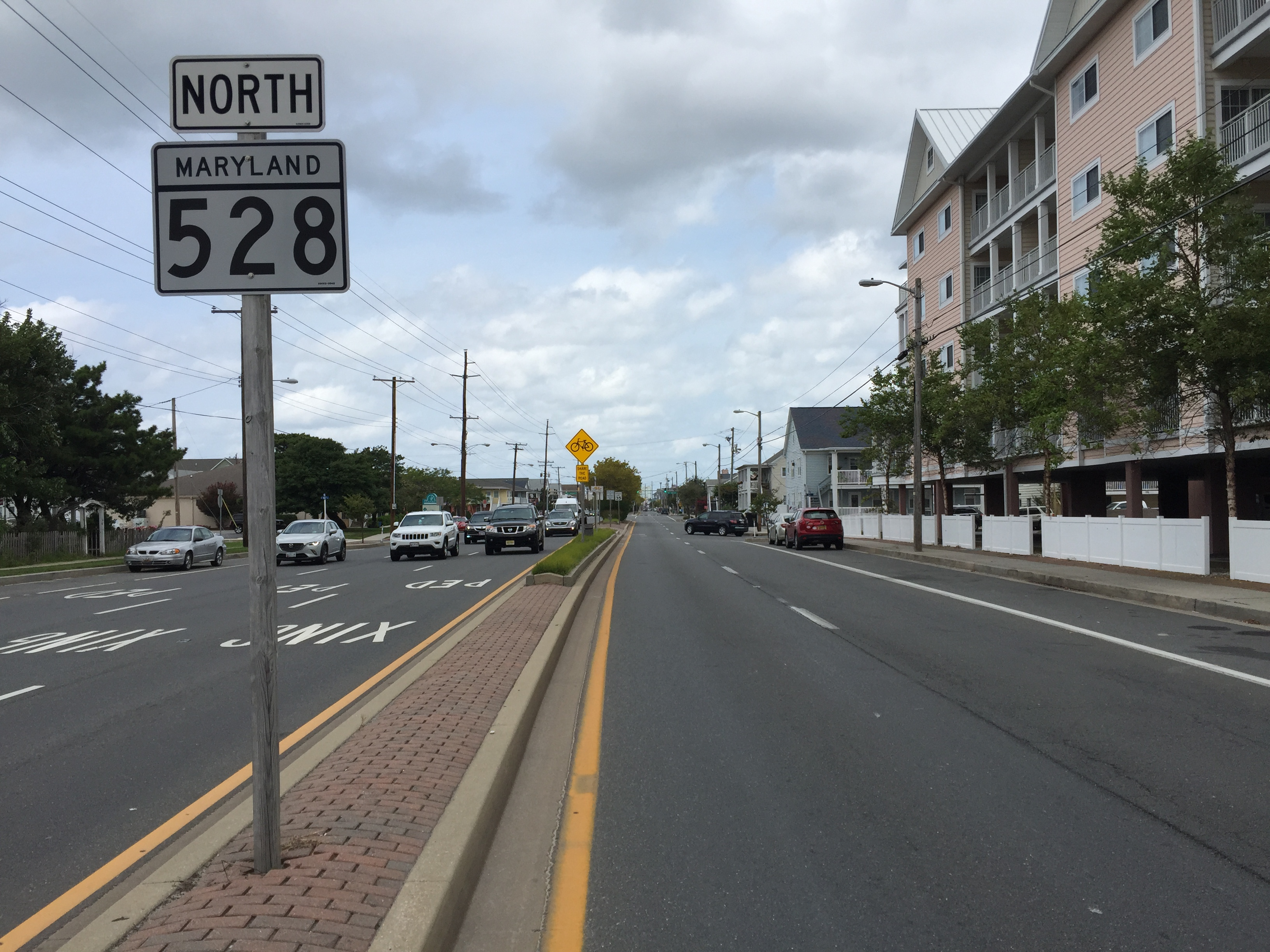
View north along MD 528 at 9th Street in southern Ocean City

MD 528 and MD 378 both have their southern termini at the intersection of Baltimore Avenue and South 1st Street at the southern end of Ocean City north of the Ocean City Inlet. Baltimore Avenue continues south and then turns east as South 2nd Street toward the Hugh T. Cropper Inlet Parking Lot that serves attractions on the Ocean City Boardwalk along the Atlantic Ocean, including the Trimper's Rides amusement park and the Ocean City Life-Saving Station. From the southern terminus, MD 528 heads west on South 1st Street and then north as Philadelphia Avenue, while MD 378 heads north as Baltimore Avenue. The two state highways form a one-way pair, with MD 378 carrying three lanes of northbound traffic and MD 528 carrying three lanes of southbound traffic. Both streets intersect South Division Street, which was the site of the railroad terminus in Ocean City and is currently the site of Sunset Park and the South Division Street Transit Center, and Worcester Street, which was the site of the first automobile bridge to the resort in 1916.

MD 528 and MD 378 head north through the downtown area of Ocean City, where they meet the eastern terminus of US 50 at North Division Street. North Division Street between MD 528 and MD 378 is one-way eastbound, so traffic coming from the south uses North 1st Street, which is one-way westbound and designated MD 378A, to access US 50 west. MD 528 and MD 378 continue north to 9th Street, which is one-way westbound and designated MD 378B. MD 528 becomes two-way at 9th Street. MD 378 continues north as a two-lane street northbound to 15th Street, where the state highway turns west to reach its northern terminus at MD 528. Baltimore Avenue continues north of 15th Street as a two-way municipal street to its northern end at 33rd Street.

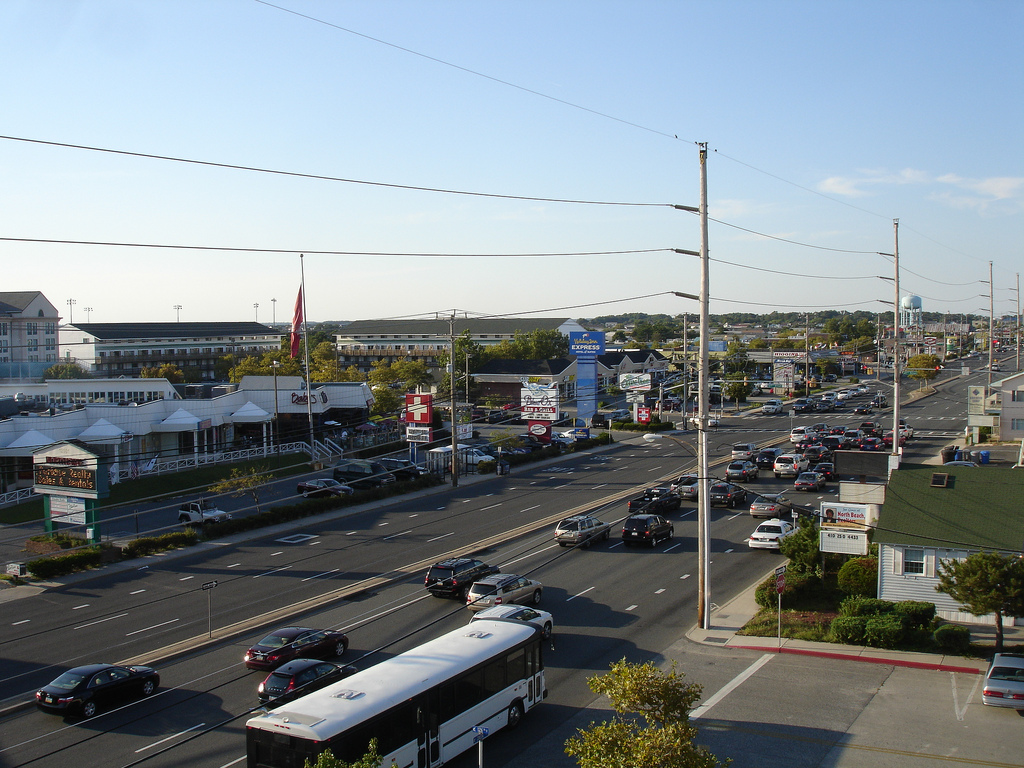
MD 528 looking north toward the intersection with 127th Street in northern Ocean City

MD 528 continues north from 9th Street as a divided highway with two lanes northbound and three lanes southbound. The state highway gains a third lane northbound at MD 378 (15th Street). At 17th Street, MD 528 assumes its form for the remainder of its course to the Delaware state line: three lanes in each direction plus a continuous combined right turn, bus, and bicycle lane in both directions. The road heads into the Midtown section of Ocean City, which is home to numerous restaurants and nightlife, at 28th Street. After passing east of the Jolly Roger Amusement Park at 30th Street, MD 528 meets 33rd Street, which is one-way westbound coming from the northern end of Baltimore Avenue. North of 33rd Street, MD 528 becomes Coastal Highway, the only through highway on the barrier island that is lined with numerous hotels and businesses. The state highway passes east of the Roland E. Powell Convention Center at 40th Street and intersects the eastern terminus of MD 90 (Ocean City Expressway) at 62nd Street. MD 528 continues through commercial areas and heads into North Ocean City at 91st Street, where it passes numerous condos along with the Gold Coast Mall at 112th Street. Farther north, the route runs past more businesses and hotels, heading east of the 144th Street Transit Center before it reaches the Delaware state line at 146th Street, two blocks east of the Fenwick Island Light. Coastal Highway continues into Fenwick Island as DE 1, which meets the eastern terminus of DE 54 one block north of the state line. Throughout Ocean City, MD 528 serves as the divider between the Bayside area to the west and the Oceanside area to the east.

As the main north-south road in Ocean City, MD 528 experiences heavy traffic in the summer months as the resort town sees a large number of visitors and seasonal residents. The route also provides access to hurricane evacuation routes leading out of Ocean City, including US 50, MD 90, and DE 54. MD 528 is a part of the main National Highway System from US 50 to the Delaware state line.

== History ==
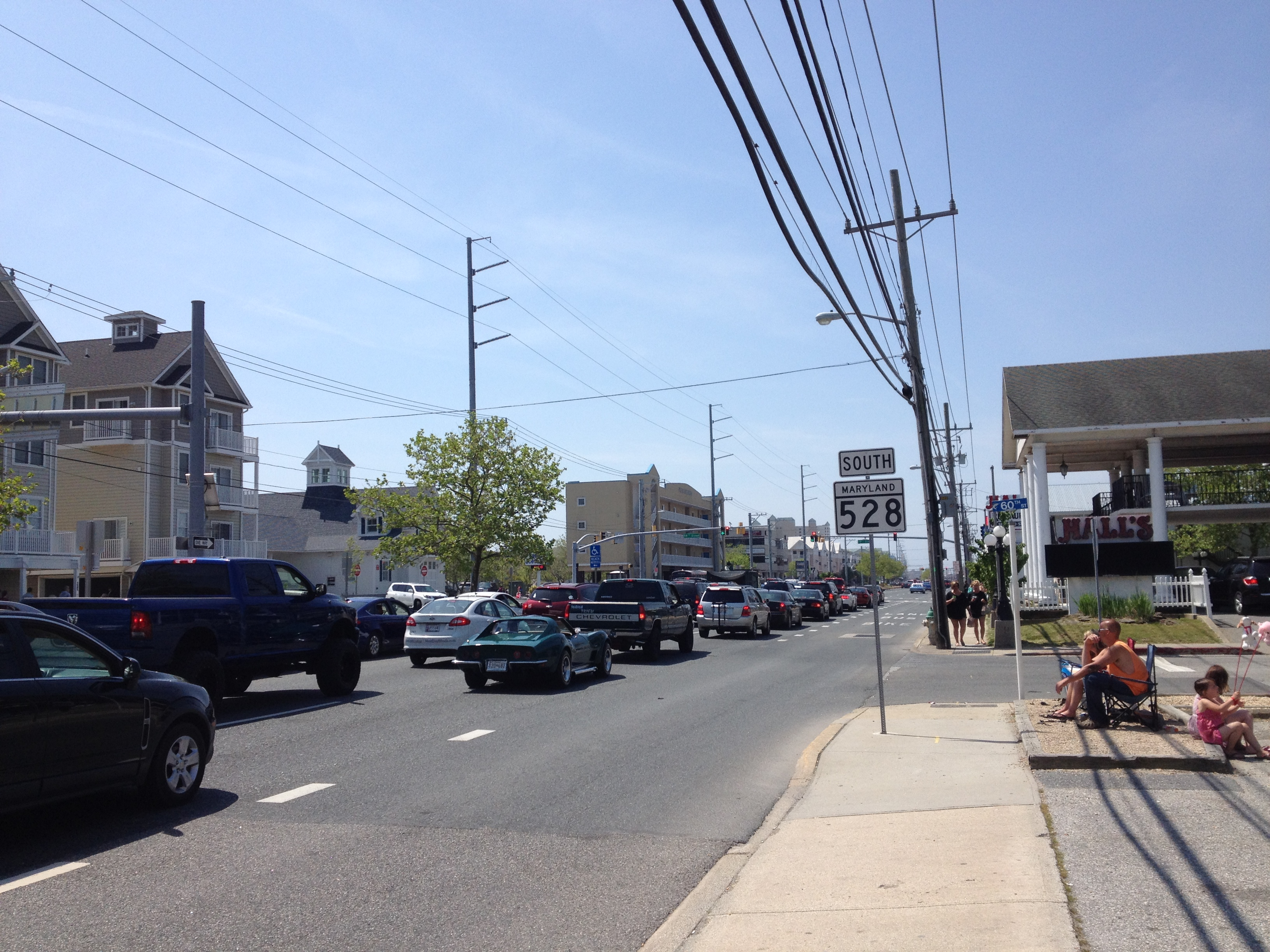
MD 528 southbound past MD 90 in the middle part of Ocean City

Baltimore Avenue and Philadelphia Avenue date back to the founding of Ocean City in 1875. Both avenues originally extended from South Division Street to North Division Street. The streets were later extended north as far as 15th Street. Baltimore Avenue served as the main thoroughfare of Ocean City until Philadelphia Avenue and Coastal Highway assumed predominance in the 1950s. MD 378 was assigned to Baltimore Avenue, which was paved from US 213 (Worcester Street) to 15th Street by 1927. MD 528 was assigned to Philadelphia Avenue when that street was rebuilt between US 213 and 15th Street in 1933. MD 528 was extended north to the Delaware state line when Coastal Highway was completed in 1939.

In the 1940s, traffic in Ocean City increased so much there was a movement to make Baltimore and Philadelphia Avenues one-way in the downtown area, a change that was implemented by 1948. Traffic volume in Ocean City increased even more following the completion of the Chesapeake Bay Bridge in 1952, leading to expansion of the city's north–south arterials. MD 378 was widened along its entire length in 1951 and 1952. MD 528 was widened to four lanes along its entire length in 1953 and 1954. Both state highways were extended to their present southern termini at that time. The first portion of MD 528 to be expanded to a divided highway was around the intersection with MD 90; the highway between 60th and 63rd Streets was reconstructed by 1978. Two sections of six-lane divided highway were completed around 1989: from 25th Street to 65th Street, and from 85th Street to 122nd Street. By 1991, MD 528 was divided highway from 25th Street to the Delaware state line. The segment of Philadelphia Avenue from 9th Street to 25th Street was changed from a five- to six-lane highway with a center turn lane to a divided highway in 2001.

A pedestrian safety project aimed to reduce jaywalking installed a dune-style fence in the median of MD 528, with the first phase taking place between 41st Street/Convention Center Drive and MD 90. Construction on the first phase was expected to begin in January 2017 and be finished by Memorial Day of that year, but was delayed after the only bid came in over the $4.5 million budget. Construction on the first phase began on November 7, 2017 and was completed in May 2018. The second phase will build the fence between 26th Street and 41st Street/Convention Center Drive while the third phase will construct the fence between 9th Street and 26th Street. In the future, the fence will be built between MD 90 and the Delaware border.

== Junction list ==
The entire route is in Ocean City, Worcester County.

mi	km	Destinations	Notes
0.00	0.00	MD 378 north (Baltimore Avenue) – Inlet Parking Lot	Southern terminus of one-way pair formed by MD 528 (southbound) on Philadelphia Avenue and unsigned MD 378 (northbound) on Baltimore Avenue
0.43	0.69	US 50 (North Division Street) – Salisbury	US 50 is one-way eastbound east of MD 528; eastern terminus of westbound US 50
0.53	0.85	1st Street	1st Street east of MD 528 is unsigned MD 378A; one-way westbound
1.08	1.74	9th Street	MD 528 becomes two-way at this intersection; 9th Street east of MD 528 is unsigned MD 378B; one-way westbound
1.47	2.37	MD 378 (15th Street)	Northern terminus of MD 378; portion of MD 378 on 15th Street is one-way westbound
2.65	4.26	33rd Street	33rd Street is one-way westbound east of MD 528
4.33	6.97	MD 90 west (Ocean City Expressway) – Salisbury, Bay Bridge	Eastern terminus of MD 90
9.04	14.55	DE 1 north (Coastal Highway) to DE 54 west (Lighthouse Road)	Continuation into Delaware
1.000 mi = 1.609 km; 1.000 km = 0.621 mi

== Related routes ==
Maryland Route 378
- Location: Ocean City
- Length: 1.49 mi (2.40 km)
- Tourist routes: Cape to Cape Scenic Byway

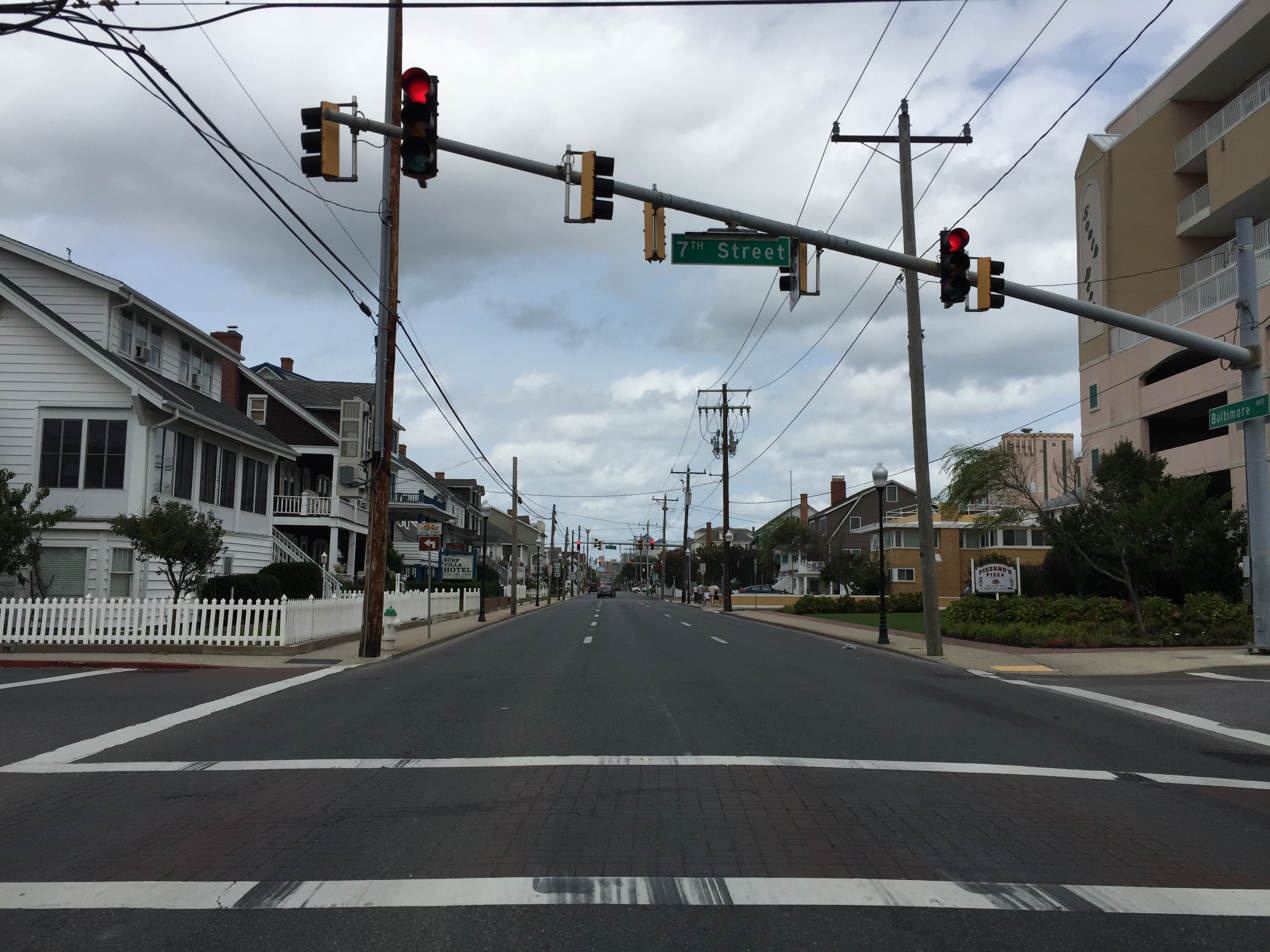
View north along MD 378 at 7th Street in southern Ocean City

Maryland Route 378 is a 1.49-mile (2.40 km) highway in Ocean City that follows portions of Baltimore Avenue and 15th Street from the southern terminus of MD 528 at the southern end of Ocean City north to MD 528 north of the downtown area of Ocean City. Because MD 378 essentially functions as the northbound direction of MD 528 in downtown Ocean City, the state highway is covered in more detail in the main sections of this article. Signage was added to MD 378 in the fall of 2025. MD 378 has two auxiliary routes:

- MD 378A is the designation for 1st Street, a 0.07-mile (0.11 km) connector between MD 378 and MD 528 just north of US 50 in Ocean City. The state highway is one-way westbound, helping provide access to US 50 from traffic at the southern end of the barrier island.
- MD 378B is the designation for 9th Street, a 0.07-mile (0.11 km) connector between MD 378 and MD 528 on the northern edge of downtown Ocean City. MD 378B, which is one-way westbound, serves as the main conduit for MD 378 traffic headed for the central and northern parts of Ocean City along MD 528, connecting with MD 528 at the point the highway becomes two-way. For that reason, MD 378B is part of the National Highway System.

MD 378 from US 50 to MD 378B and all of MD 378B are part of the main National Highway System.

Junction list
The entire route is in Ocean City, Worcester County.

mi	km	Destinations	Notes
0.00	0.00	MD 528 (South 1st Street) / Baltimore Avenue south	Southern terminus of one-way pair formed by MD 528 (southbound) on Philadelphia Avenue and MD 378 (northbound) on Baltimore Avenue
0.39	0.63	US 50 (North Division Street)	US 50 is one-way eastbound west of MD 378; eastern terminus of eastbound US 50
0.47	0.76	1st Street to US 50	1st Street west of MD 378 is MD 378A; one-way westbound
1.02	1.64	9th Street to MD 528	9th Street west of MD 378 is unsigned MD 378B; one-way westbound
1.49	2.40	MD 528 (Philadelphia Avenue) / 15th Street west	Northern terminus of MD 378
1.000 mi = 1.609 km; 1.000 km = 0.621 mi
