= Ocean City Life-Saving Station =

Coordinates: 38°19′32″N 75°5′17″W

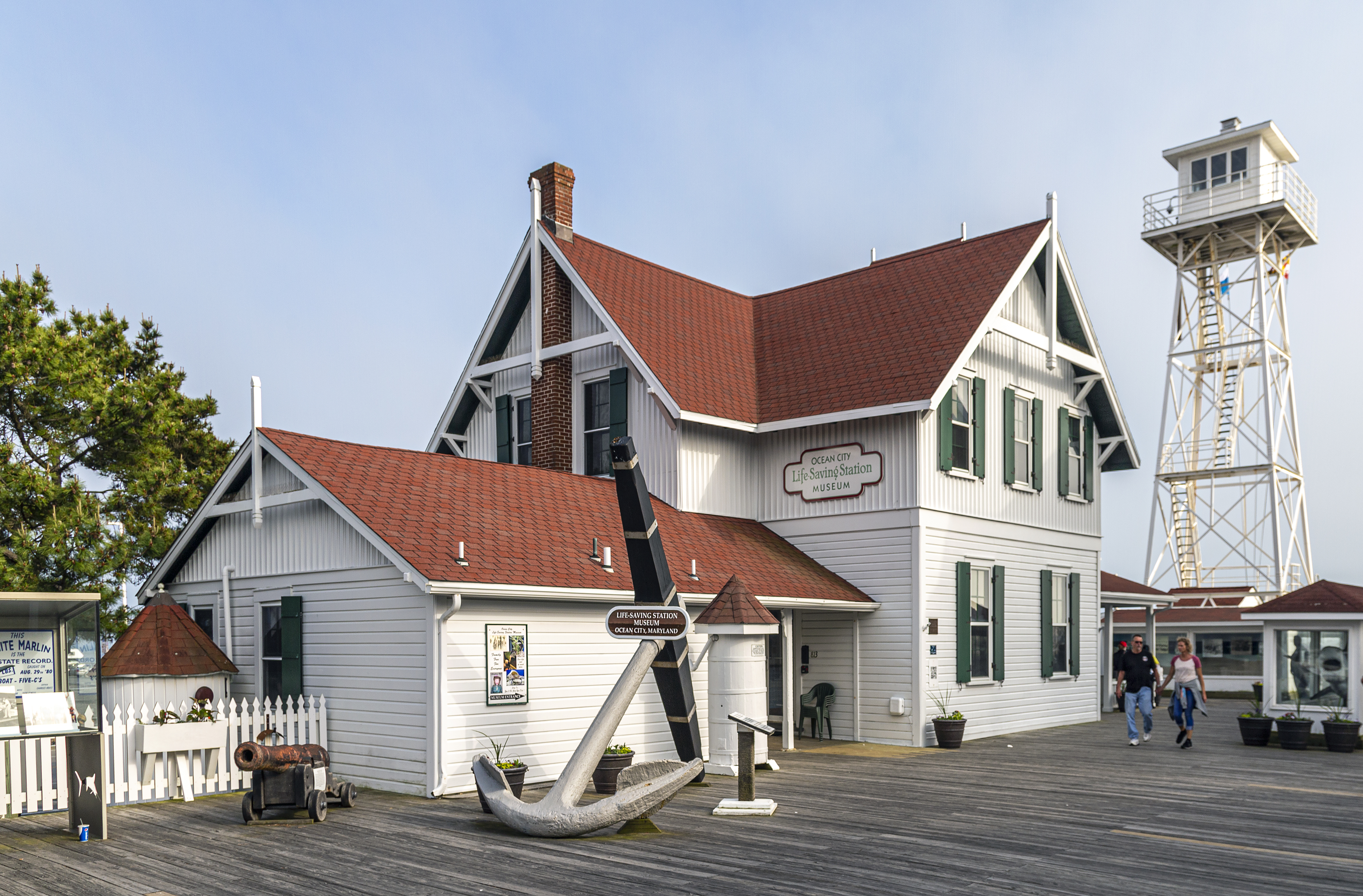
- Ocean City Life-Saving Station
- Interactive map of the Ocean City Life-Saving Station area

General information
- Location: Boardwalk at the Inlet; Ocean City, Maryland, United States
- Completed: 1891

Website
- www.ocmuseum.org

The Ocean City Life-Saving Station is located on the Boardwalk at the Inlet, Ocean City, Maryland, United States. The Ocean City Life-Saving Station was built in 1891 and was originally located at Caroline Street on the boardwalk until it moved to its current location in 1977. It currently serves as the Ocean City Life-Saving Station Museum since 1978.

== Ocean City Life-Saving Station Museum ==
The Ocean City Life-Saving Station Museum displays exhibits on storms, sea life and life-saving in Ocean City. Other exhibits in the two-floor building include a boat room, beach vacation artifacts, commercial fishing information, the history of the pioneering women of Ocean City, over 200 samples of sand from around the world, and OC surfing. Several tanks house local marine animals such as American eel, Horseshoe crabs and seahorses.

During the summer season, typically from Memorial Day through September, the museum hosts free summer programs centered on educating the public on Ocean City history and the area's natural habitat.

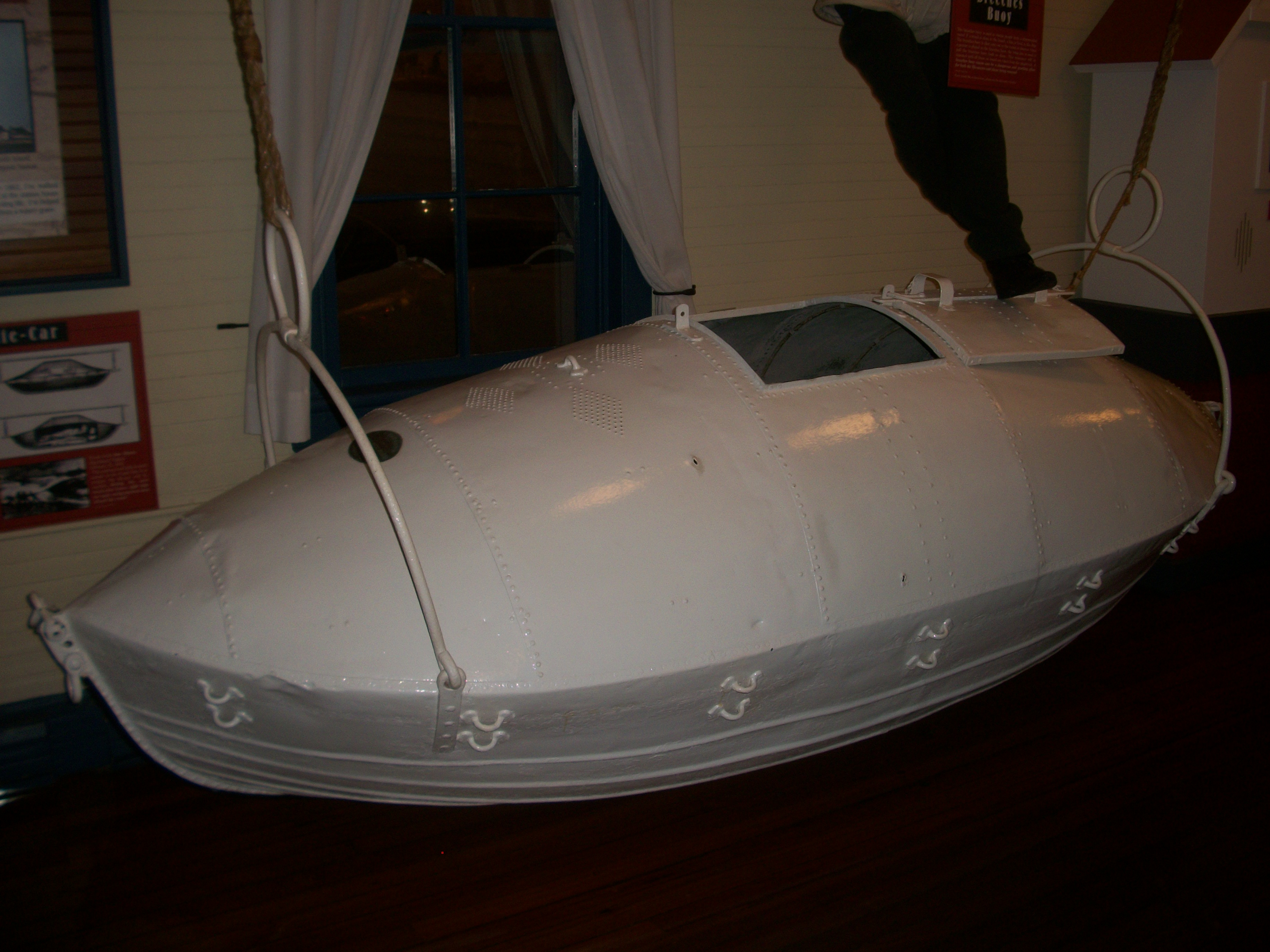
Capsule formerly used by life station personnel to rescue shipwreck survivors

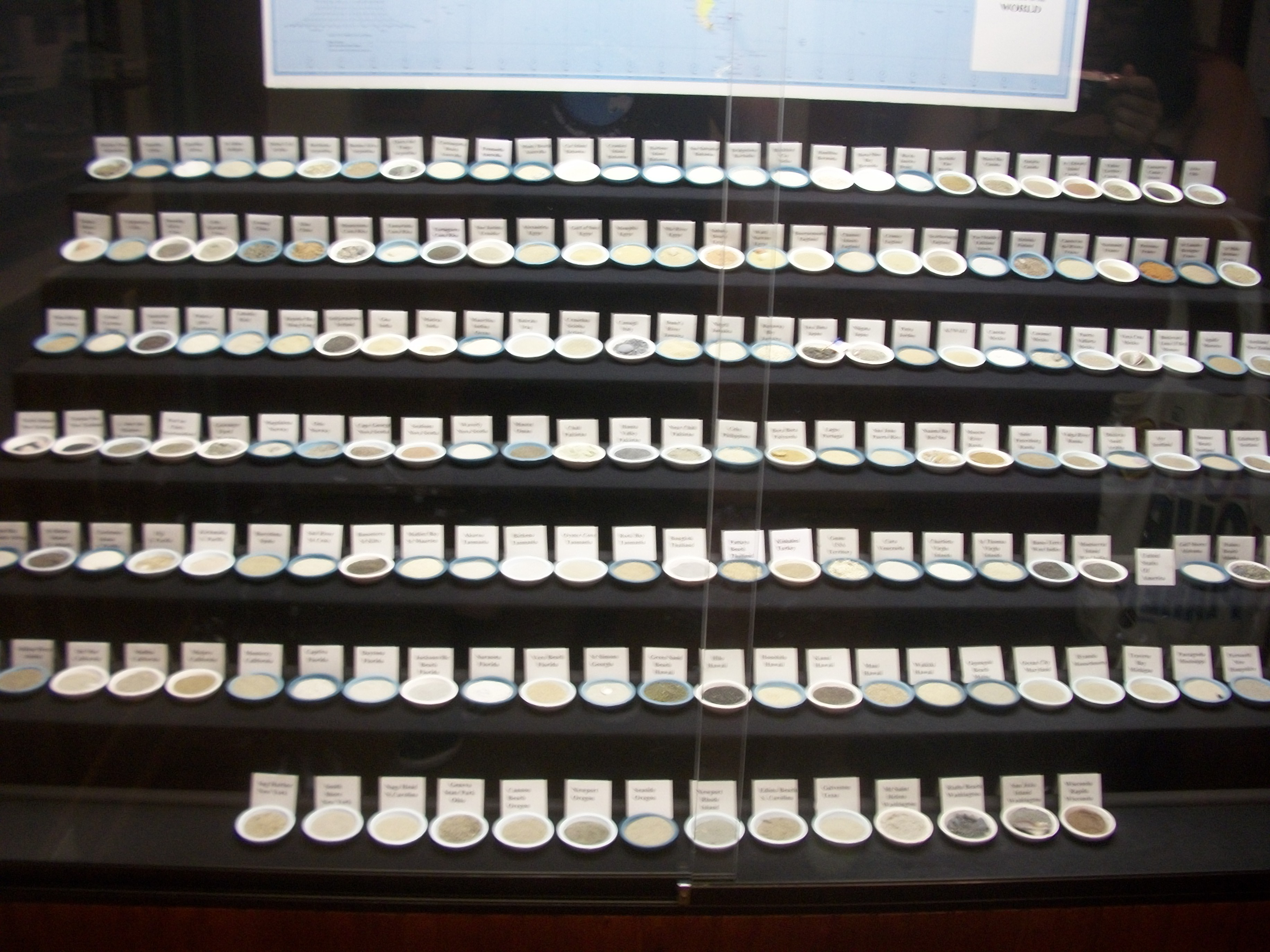
Museum display of sands of the world.

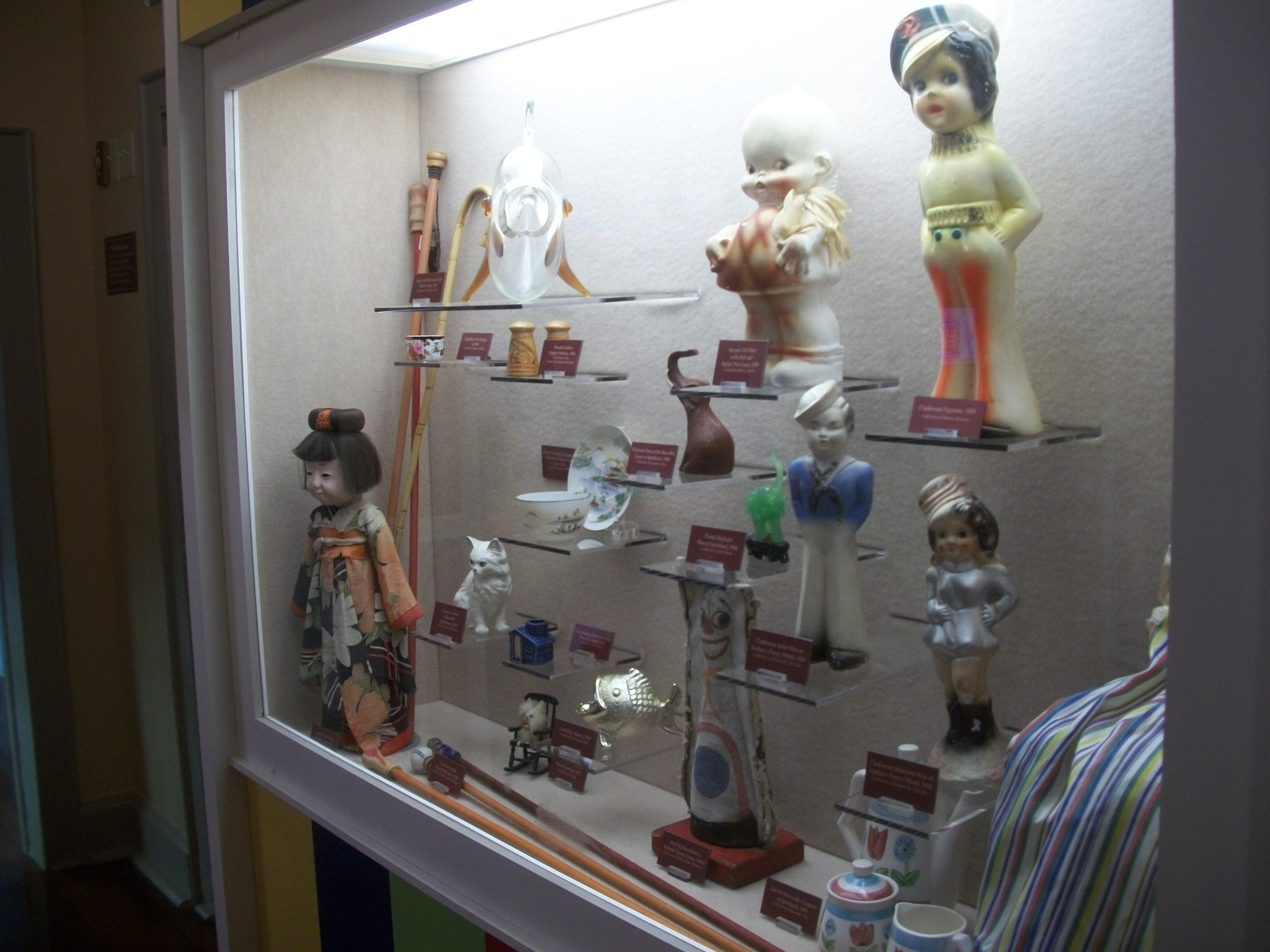
Museum display of former boardwalk arcade prizes.
