= St. Martin River =

River in Maryland, United States

Coordinates: 38°24′10″N 75°8′30″W

The St. Martin River is a tributary of Isle of Wight Bay in Worcester County, Maryland. Approximately 4.4 miles (7.1 km) long, it drains the northernmost part of Worcester County.

A short river, the St. Martin broadens rapidly to enter Isle of Wight Bay where the bay is crossed by Maryland Route 90. Most of the river is a tidal estuary. Its two main tributaries are the Bishopville Prong and the Shingle Landing Prong.

The St. Martin forms the northern boundary of Ocean Pines, Maryland; Bishopville, Maryland is on the Bishopville Prong of the river.
