= Ocean City, Maryland =

- City
- Ocean City in July 2018

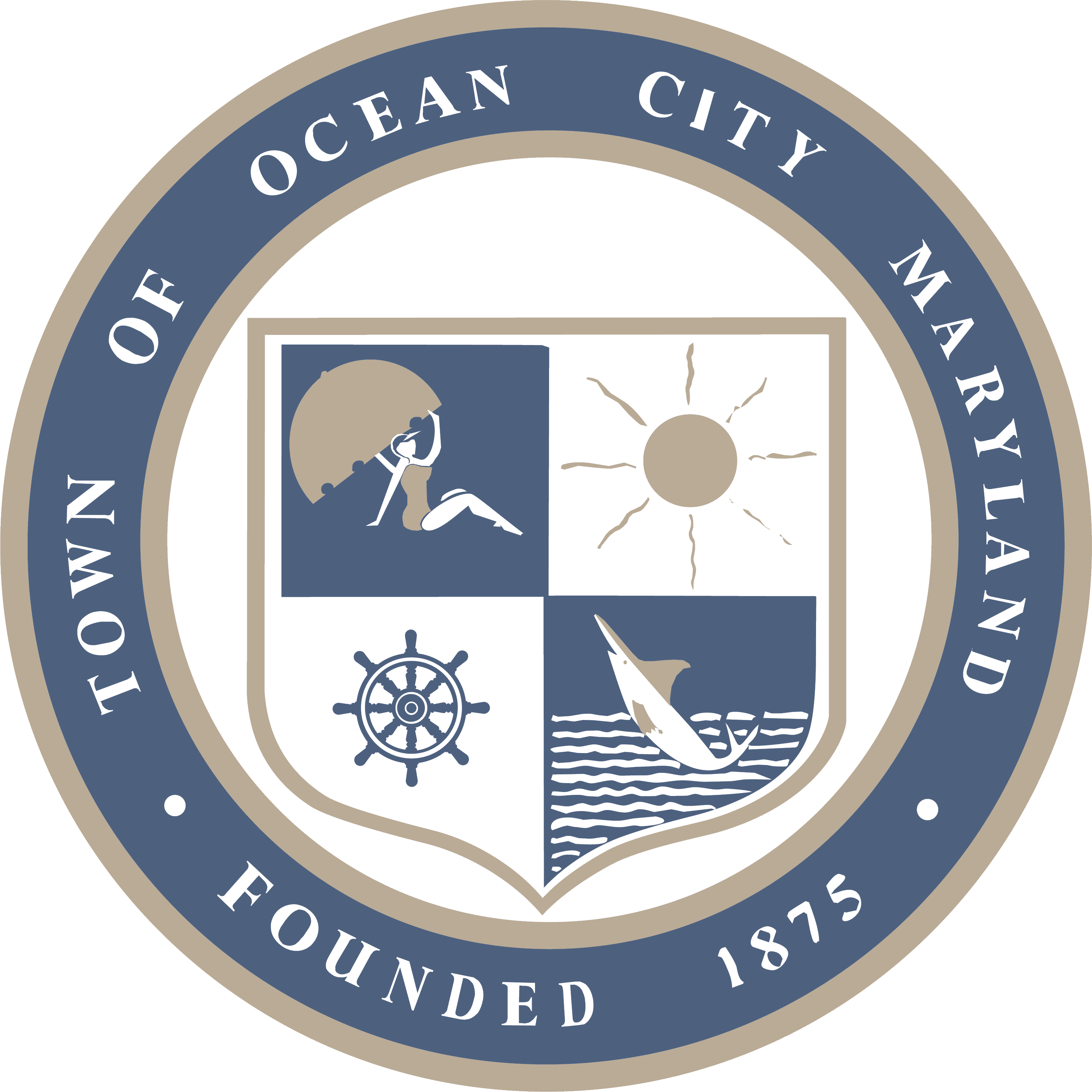
- Flag Seal Coat of arms Wordmark
- Nicknames: "The White Marlin Capital of the World", "OC", "OCMD"
- Location in Worcester County and Maryland

- Location in Maryland Ocean City (the United States)
- Coordinates: 38°23′29″N 75°4′11″W
- Country: United States
- State: Maryland
- County: Worcester
- Founded: 1875
- Incorporated: 1880

Government
  - Type: Council-manager
  - Mayor: Matthew James (R)
  - City Council: Member List: Matt James (President); Tony DeLucas (Secretary); Peter Buas; John Gehrig Jr.; Frank Knight; Lloyd Martin; Mark Paddack

Area
  - Total: 9.65 sq mi (24.99 km^{2})
  - Land: 4.53 sq mi (11.73 km^{2})
  - Water: 5.12 sq mi (13.25 km^{2}) 53.05%
- Elevation: 6.6 ft (2 m)

Population (2020)
  - Total: 6,844
  - Density: 1,510.5/sq mi (583.22/km^{2})
- 320,000–345,000 estimated summer weekend population
- Time zone: UTC−5 (Eastern)
  - Summer (DST): UTC−4 (Eastern)
- ZIP Codes: 21842–21843
- Area codes: 410, 443, and 667
- FIPS code: 24-58225
- GNIS feature ID: 0586284
- Website: www.oceancitymd.gov

Ocean City is a resort city in Worcester County, Maryland, United States, along the Atlantic coast of the United States. The population was 6,844 in the 2020 U.S. census, although during summer weekends the city hosts between 320,000 and 345,000 vacationers, and up to eight million visitors annually. During the summer, Ocean City becomes the second most populated municipality in Maryland, after Baltimore. It is part of the Salisbury metropolitan area as defined by the United States Census Bureau.

During peak vacation season, the city gains over 1,000 seasonal police officers, along with additional firefighters and other workers. Numerous events take place within the town during the shoulder-season, including Sunfest, Springfest, Bike Week, Cruisin' Weekend, Winterfest of Lights, and Reach the Beach, which take place on the Boardwalk and at the Roland E. Powell Convention Center.

== History ==
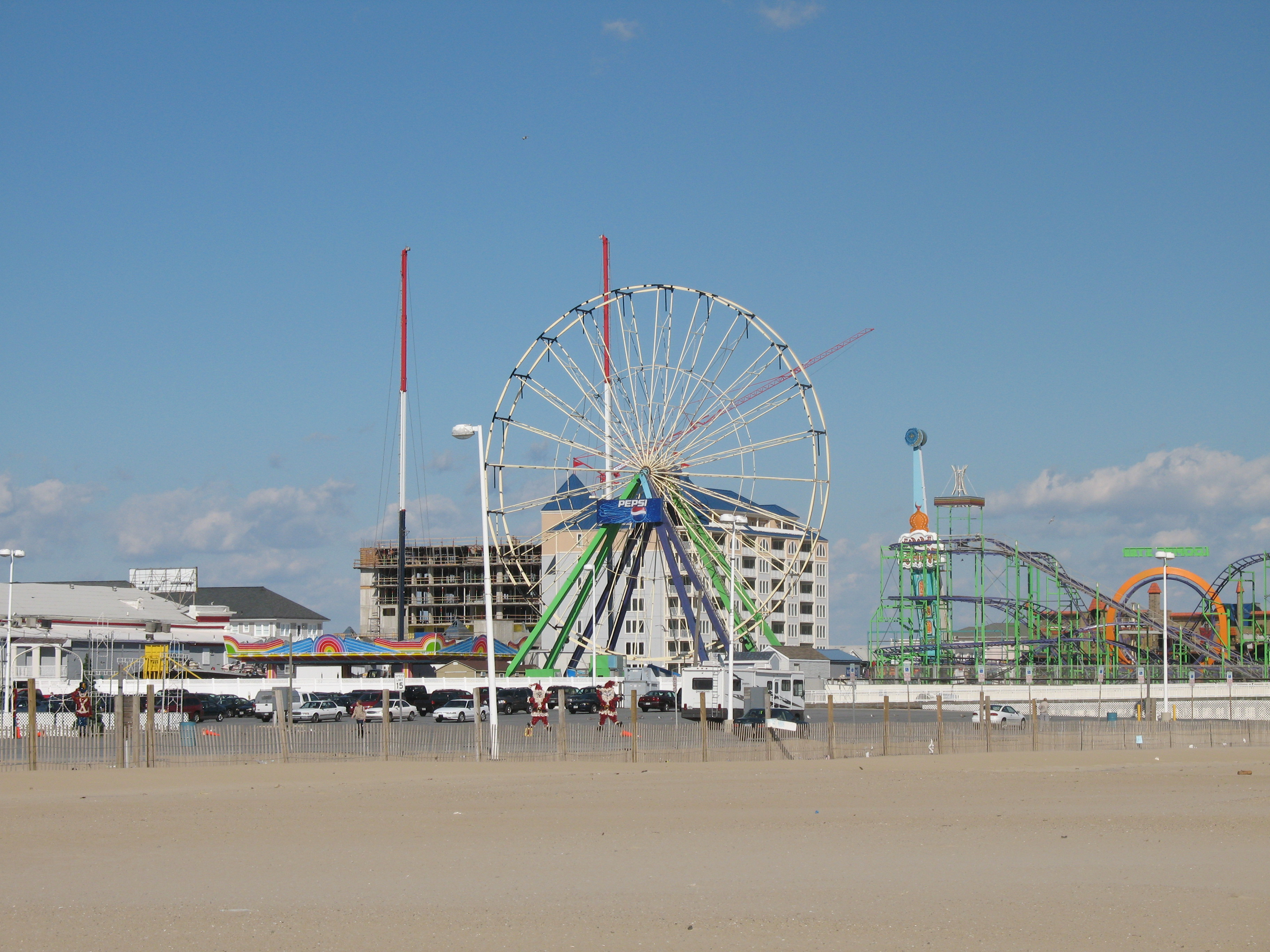
Ocean City's inlet during the offseason

=== 19th century ===
Before the European colonization of what is now Maryland in the 17th century, the shoreline of the Delmarva Peninsula had been populated for thousands of years by Indigenous peoples, including the Algonquian-speaking Assateague and Nanticoke peoples. The land on which the city was built and much of the surrounding area was obtained by Thomas Fenwick, an Englishman, from the Indigenous peoples of the region. In 1869, businessman Isaac Coffin built the first beach-front cottage to receive paying guests. During those days, guests arrived by stagecoach and ferry.

Soon after, other simple boarding houses were built on the strip of sand, with the activity attracting prominent businessmen from the Maryland Eastern Shore, Baltimore, Philadelphia, and Wilmington, Delaware. They came not so much to visit as to survey the spit. A decision was made to develop it, and 250 lots were carved out. A corporation was formed to help develop the land. The corporation’s stock of 4,000 shares sold for $25 each.

Before 1870, what is now Ocean City was known as "The Ladies' Resort to the Ocean".

The Atlantic Hotel, the first major hotel in the town, opened on July 4, 1875. The Atlantic Hotel was originally owned by the Atlantic Hotel Company, but Charles W. Purnell eventually bought it in 1923. As of 2025, it is still owned and operated by the Purnell family. Besides the beach and ocean, it offered dancing and billiard rooms to the visitors of its more than 400 rooms, and for years it was the northernmost attraction in Ocean City. By 1878, tourists could come by the Wicomico & Pocomoke Railroad from Berlin to the shores of Sinepuxent Bay across from the town. By 1881, a line was completed from across Sinepuxent Bay to the shore, bringing rail passengers on the Baltimore, Chesapeake and Atlantic Railroad directly into the town to a train station and returning to larger city markets with locally caught fish from Ocean City.

=== 20th century ===
1933 hurricane in Ocean City

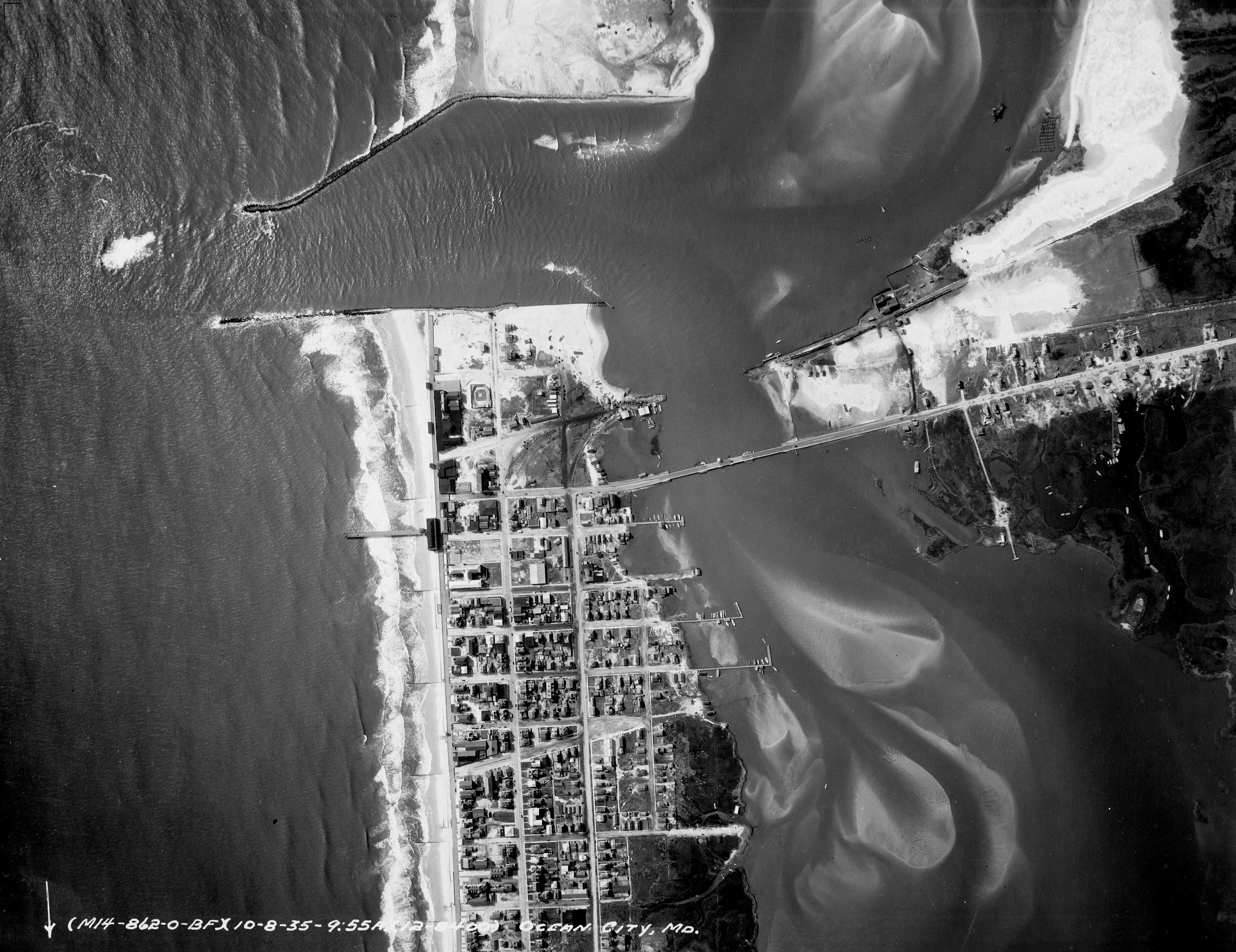
Ocean City, 1935

In 1930, the Ocean City Beach Patrol was formed in order to better protect the bathers who frequented the shoreline. It was done in collaboration with Mayor William W. McCabe and Coast Guard Captain William Purnell.

The Ocean City Inlet was formed during a significant hurricane in August 1933, which also destroyed the train tracks across the Sinepuxent Bay. The inlet separated what is now Ocean City from Assateague Island. Another hurricane the following month widened the inlet from about 100 feet (30 m) to over 500 feet (152 m). The U.S. Army Corps of Engineers took advantage of nature's intervention and made the inlet permanent at the south end of Ocean City. The inlet eventually helped establish Ocean City as an important mid-Atlantic fishing port by providing easy access to the Atlantic Ocean fishing grounds.

In the late 1930s, the Army Corps of Engineers dredged a new channel on the bayside of Ocean City to allow larger boats to have access to Sinepuxent Bay. The dredge was pumped back onto the western shore of Ocean City allowing the creation of Chicago Avenue and St. Louis Avenue, leading to new development where previously only marshland had been.

Ocean City underwent a fairly rapid expansion during the post-World War II boom. In 1952, with the completion of the Chesapeake Bay Bridge, Ocean City became easily accessible to people in the Baltimore–Washington metropolitan area. In 1964, with the completion of the Chesapeake Bay Bridge-Tunnel, another pathway to the south was opened. This tunnel connects Northampton County on the Delmarva Peninsula to Southeast Virginia. These two events helped Ocean City become one of the largest vacation areas on the East Coast.

By the 1970s, big business flourished, leading to the construction of more than 15,000 condominium units. However, throughout the 1980s and into the 1990s, the width of the beach began to shrink, prompting the first of a series of beach replenishment projects.

A fire during the annual Sunfest destroyed five boardwalk businesses in 1994. There was a small water park and giant walk-through haunted house with live actors near the end of the pier and a New Orleans-style Hollywood in Wax Museum on the boardwalk side. In the mid 1990s, the wax museum closed and was turned into a Photon laser tag arena. The building now houses the Ripley's Believe it or Not! museum.

=== 21st century ===
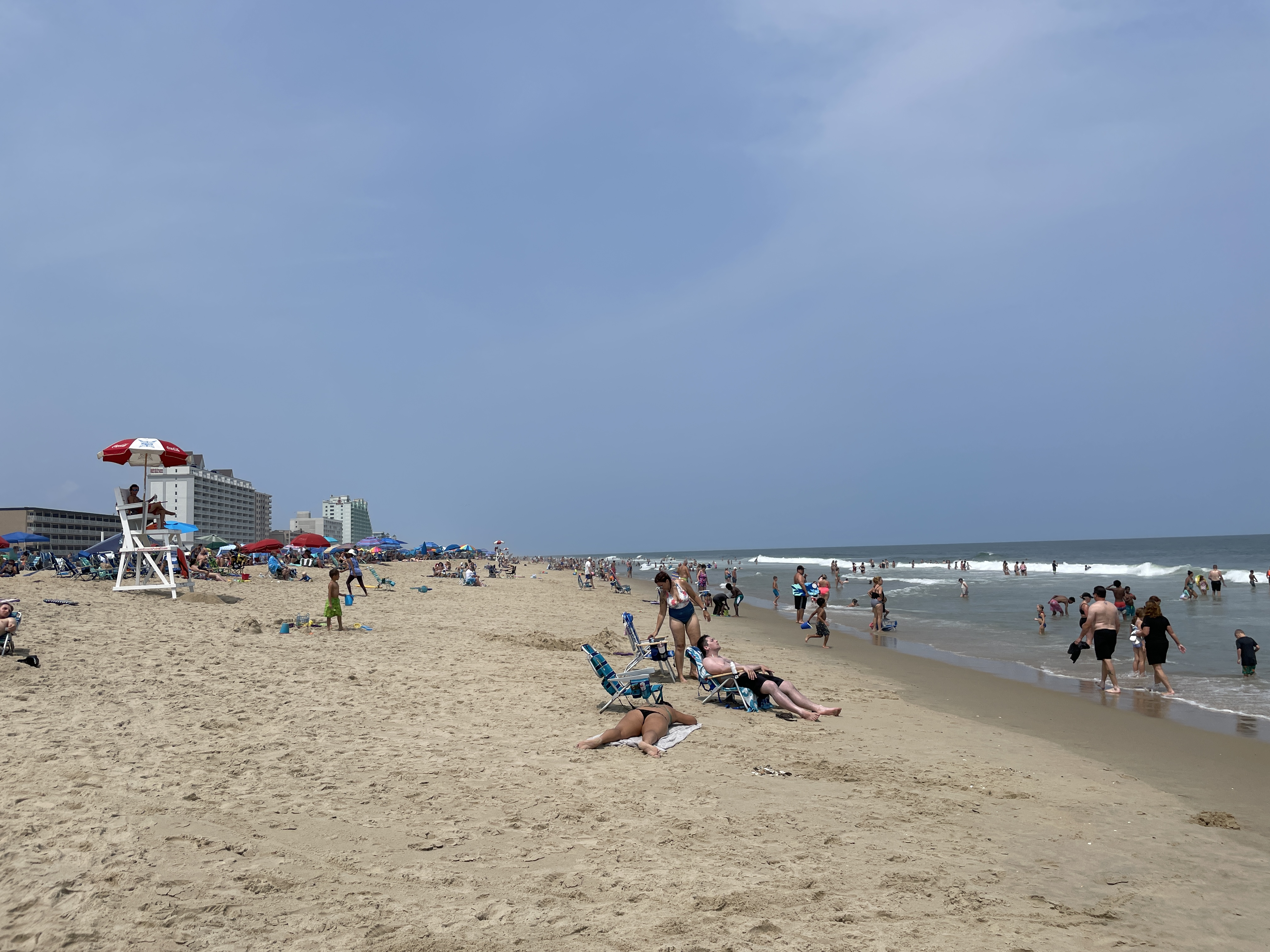
Ocean City beach at 25th Street

In 2002, Ocean City undertook a multi-million dollar beach restoration program in an attempt to slow the westward migration of its beaches. The program pumped tons of sand from offshore and deposited it onto the beach. A dune line was also re-established in front of Ocean City's building line. Another similar project began after the 2006 tourist season closed.

In 2006, the city erected the Ocean City Firefighter's Memorial to honor local firefighters as well as firefighters who died in the September 11 attacks. In addition to a statue of a firefighter, the monument incorporates a piece of steel beam from one of the towers destroyed at the World Trade Center.

The resort area was visited by approximately 8 million visitors in 2011.

In 2022, the Town of Ocean City announced the Oceans Calling Festival, a four-day music event drawing major artists such as the Dave Matthews Band, Cyndi Lauper, The Lumineers, and Alanis Morissette. However, Hurricane Ian forced the event to be rescheduled for fall 2023.

Ocean City continues to sprawl westward across the bay, toward Berlin and Ocean Pines. It was part of the Ocean Pines micropolitan statistical area until that was subsumed by the Salisbury metropolitan area.

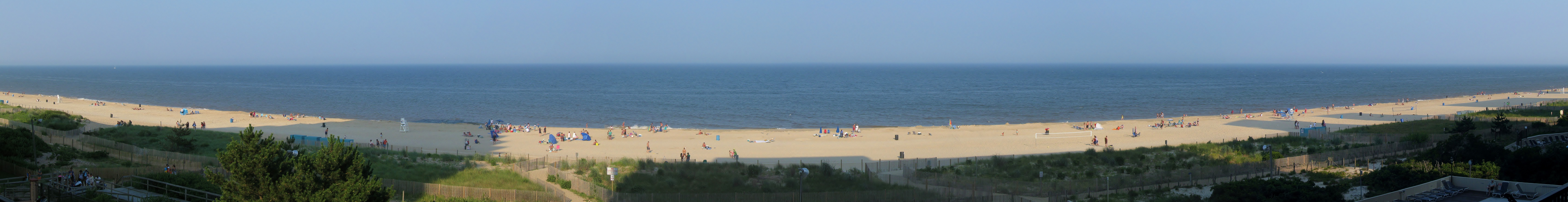
Beach in Ocean City

== Geography ==
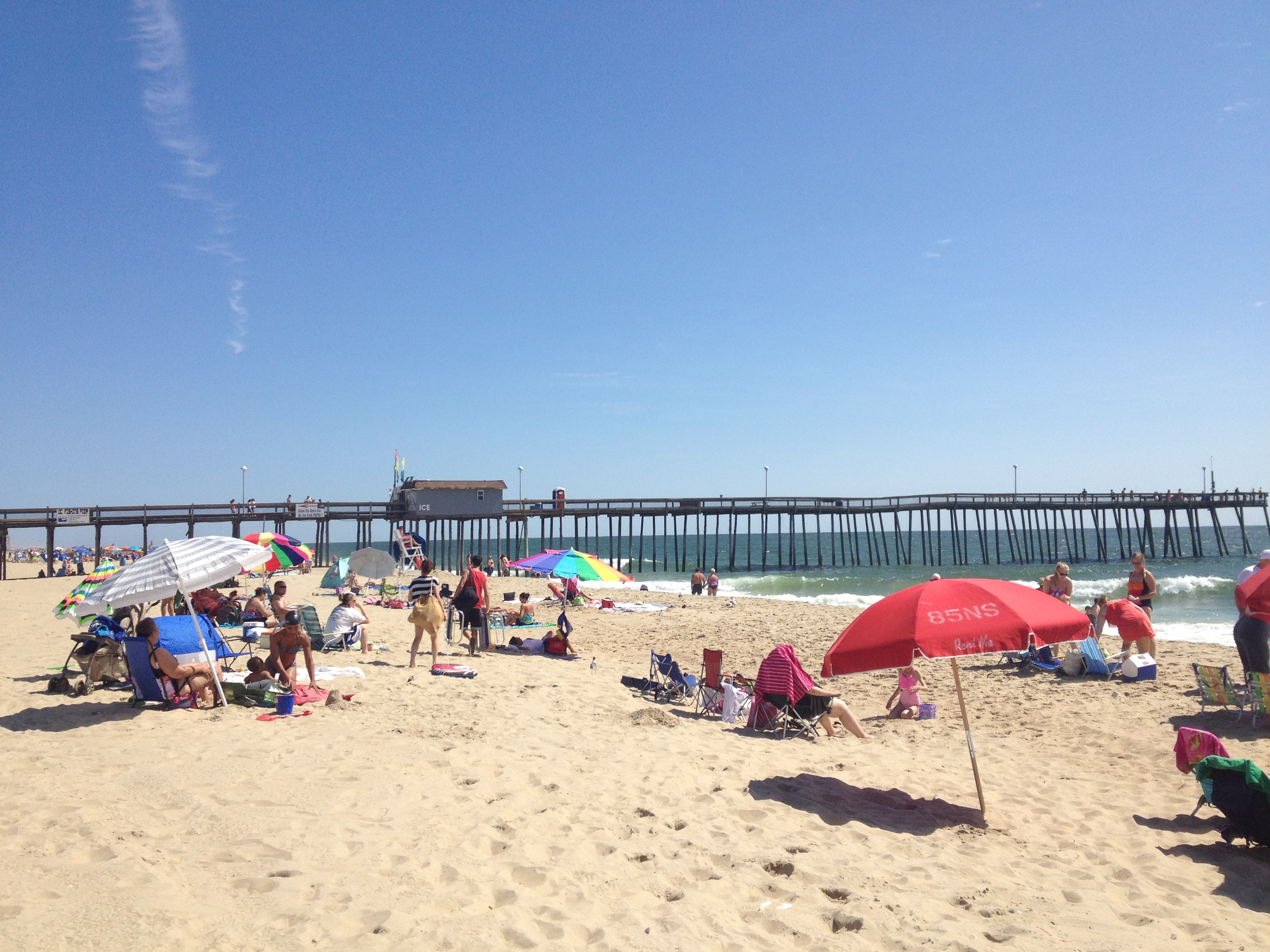
Ocean City pier and beach

According to the U.S. Census Bureau, the town has a total area of 36.37 square miles (94.20 km^{2}), of which 4.41 square miles (11.42 km^{2}) is land and 31.96 square miles (82.78 km^{2}) is water.

Ocean City is located on Fenwick Island, a barrier spit which encompasses Ocean City, as well as South Bethany and Fenwick Island, Delaware. Ocean City's southern point is an inlet formed by the 1933 Chesapeake–Potomac hurricane. Rainfall and tides swelled the rivers and bays surrounding Ocean City until the overflowing water cut a 50-foot (15 m) crevasse from the bay to the ocean. Ocean City businessmen had long sought funding to create an inlet to support a harbor, so residents seized the opportunity and built jetties to ensure the city's land remained divided from what is now Assateague Island.

=== Climate ===
According to the Köppen climate classification system, Ocean City, Maryland, has a humid subtropical (Köppen: Cfa) or oceanic with long, warm to hot and humid summers, cool winters, and year-round precipitation. Ocean City receives 2,300 hours of sunshine annually (which is higher than the US average). Temperatures are moderate in Ocean City due to its location on the Atlantic coast. During the summer months, a cooling afternoon sea breeze is present on most days, with an average of only 10 days annually reaching 90 °F (32 °C). However, in 2010, the temperature rose to 103 °F (39 °C), which was the hottest air temperature on record, and episodes of extreme heat combined with tropical humidity can occur with heat index values ≥ 100 °F (37.8 °C).

The geographic location of Ocean City places it just north of where Atlantic tropical cyclones turn out to sea along the East Coast, so direct hits from tropical storms and hurricanes are rare, although they sometimes brush the area. The Atlantic hurricane season runs from June 1 through November 30, peaking sharply from late August through September.

During the winter months, Ocean City has cool weather with an average high of 45°F (7.5°C); however, periods of mild temperatures in the 50 to 60 °F (10 to 16 °C) range are common. The air temperature fails to rise above freezing 5.8 days on average and the plant hardiness zone is 7b with an average annual extreme minimum air temperature of 9.1 °F (−12.7 °C). On rare occasion, episodes of extreme cold and wind can occur with wind chill values below 5 °F (−15 °C). The coldest temperature on record was −6 °F (−21 °C). The average seasonal (Dec-Mar) snowfall is quite low in Ocean City, averaging 4 to 6 in (10 to 15 cm), and several years may pass with no snowfall at all.

Climate data for Ocean City Beach, MD (1991-2020 Averages)
Month	Jan	Feb	Mar	Apr	May	Jun	Jul	Aug	Sep	Oct	Nov	Dec	Year
Record high °F (°C)	78 (26)	78 (26)	88 (31)	94 (34)	98 (37)	102 (39)	103 (39)	100 (38)	99 (37)	94 (34)	84 (29)	78 (26)	103 (39)
Mean daily maximum °F (°C)	44.9 (7.2)	46.7 (8.2)	52.2 (11.2)	61.5 (16.4)	70.1 (21.2)	79.3 (26.3)	84.2 (29.0)	82.6 (28.1)	77.1 (25.1)	67.5 (19.7)	57.5 (14.2)	49.5 (9.7)	64.4 (18.0)
Daily mean °F (°C)	36.4 (2.4)	38.0 (3.3)	43.8 (6.6)	52.8 (11.6)	61.8 (16.6)	71.3 (21.8)	76.3 (24.6)	74.8 (23.8)	69.1 (20.6)	58.4 (14.7)	48.1 (8.9)	40.7 (4.8)	56.0 (13.3)
Mean daily minimum °F (°C)	27.9 (−2.3)	29.3 (−1.5)	35.4 (1.9)	44.1 (6.7)	53.4 (11.9)	63.3 (17.4)	68.4 (20.2)	67.1 (19.5)	61.1 (16.2)	49.2 (9.6)	38.8 (3.8)	31.9 (−0.1)	47.5 (8.6)
Record low °F (°C)	−6 (−21)	−2 (−19)	8 (−13)	22 (−6)	30 (−1)	40 (4)	45 (7)	41 (5)	31 (−1)	22 (−6)	15 (−9)	−2 (−19)	−6 (−21)
Average precipitation inches (mm)	3.39 (86)	2.95 (75)	3.86 (98)	3.00 (76)	3.76 (96)	3.32 (84)	3.77 (96)	3.83 (97)	3.93 (100)	4.04 (103)	3.18 (81)	3.60 (91)	42.63 (1,083)
Average relative humidity (%)	68.8	68.4	63.9	66.0	71.4	74.4	74.8	76.3	74.7	72.9	71.1	69.5	71.0
Average dew point °F (°C)	27.4 (−2.6)	29.0 (−1.7)	33.5 (0.8)	42.7 (5.9)	53.3 (11.8)	63.4 (17.4)	68.4 (20.2)	67.7 (19.8)	61.5 (16.4)	50.8 (10.4)	41.2 (5.1)	31.9 (−0.1)	47.7 (8.7)
Source 1: NOAA
Source 2: PRISM

== Demographics ==
Historical population
Census	Pop.	Note	%±
1880	49		—
1890	85		73.5%
1900	365		329.4%
1910	476		30.4%
1920	711		49.4%
1930	946		33.1%
1940	1,052		11.2%
1950	1,234		17.3%
1960	983		−20.3%
1970	1,493		51.9%
1980	4,946		231.3%
1990	5,146		4.0%
2000	7,173		39.4%
2010	7,102		−1.0%
2020	6,844		−3.6%
U.S. Decennial Census

=== 2020 census ===
As of the 2020 census, Ocean City had a population of 6,844. The population density was 1,510.5 inhabitants per square mile. The median age was 56.3 years. 9.3% of residents were under the age of 18 and 33.9% of residents were 65 years of age or older. For every 100 females there were 99.5 males, and for every 100 females age 18 and over there were 99.4 males age 18 and over.

100.0% of residents lived in urban areas, while 0.0% lived in rural areas.

There were 3,820 households in Ocean City, of which 11.2% had children under the age of 18 living in them. Of all households, 34.0% were married-couple households, 27.4% were households with a male householder and no spouse or partner present, and 31.6% were households with a female householder and no spouse or partner present. About 46.7% of all households were made up of individuals and 21.0% had someone living alone who was 65 years of age or older.

There were 30,028 housing units, including 3,820 occupied year-round and 26,208 vacant units. Of all housing units, 87.3% were vacant. The homeowner vacancy rate was 4.3% and the rental vacancy rate was 45.4%.

Racial composition as of the 2020 census
Race	Number	Percentage
White	5,994	87.6%
Black or African American	140	2.0%
American Indian and Alaska Native	21	0.3%
Asian	124	1.8%
Native Hawaiian and Other Pacific Islander	2	0.0%
Some other race	169	2.5%
Two or more races	394	5.8%
Hispanic or Latino (of any race)	409	6.0%

=== 2010 census ===
As of the census of 2010, there were 7,102 people, 3,852 households, and 1,784 families residing in the town. The population density was 1,610.4 inhabitants per square mile (621.8/km^{2}). There were 30,119 housing units at an average density of 6,829.7 per square mile (2,637.0/km^{2}). The racial makeup of the town was 92.2% White, 2.7% African American, 0.2% Native American, 1.3% Asian, 2.2% from other races, and 1.4% from two or more races. Hispanic or Latino of any race were 5.9% of the population.

There were 3,852 households, of which 11.1% had children under the age of 18 living with them, 36.8% were married couples living together, 6.3% had a female householder with no husband present, 3.3% had a male householder with no wife present, and 53.7% were non-families. 42.8% of all households were made up of individuals, and 17.5% had someone living alone who was 65 years of age or older. The average household size was 1.84, and the average family size was 2.41.

The median age in the town was 54.2 years. 9.1% of residents were under the age of 18; 6.7% were between the ages of 18 and 24; 20.8% were from 25 to 44; 33.8% were from 45 to 64; and 29.6% were 65 years of age or older. The gender makeup of the town was 51.4% male and 48.6% female.

== Economy ==
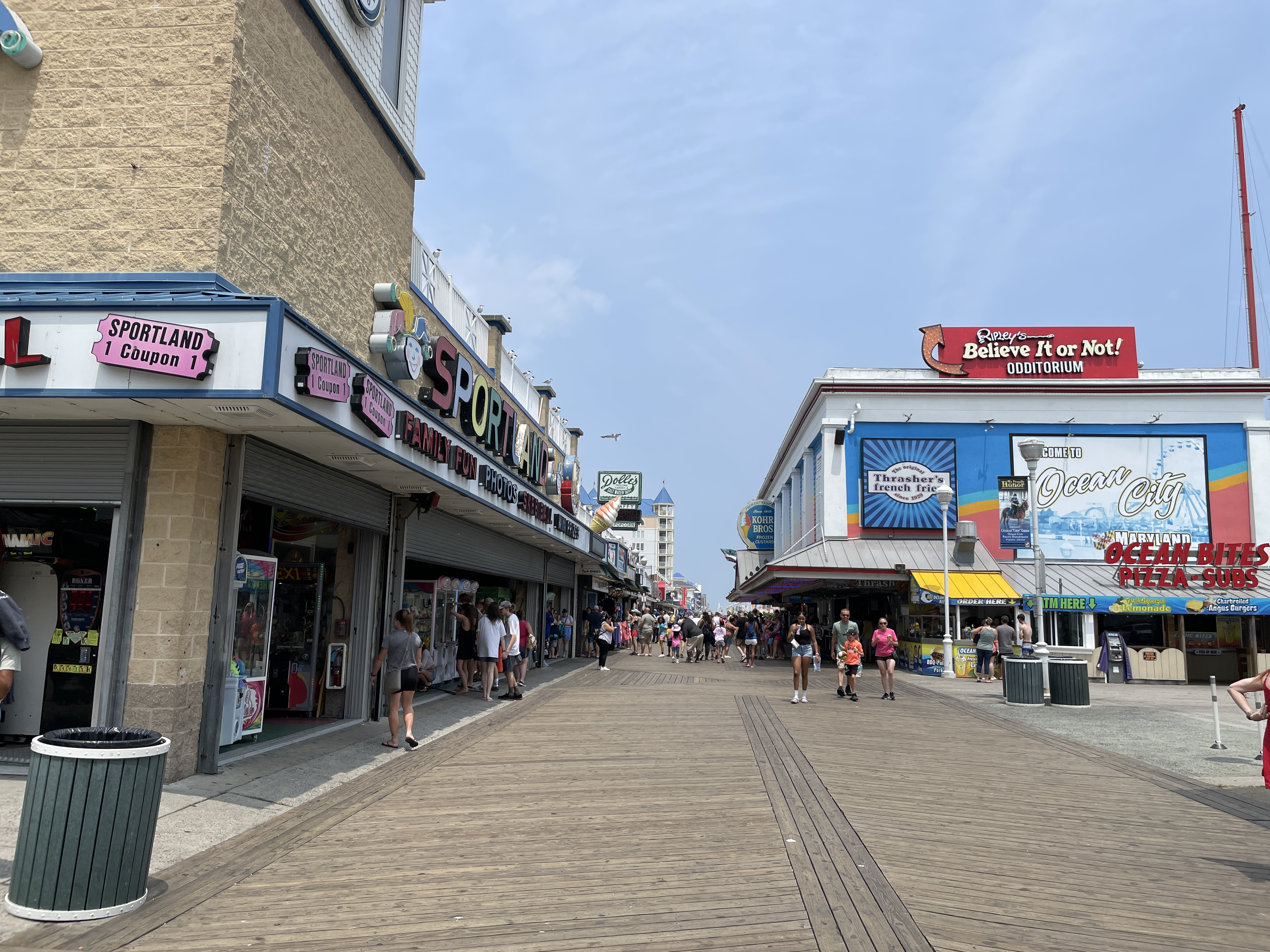
Ocean City boardwalk looking north at Worcester Street

Ocean City extends just over 9 mi (14 km) from the southern inlet to the Delaware line. The strip supports hotels, motels, apartment houses, shopping centers, residential communities, and condominiums. The southern tip houses the Ocean City Boardwalk. The boardwalk is the town's main shopping and entertainment district. The Boardwalk has two amusement parks, Trimpers Rides and The Pier, which was recently renamed Jolly Roger at The Pier after its sister uptown local amusement park. The downtown neighborhood, Old Town, is marked by Victorian-style houses and other older buildings.

Ocean City has a long history of fishing, both commercial and recreational. The town bills itself as the "White Marlin Capital of the World". During the summer, numerous charter and private boats fish for billfish, tuna, wahoo, and other game fish. In early August, the White Marlin Open, the largest billfishing tournament in the world, is held. Prize money for the largest white marlin, blue marlin, and tuna can range over $3 million. The tournament typically attracts hundreds of attendees.

== Arts and culture ==
=== Boardwalk ===
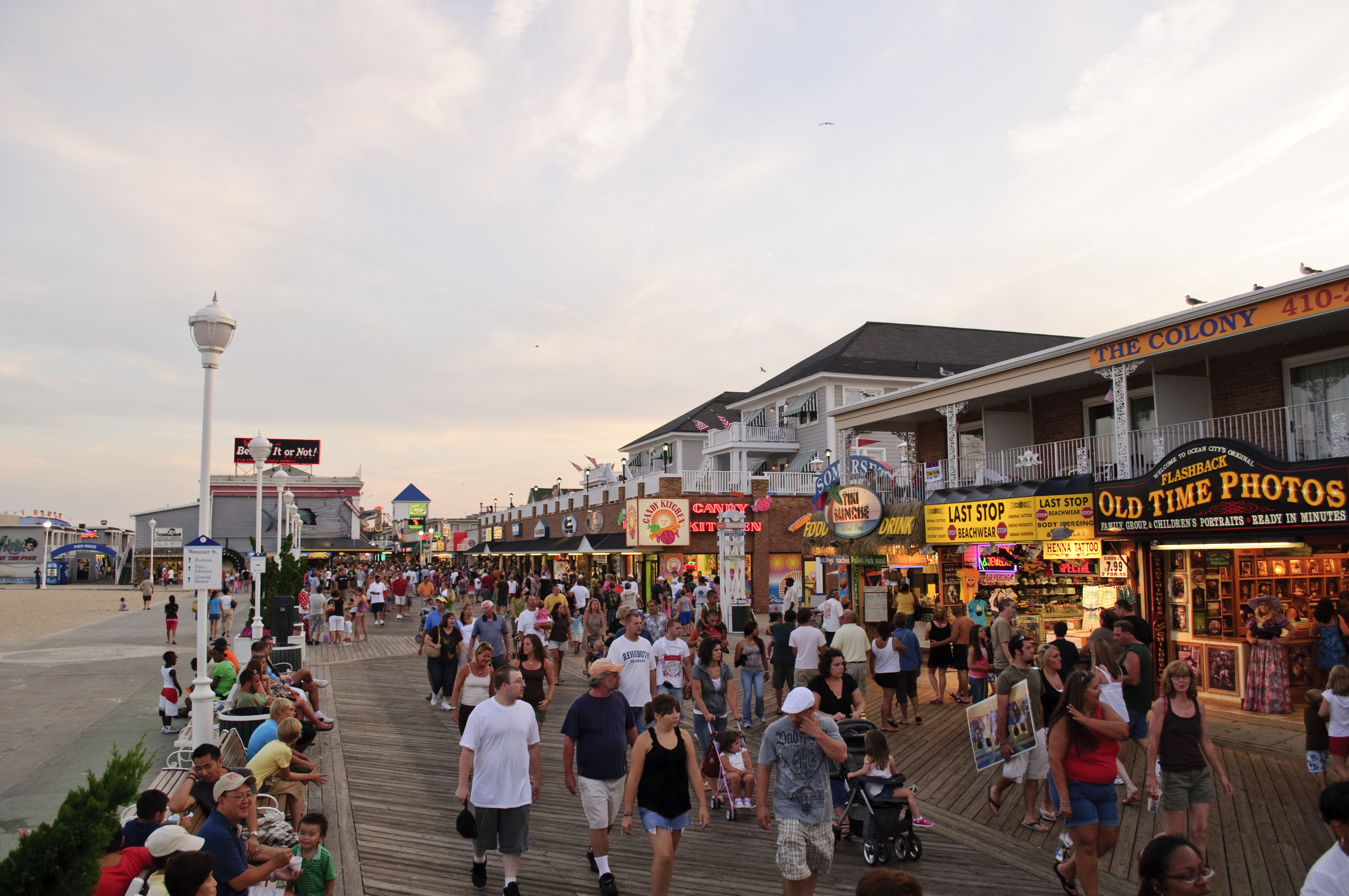
Ocean City Boardwalk looking south

The Ocean City Boardwalk currently runs from South 2nd Street at the Ocean City Inlet in South Ocean City (by the Ocean City Life Saving Station Museum) up to 27th Street in South Ocean City. The boardwalk is home to food, shops, arcades, and amusements.

Originally called the "Atlantic Avenue", the first Ocean City boardwalk was constructed in 1902. After being damaged by a storm in 1962, the boardwalk was rebuilt to stretch a total of 2.25 miles (3.62 km), which is its current length. In 1985, the boardwalk suffered extensive storm damage during Hurricane Gloria, which pummeled Ocean City with 89 MPH winds; however, the boardwalk was refurbished, and a concrete sea wall was soon constructed to prevent further damage. The aftermath of Hurricane Gloria led to the first phase of extensive beach replenishment projects in Ocean City.

In 2012, the Ocean City Boardwalk was damaged again by Hurricane Sandy, which flooded and destroyed half of it. The boardwalk has since been rebuilt to its original length and attracts many tourists.

Also located in South Ocean City is Trimper's Rides, a historic amusement park founded in 1893 as The Windsor Resort. Trimper's Rides is home to one of the United States' oldest operational carousel rides. Colloquially known as "The Pride of the Boardwalk", the 1912 Herschell-Spillman carousel received the National Carousel Association's Historic Carousel Award in 1996.

=== Dining and nightlife ===
The Midtown section of Ocean City stretches from 28th Street to 90th Street and is home to dining along the bay and nightlife. Located in Midtown are the Jolly Roger Amusement Park and the Roland E. Powell Convention Center. This area also features the Seacrets entertainment complex on 49th Street, one of the highest-grossing bars in the country, known for bringing in hundreds of coconut palms and other tropical plants in the summer.

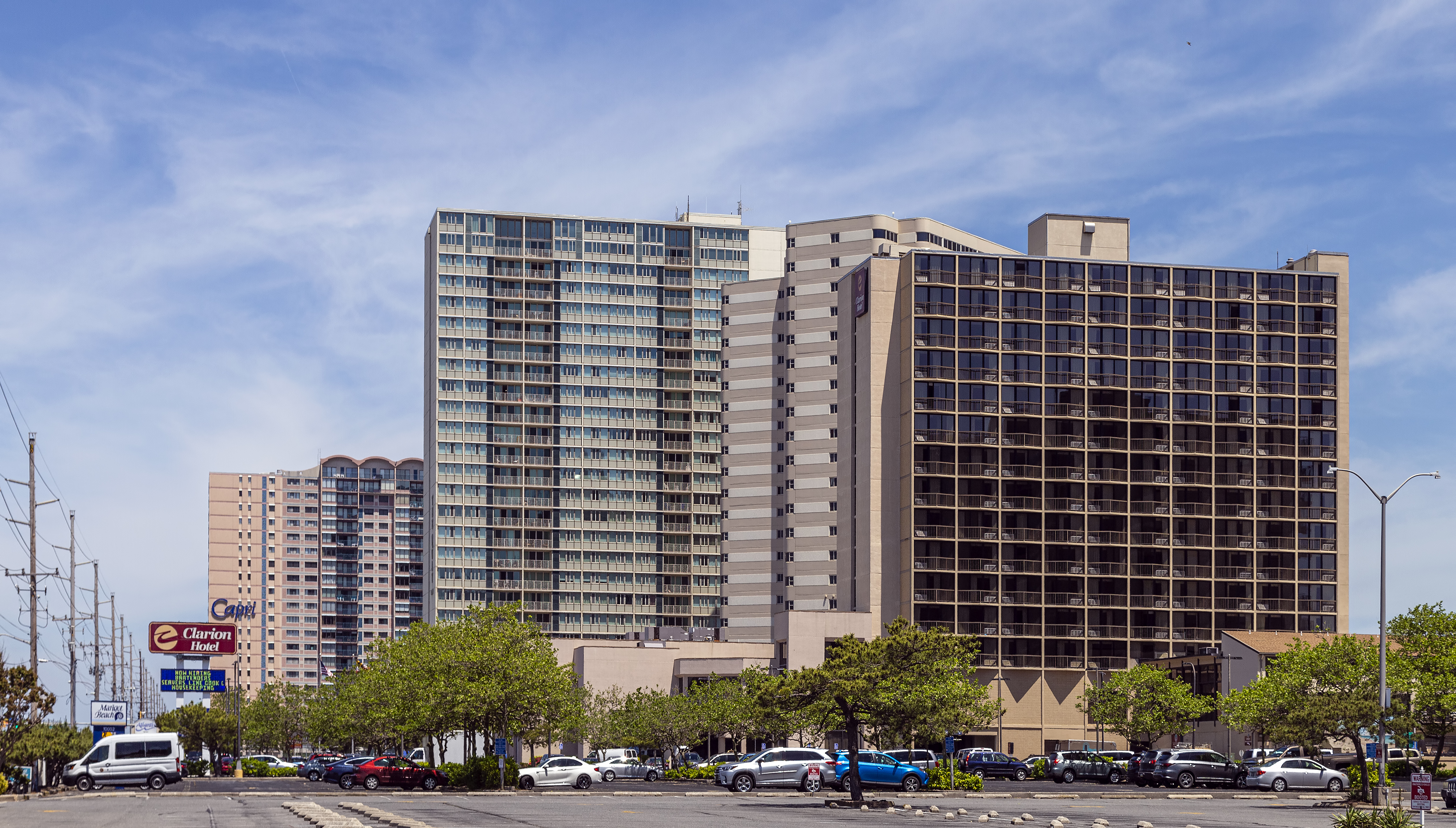
High-rise hotels and condominiums in North Ocean City

=== Historic sites ===
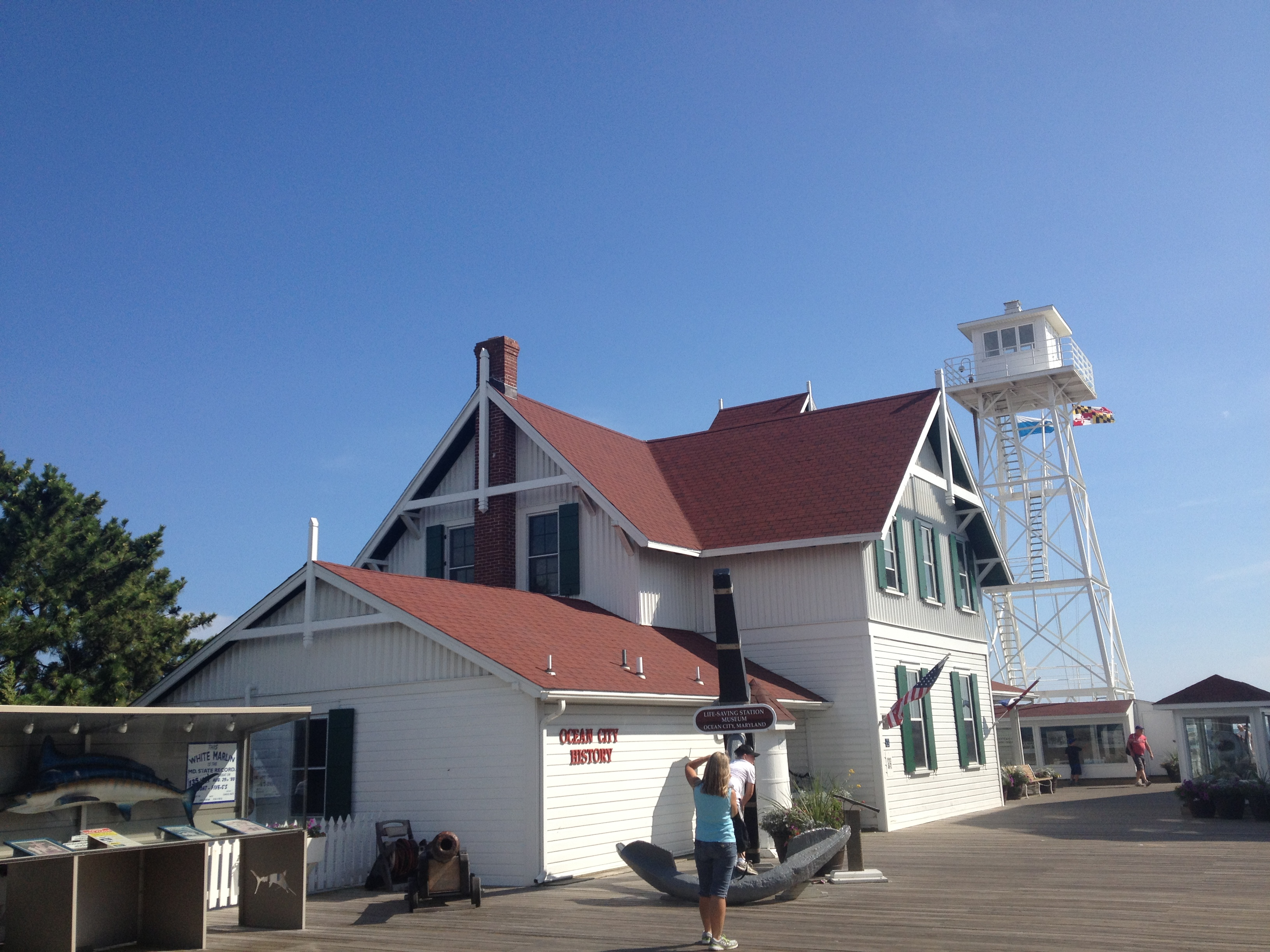
Ocean City Life Saving Station Museum

Historic sites include:

- The Sandy Point Site and St. Paul's by-the-sea Protestant Episcopal Church, which are both listed on the National Register of Historic Places.
- An anchor recovered from the sailboat wreck in 1870 of the commercial clam vessel Star Light.
- The Atlantic Hotel. After a fire destroyed the original and first hotel in Ocean City, the Atlantic Hotel was rebuilt in 1926 and is one of the oldest hotels in Ocean City.
- The Ocean City Life Saving Station Museum. The station was part of the coastal system. It was built in 1891 and dedicated as a museum in 1978.

=== Senior Week ===
Ocean City is known for its Senior Week activities, when recent high school graduates from Maryland and surrounding states travel to the City. Senior Week historically begins the first week after graduation, and the graduates often are referred to as "June Bugs". Senior Week has slowed down after COVID-19, with local property management company's taking a strong stance in their age requirements, typically 25+ in age requirements. This comes from legal risk and risk of safety concerns, including one terrible incident in 2024.

=== Other ===
The Ocean City Film Festival takes place every year in early March. The city is home to the Brine Beach Lacrosse Festival in the second week of June. Ocean City is also home to the annual Maryland State Firefighters Convention, a week-long event in June that honors the state's firefighters.

== Parks and recreation ==
=== Skate park and other attractions ===
First opened in June 1976, Ocean Bowl Skate Park in South Ocean City was the first skate park on the East Coast of the United States, built by McCoy Jack, and is the longest-running municipal skate park in the United States today. Due to time, wear, and the current needs of skaters, the original bowl and steel halfpipe ramp were torn down in the Fall of 1997, and the newly constructed skate park opened on the same site in July 1998. The park has held the National Dew Tour for several years.

== Government ==
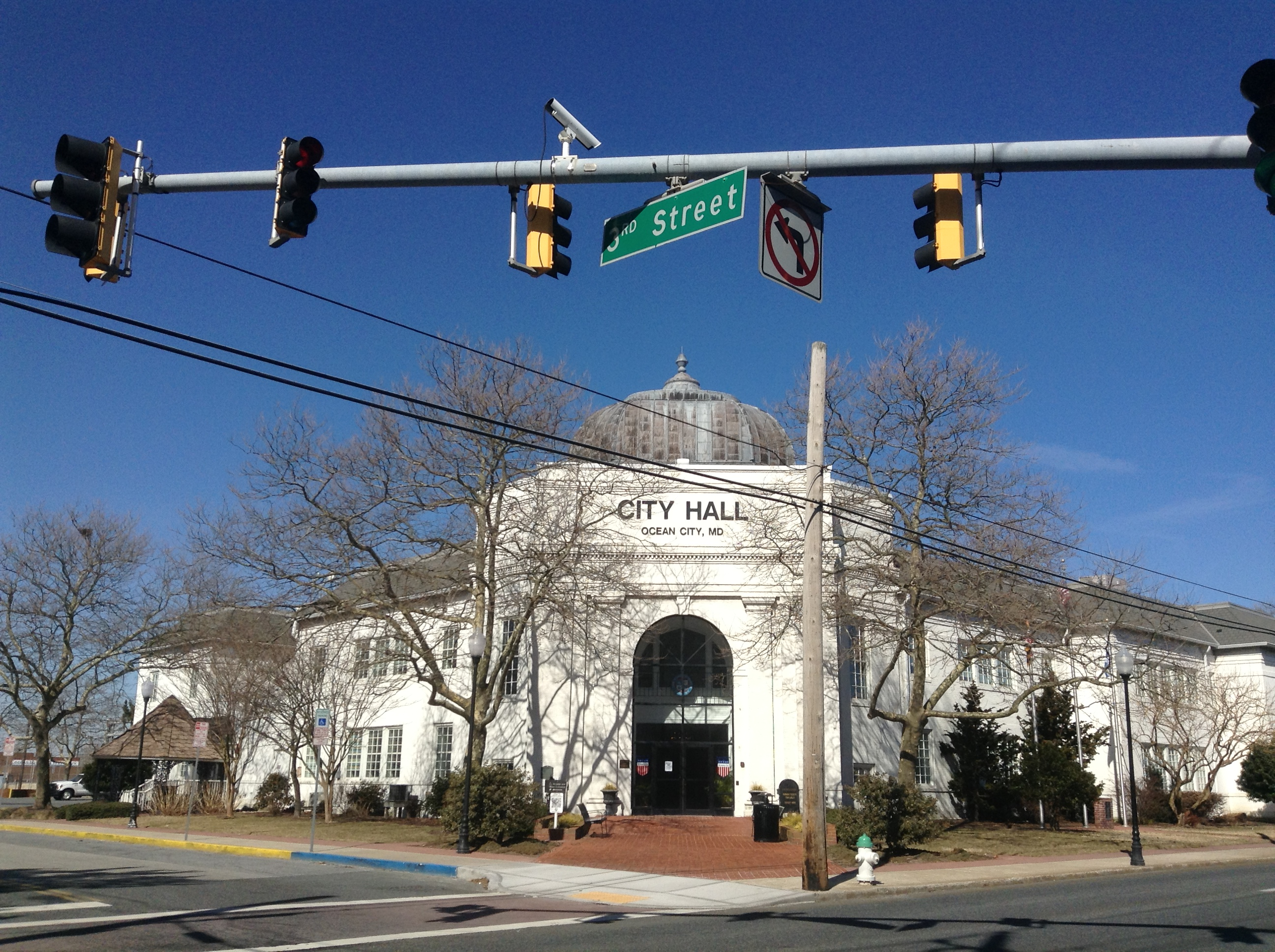
City Hall of Ocean City, located in the former Ocean City High School

Ocean City has a council-manager system of government with a mayor and a seven-member city council. The mayor is elected at-large to two-year terms, while the city council is elected at-large to staggered four-year terms. The city council elects a council president who presides over and sets the agenda for city council meetings. The mayor represents the town to state and local agencies. Both the mayor and the city council hire a city manager who oversees all daily operations of the town and serves as its chief financial officer. As of 2026, the mayor of Ocean City is Matthew James, and the members of city council are council president Carol Proctor, council secretary Jake Mitrecic, John Gehrig Jr., Peter Buas, Jeff Heiser, Billy Apostolou, and Larry Noccolino.

== Media ==
=== Radio ===
Ocean City has an emergency advisory radio system broadcast on two FM frequencies.

WOCM broadcasts from studios located at the popular restaurant, nightclub, distillery, and entertainment venue Seacrets. The call letters stand for "We are Ocean City Maryland".

Music

Ocean City is mentioned in the Car Seat Headrest song “Beach Life-In-Death”.

== Infrastructure ==
=== Transportation ===
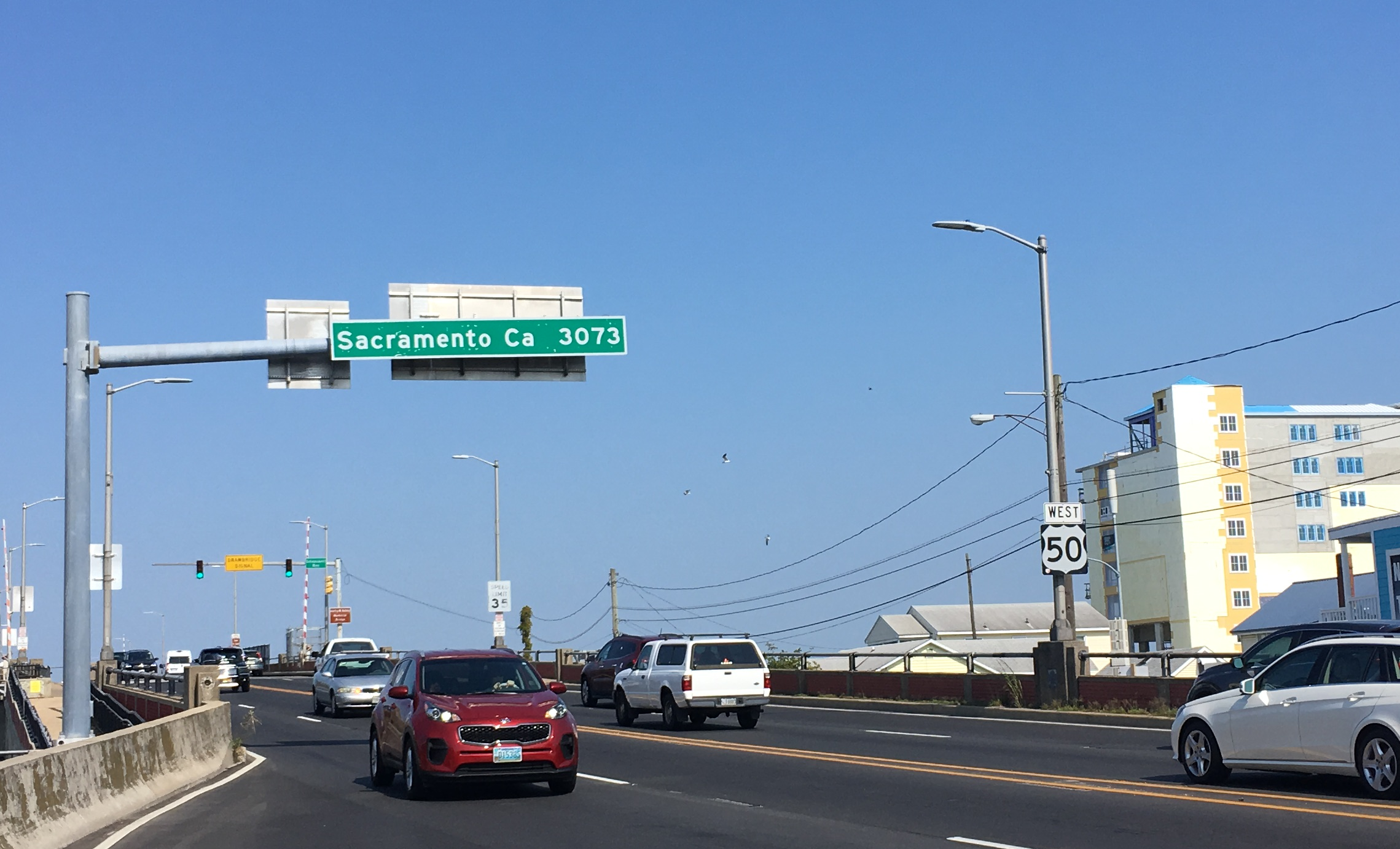
U.S. Route 50, also known as Ocean Gateway, leaving Ocean City; the sign over the eastbound lane displays the distance to the western terminus of the route in Sacramento, California, as 3,073 miles (4,946 km).

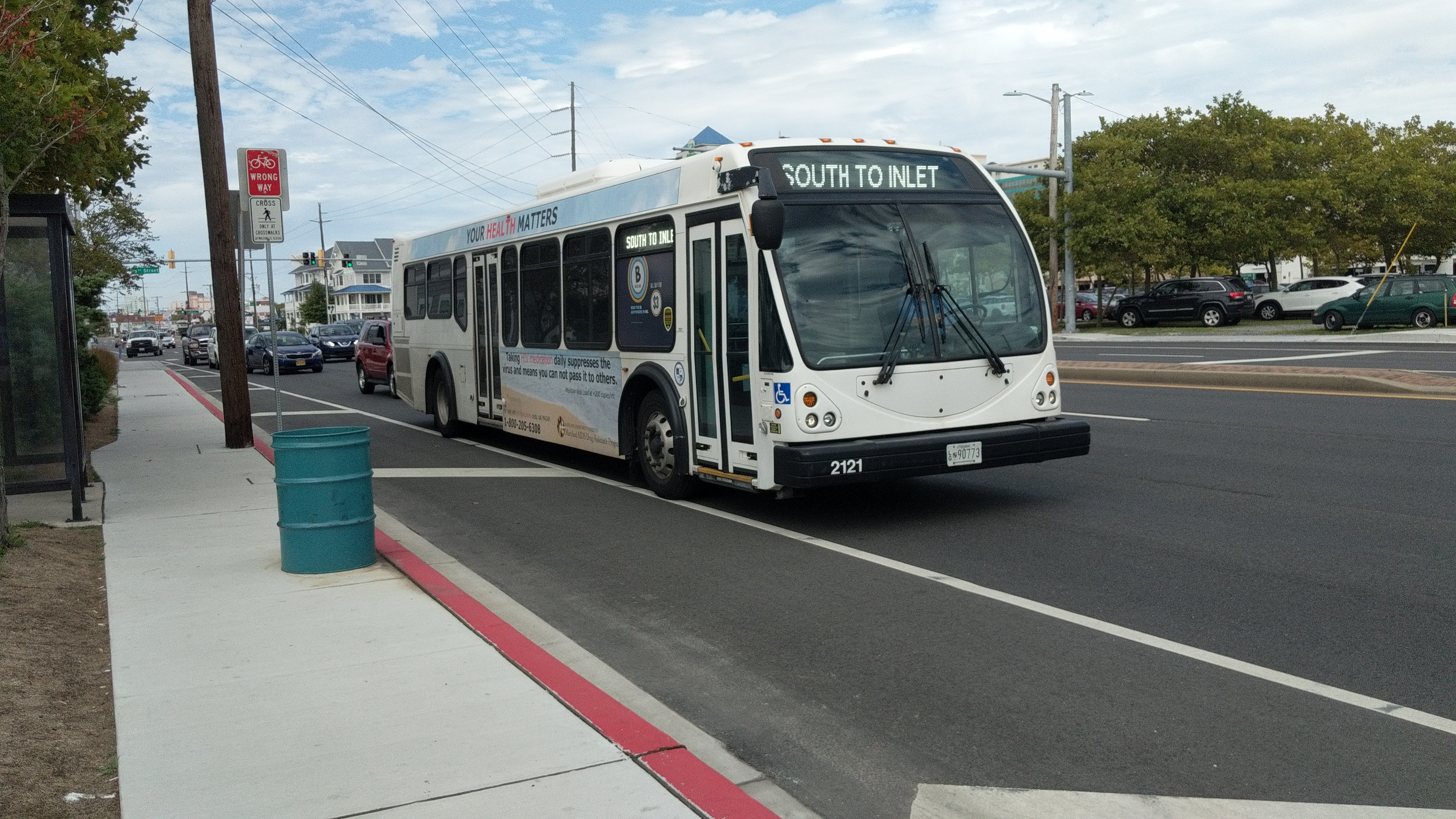
Coastal Highway Beach Bus

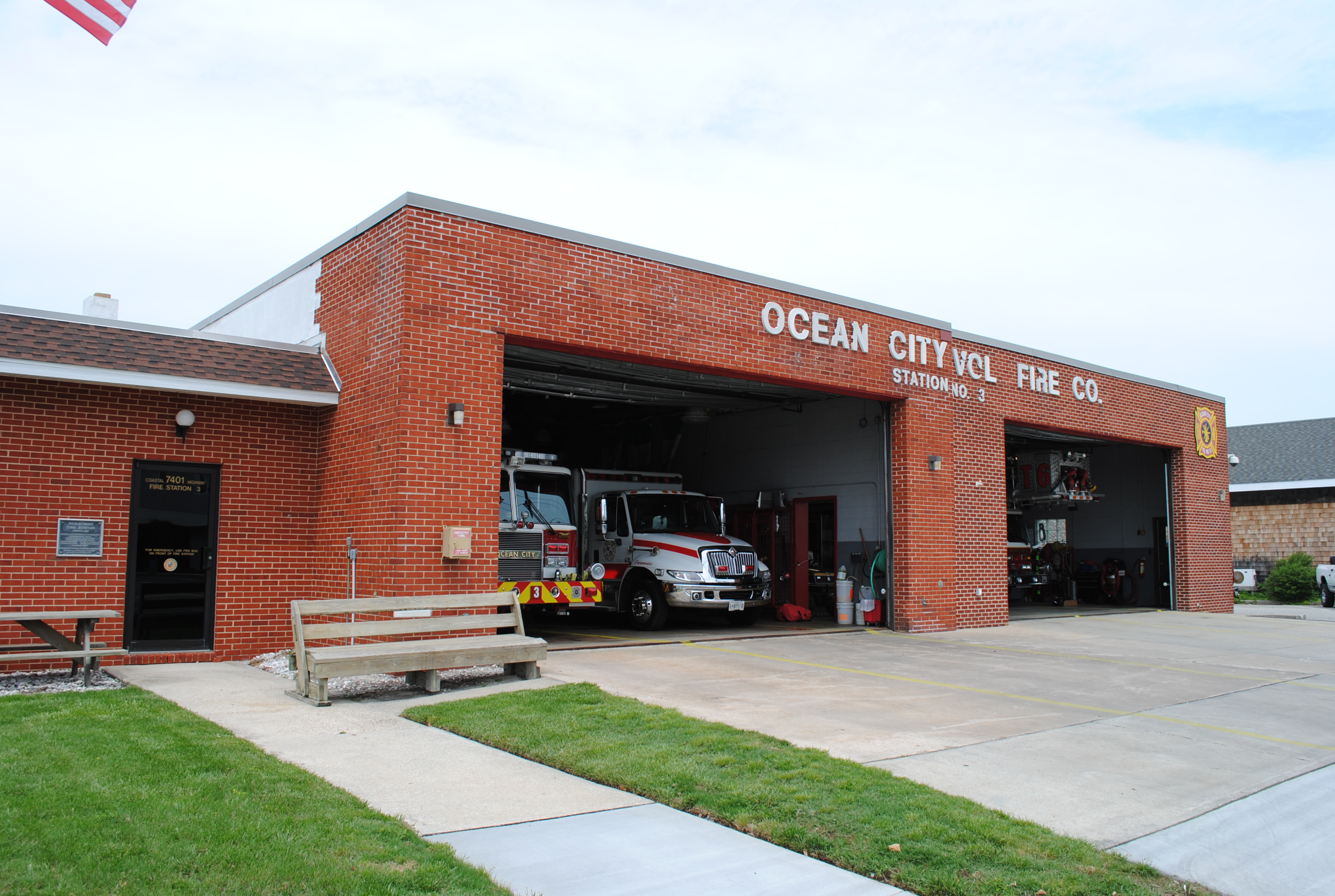
Ocean City Fire Department station

==== Road and bridges ====
Ocean City has a single major north−south thoroughfare, Maryland Route 528, known as the Coastal Highway for most of its length. Two bridges connect the mainland to Ocean City:

- US 50, also known as Ocean Gateway, crosses the Harry W. Kelley Memorial Bridge. Ocean City is the eastern terminus of US 50.
- MD 90 (Ocean City Expressway), crosses the Assawoman Bay Bridge.

==== Public transit ====
Ocean City also has a public transportation system called Ocean City Transportation. This agency operates the Coastal Highway Beach Bus, the West Ocean City Park-N-Ride Beach Bus, the Express Beach Bus for special events, and a trackless train shuttle called the Boardwalk Tram. Ocean City Transportation also offers paratransit service. The Boardwalk Tram operated during the summer months along the entire length of the Ocean City Boardwalk, but was closed due to an accident in 2024.

Ocean City's transit service connects with Shore Transit, which connects with other destinations.

From May to September, the DART First State Beach Bus connects with the Coastal Highway Beach Bus.

Ocean City Municipal Airport, located 3 miles (4.8 km) west of downtown Ocean City serves general aviation and charter aircraft.

=== Utilities ===
Delmarva Power, a subsidiary of Exelon, provides electricity to Ocean City. Sandpiper Energy, a subsidiary of Chesapeake Utilities, provides natural gas to the town. The Town of Ocean City Municipal Water Department provides water to the town, operating 25 wells, 3 treatment plants, 6 above-ground storage tanks, and an underground storage tank. The Public Works department provides wastewater service to Ocean City, operating the Ocean City Wastewater Treatment Plant. Trash and recycling collection in Ocean City is handled by the Public Works department, with the town's trash transported by Reworld to the Energy Resource Recovery Facility in Fairfax, Virginia, a waste-to-energy plant.

=== Police and fire department ===
Police services in Ocean City are provided by the Ocean City Police Department, which consists of 105 full-time officers and 100 to 110 seasonal officers. Fire protection in Ocean City is provided by the Ocean City Fire Department, which consists of over 200 volunteer members and over 100 career members.

== Notable people ==
- Spiro Agnew, former U.S. vice president
- Carmen M. Amedori, Maryland State Delegate, actor, author, former journalist
- Charles L. Calhoun, first Master Chief Petty Officer of the Coast Guard
- Devin Dodson, racing driver
- James N. Mathias Jr., Maryland state senator, and former mayor
- Erica Messer, television writer
- Michael Sorce, former radio talk show host known by his on-air name Don Geronimo

== Sister cities ==
Ocean City has three sister cities:

- Finale Ligure, Italy
- Pärnu, Estonia
- Rehoboth Beach, Delaware, U.S.

Preceded by Fenwick Island, Delaware	Beaches of Delmarva	Succeeded by Assateague Island
