= Maryland Route 452 =

State highway in Maryland, United States

Maryland Route 452
- Friendship Road

Route information
- Maintained by MDSHA
- Length: 1.64 mi (2.64 km)
- Existed: 1933–present

Major junctions
- South end: US 50 near Berlin
- MD 707 near Berlin
- North end: MD 575 in Friendship

Location
- Country: United States
- State: Maryland
- Counties: Worcester

Highway system
- Maryland highway system; Interstate; US; State; Scenic Byways
← MD 450	→ MD 454

Maryland Route 452 (MD 452) is a state highway in the U.S. state of Maryland. Known as Friendship Road, the state highway runs 1.64 miles (2.64 km) from U.S. Route 50 (US 50) near Berlin north to MD 575 in Friendship in northern Worcester County. MD 452 was built as a cut-off between US 213 (now US 50) and US 113 (now MD 575) in the early 1930s.

== Route description ==
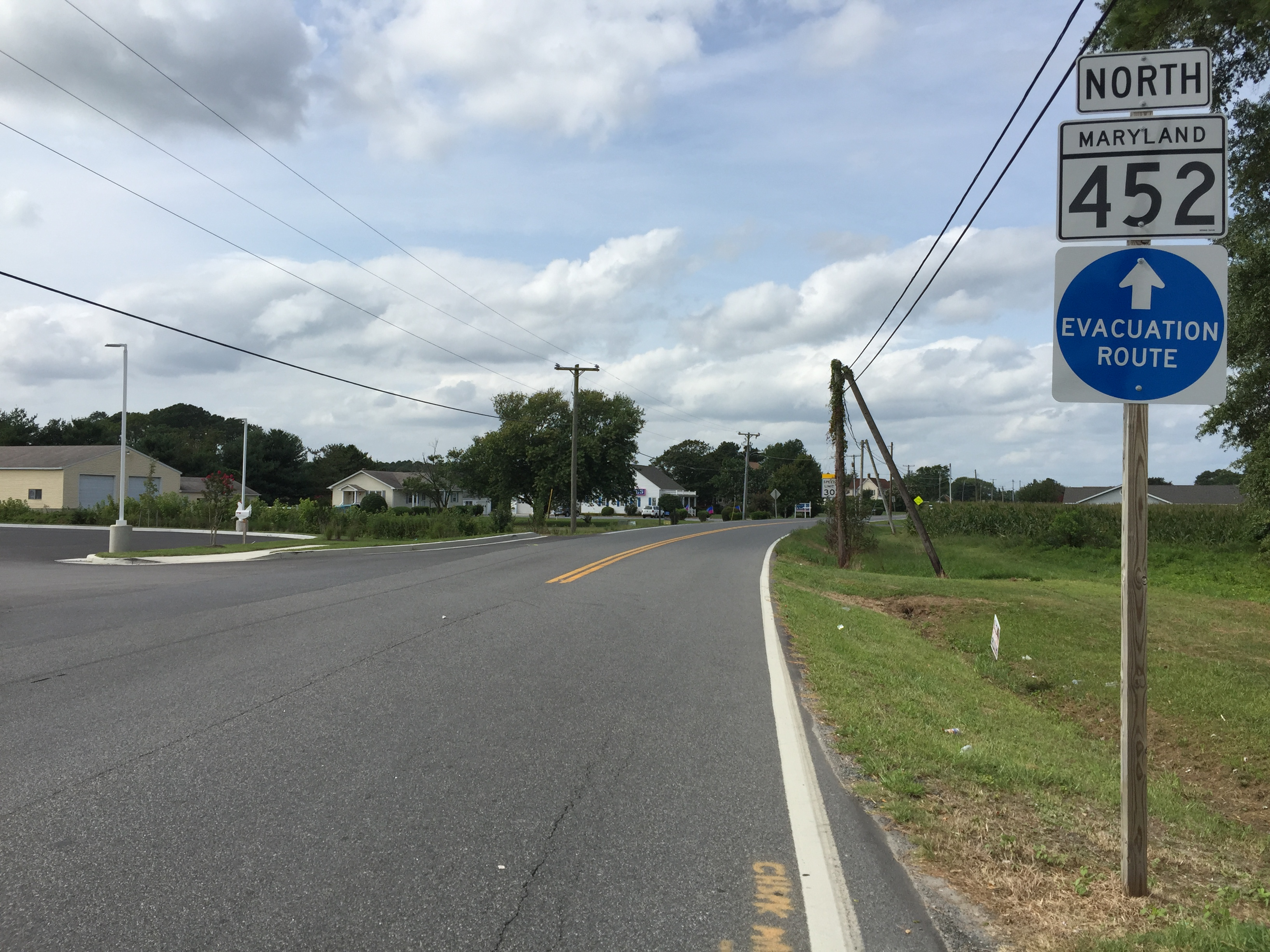
View north along MD 452 at MD 707 near Berlin

MD 452 begins at an intersection with US 50 (Ocean Gateway) to the northeast of Berlin. Seahawk Road continues south from the intersection, providing access to Stephen Decatur High School and Stephen Decatur Middle School. MD 452 immediately encounters the west end of MD 707 (Grays Corner Road), which was formerly US 213. The state highway heads north as a two-lane undivided road through a mix of farms and residences, crossing Taylorville Creek. MD 452 reaches its northern terminus at MD 575 (Worcester Highway), the old alignment of US 113, in the hamlet of Friendship.

== History ==
MD 452 was constructed between 1930 and 1933 from US 213 (now MD 707) to US 113 (now MD 575). The state highway was extended south a short distance to its present terminus when the US 50 divided highway was completed in 1950.

== Junction list ==
The entire route is in Worcester County.

Location	mi	km	Destinations	Notes
Berlin	0.00	0.00	US 50 (Ocean Gateway) / Seahawk Road south – Salisbury, Ocean City	Southern terminus
Berlin	0.02	0.032	MD 707 (Grays Corner Road)	Officially MD 707B
Friendship	1.64	2.64	MD 575 (Worcester Highway) – Showell, Ocean Pines	Northern terminus
1.000 mi = 1.609 km; 1.000 km = 0.621 mi
