= Maryland Route 575 =

State highway in Maryland, United States

Maryland Route 575
- Worcester Highway
- Maryland Route 575 highlighted in red

Route information
- Maintained by MDSHA
- Length: 2.70 mi (4.35 km)
- Existed: 2000–present

Major junctions
- South end: US 113 near Friendship
- MD 452 at Friendship
- North end: US 113 / MD 589 in Showell

Location
- Country: United States
- State: Maryland
- Counties: Worcester

Highway system
- Maryland highway system; Interstate; US; State; Scenic Byways
← MD 570	→ MD 577

Maryland Route 575 (MD 575) is a state highway in the U.S. state of Maryland. Known as Worcester Highway, the state highway runs 2.70 miles (4.35 km) from U.S. Route 113 (US 113) in Friendship north to MD 589 and US 113 in Showell. MD 575 is the old alignment of US 113 in northern Worcester County. The state highway was assigned in 2000 when US 113 was relocated as a four-lane divided highway through the area. As part of the overall project to expand US 113 to four lanes from Berlin to the Delaware state line, 14 unsigned auxiliary routes of MD 575 were designated on old alignments or service roads between 2002 and 2004.

== Route description ==
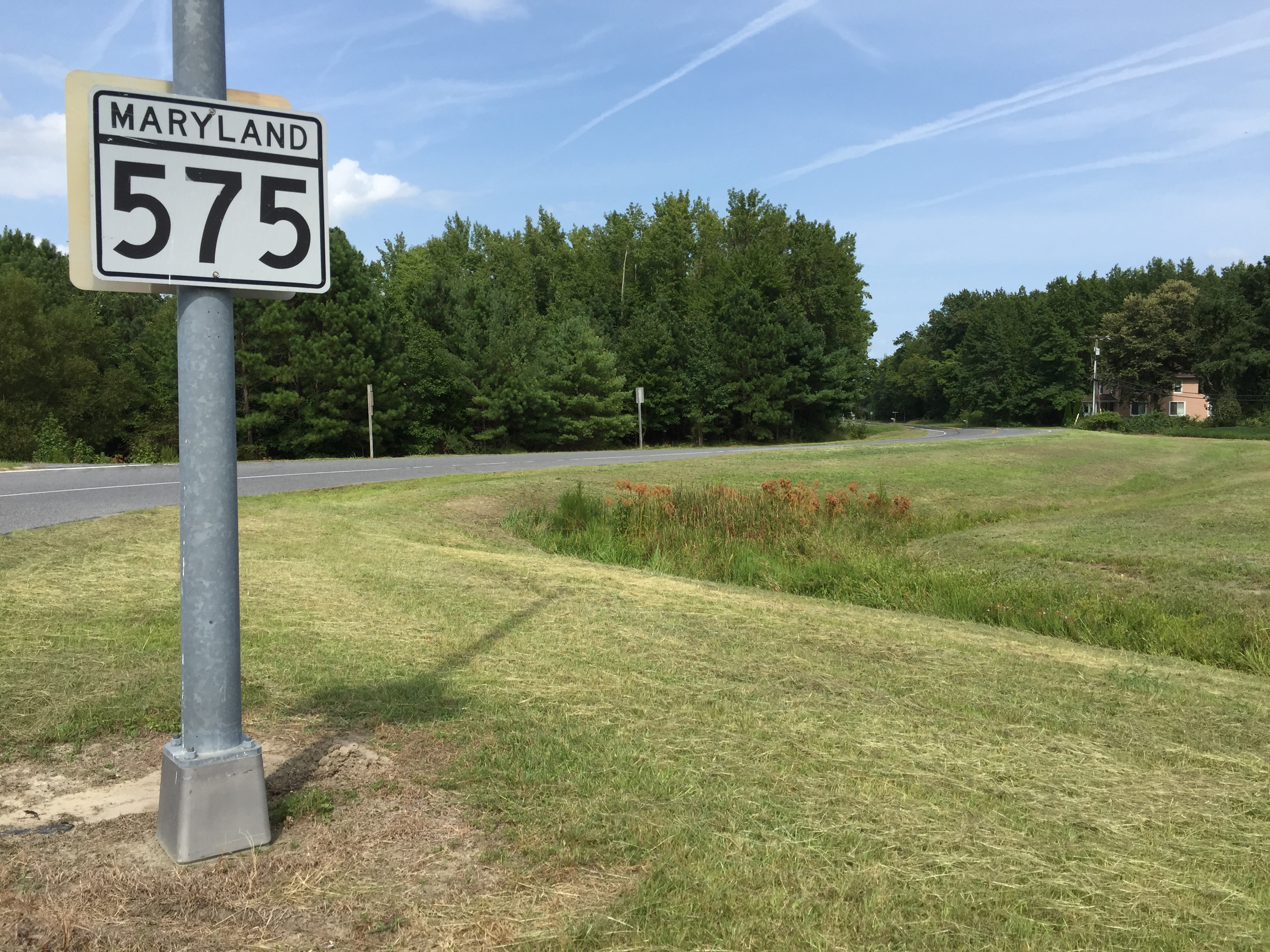
View north at the south end of MD 575 st US 113 near Friendship

MD 575 begins at a right-in/right-out interchange with northbound US 113, also known as Worcester Highway, in Friendship. There is no access to southbound US 113. MD 575 heads northeast as a two-lane undivided road through farmland. The state highway turns north after intersecting MD 452 (Friendship Road) and passing Carey Road. MD 575 passes under MD 90 (Ocean City Expressway) with no access. The state highway receives an off-ramp from northbound US 113 before reaching its northern terminus at MD 589 (Racetrack Road). Access to southbound US 113 is provided by heading west on MD 589, while a ramp to northbound US 113 continues straight.

== History ==
MD 575 is the old alignment of US 113 between Friendship and Showell. The state highway was originally constructed by 1921 and designated part of US 113 in 1927. This stretch was bypassed in 2000 as part of a larger project to expand US 113 to a four-lane divided highway between the existing northern end of dual highway just north of US 50 in Berlin and the Delaware state line. In 2000, a ramp from westbound MD 90 to MD 575 was closed when MD 90's current partial cloverleaf interchange with US 113 opened. MD 589 and MD 575 were realigned to their present termini in 2001. All portions of US 113's interchange with MD 589 and MD 575 were completed in 2002.

== Junction list ==
The entire route is in Worcester County.

Location	mi	km	Destinations	Notes
Friendship	0.00	0.00	US 113 north (Worcester Highway)	Southern terminus; right-in/right-out interchange with northbound US 113; no access to southbound US 113
Friendship	0.82	1.32	MD 452 south (Friendship Road)	
Showell	2.70	4.35	MD 589 (Racetrack Road) to US 113 – Ocean Pines, Berlin, Selbyville	Northern terminus; ramp to northbound US 113 continues north
1.000 mi = 1.609 km; 1.000 km = 0.621 mi: Incomplete access

== Auxiliary routes ==
Auxiliary routes of MD 575 were designated between 2002 and 2004 as portions of the project to expand US 113 to a divided highway were completed. These routes are either old alignments of US 113 or service roads to provide access to private property or county highways compromised by the construction of the four-lane divided highway. Fourteen auxiliary routes were established, increasing in alphabetical order geographically from MD 575A in Showell to MD 575N just south of the Delaware state line. MD 575A through MD 575F were assigned in 2002 as the US 113 divided highway reached Jarvis Road (MD 575F). MD 575G through MD 575J and MD 575M were established in 2003 when the divided highway was completed to the state line. MD 575K, MD 575L, and MD 575N were designated in 2004 to bring the overall project to a close.

- MD 575A is the designation for West Frontage Road, a 0.53-mile (0.85 km) highway that is the old alignment of US 113 on the west side of the present highway in Showell. The state highway begins at the entrance ramp to southbound US 113 and runs north to and includes the exit ramp from southbound US 113. MD 575A features turnaround ramps at both ends of the two-way portion just before the ramps from US 113 and intersects the western terminus of MD 589 in the middle.
- MD 575B is the designation for Old US 113, a 0.86-mile (1.38 km) highway that is the old alignment of US 113 on the west side of the present highway in Showell, to the north of MD 575A. The state highway begins at a right-in/right-out interchange with southbound US 113 and heads north to a cul-de-sac. MD 575B has an intersection with Pitts Road, a crossing of Birch Branch, and an intersection with MD 575D.
- MD 575C is the designation for a 0.10 mi (0.16 km) stretch of Shingle Landing Road on the east side of US 113 in Showell opposite MD 575D.
- MD 575D is the designation for a 0.08-mile (0.13 km) stretch of Peerless Road on the west side of US 113 in Showell opposite MD 575C. MD 575D serves as a connector between both directions of US 113 and MD 575B.
- MD 575E is the designation for a 0.14-mile (0.23 km) stretch of Danzi Road on the east side of US 113 north of Showell.
- MD 575F is the designation for a 0.11-mile (0.18 km) stretch of Jarvis Road on the east side of US 113 north of Showell.
- MD 575G is the designation for a 0.05-mile (0.080 km) stretch of Kepler Lane that runs west from a directional crossover intersection with US 113 south of Bishop. The state highway provides access to industrial facilities as well as MD 575H.
- MD 575H is the designation for Service Road A, a 0.32-mile (0.51 km) service road that runs from MD 575G north paralleling US 113 to a cul-de-sac.
- MD 575I is the designation for Service Road B, a 0.11-mile (0.18 km) service road that runs from a right-in/right-out interchange with northbound US 113 east to a cul-de-sac south of Bishop.
- MD 575J is the designation for Service Road C, a 0.13-mile (0.21 km) service road that runs from a right-in/right-out interchange with northbound US 113 east and then north to a cul-de-sac north of Bishop, just south of US 113's grade crossing of the Snow Hill Line of the Maryland and Delaware Railroad.
- MD 575K is the designation for Service Road E, a 0.12-mile (0.19 km) service road that runs from a right-in/right-out interchange with southbound US 113 west and then south to a cul-de-sac north of Bishop, just north of US 113's grade crossing of the railroad.
- MD 575L is the designation for a 0.08-mile (0.13 km) stretch of Hammond Road that runs from US 113's intersection with MD 610 (Whaleyville Road) east to between the intersection with MD 575M and the railroad crossing.
- MD 575M is the designation for Handy Lane, a 0.28-mile (0.45 km) service road that runs from MD 575L north to a cul-de-sac adjacent to northbound US 113.
- MD 575N is the designation for Church Road, a 0.05-mile (0.080 km) service road that runs from a right-in/right-out interchange with southbound US 113 just south of the Delaware state line west to the parking lot for a church.
