= Maryland Route 589 =

State highway in Maryland, United States

Maryland Route 589
- Racetrack Road
- Maryland Route 589 highlighted in red

Route information
- Maintained by MDSHA
- Length: 4.65 mi (7.48 km)
- Existed: 1935–present

Major junctions
- South end: US 50 at Grays Corner
- MD 707 at Grays Corner; MD 90 in Ocean Pines
- North end: US 113 / MD 575 in Showell

Location
- Country: United States
- State: Maryland
- Counties: Worcester

Highway system
- Maryland highway system; Interstate; US; State; Scenic Byways
← MD 588	→ MD 591

Maryland Route 589 (MD 589) is a state highway in the U.S. state of Maryland. Known as Racetrack Road, the state highway runs 4.65 miles (7.48 km) from U.S. Route 50 (US 50) at Grays Corner north to US 113 and MD 575 in Showell. MD 589 provides access to the planned community of Ocean Pines and Ocean Downs, a harness racing venue with a casino. The first portion of the state highway was constructed through Showell in 1935. MD 589 was completed to US 50 in 1949 and 1950.

== Route description ==
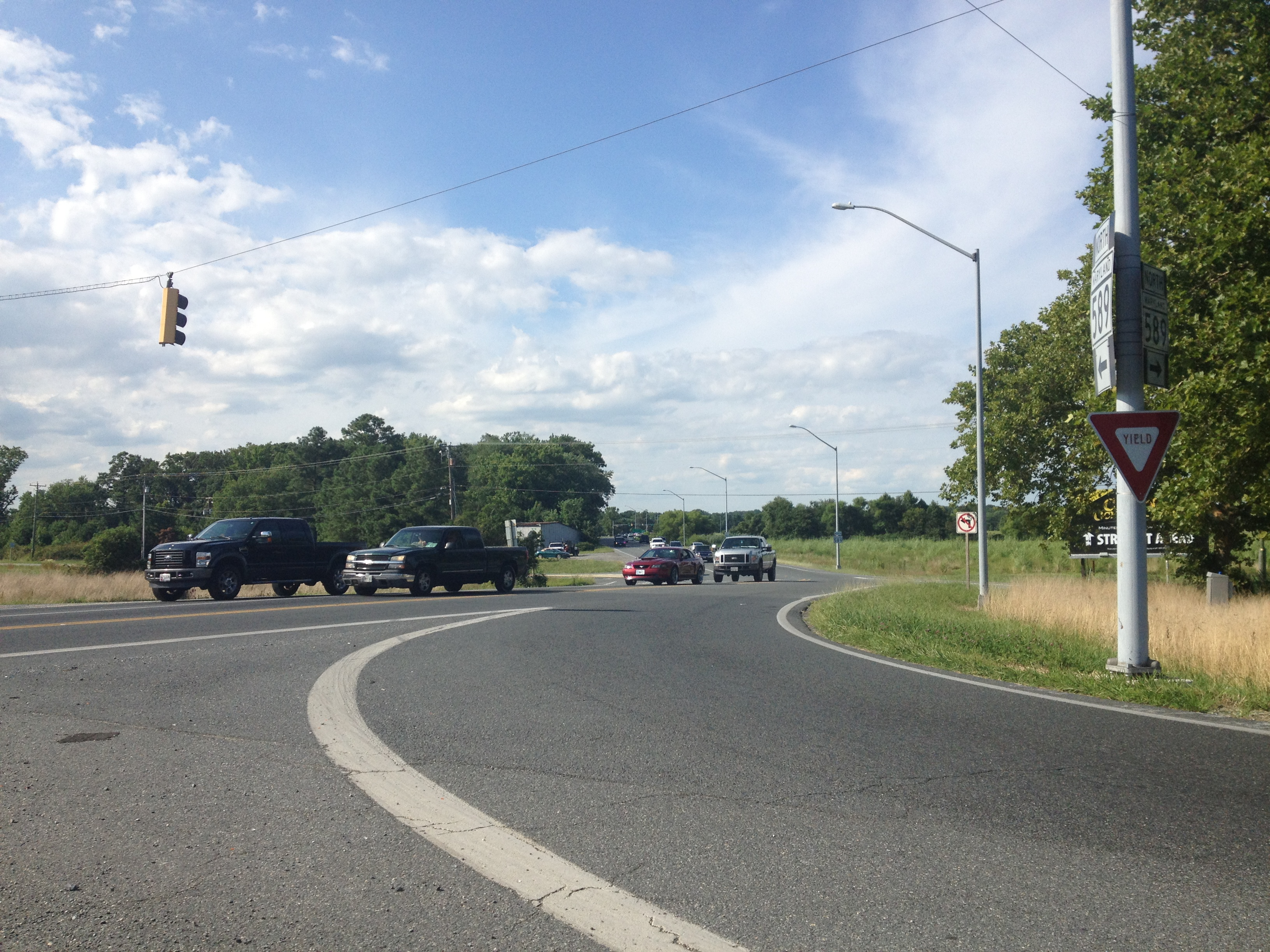
MD 589 northbound past US 50 in Grays Corner

MD 589 begins at an intersection with US 50 (Ocean Gateway) at Grays Corner. The state highway immediately encounters MD 707 (Grays Corner Road); the highway is officially MD 707B to the west and MD 707E to the east of the intersection. MD 589 heads north as a three-lane undivided road with one lane northbound and two lanes southbound. After passing west of Ocean Downs, the southbound direction reduces to one lane. MD 589 crosses Taylorville Creek and passes through the hamlet of Taylorville. The state highway enters a commercial area and intersects Manklin Creek Road, which is the main access to Ocean Pines to the east. MD 589 curves northwest, then expands to a three-lane road with a center left-turn lane before passing another entrance to the Ocean Pines development and meeting MD 90 (Ocean City Expressway) at a diamond interchange.

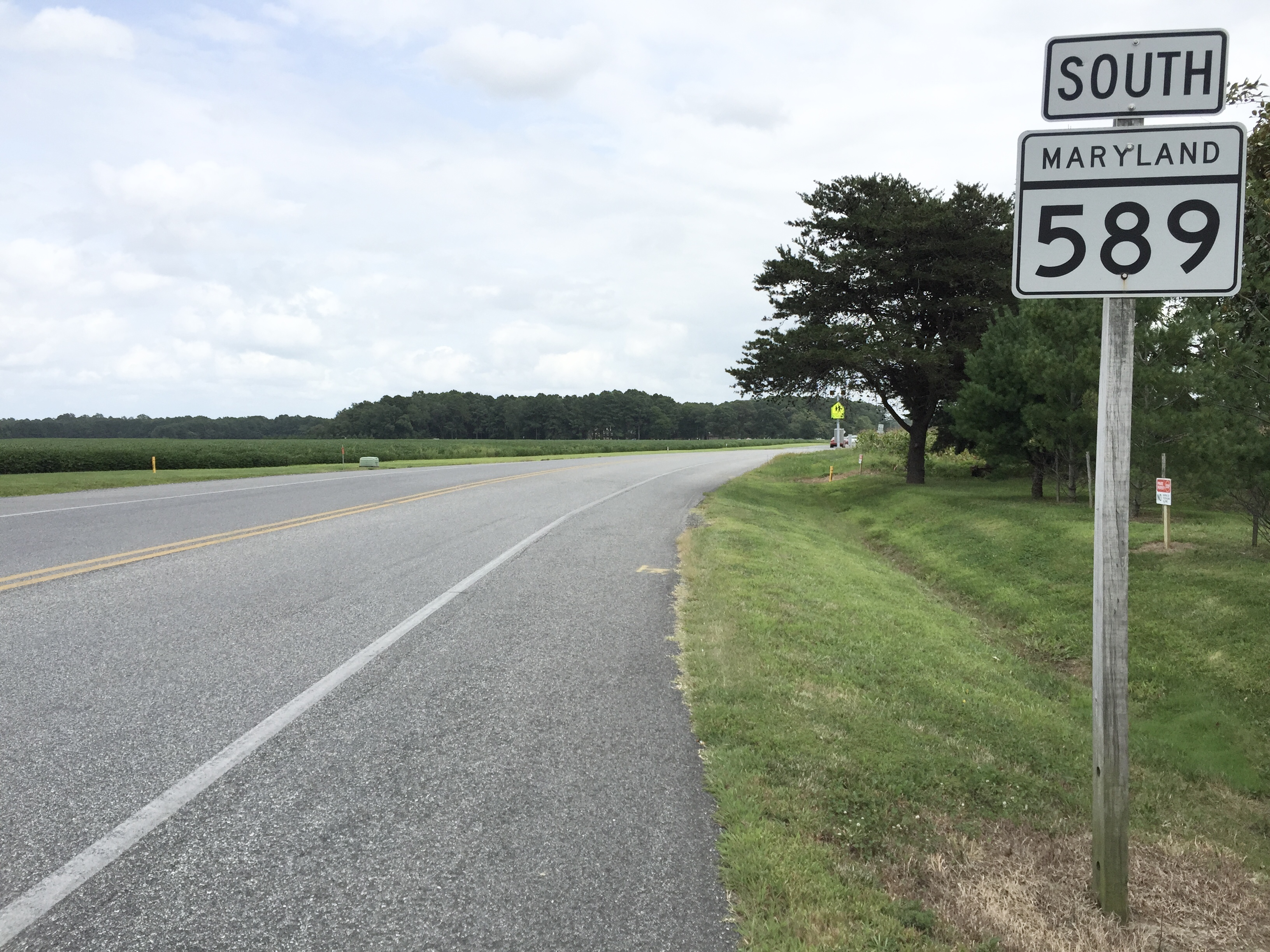
View south along MD 589 just south of US 113 in Showell

MD 589 returns to two lanes after passing Ocean Parkway, the main arterial through Ocean Pines. The state highway continues west to its junction with US 113 and MD 575, both named Worcester Highway, in Showell. The first intersection features a ramp to US 113 north and sees MD 575 head south; the ramp from US 113 north intersects MD 575 a short distance to the south. After passing under US 113, MD 589 reaches its northern terminus at West Frontage Road, which is unsigned MD 575A. Ramps from and to US 113 south are located at the northern and southern ends of MD 575A, respectively.

== History ==
The first section of MD 589 was constructed between US 113 and Beauchamp Road in 1935. The state highway was extended south and east to US 50 in two segments. The first segment, from Beauchamp Road to north of Taylorville, was constructed in 1949. The remainder of MD 589 to US 50 was completed in 1950. The northern end of the highway was realigned in 2000 to accommodate the expansion of US 113 through the area. MD 589's interchange with US 113 was completed in 2002.

== Junction list ==
The entire route is in Worcester County.

Location	mi	km	Destinations	Notes
Grays Corner	0.00	0.00	US 50 (Ocean Gateway) – Ocean City, Salisbury	Southern terminus
Grays Corner	0.04	0.064	MD 707 (Grays Corner Road)	Officially MD 707B to west and MD 707E to east
Ocean Pines	2.63	4.23	MD 90 (Ocean City Expressway) – Salisbury, Ocean City	Diamond interchange
Showell	4.56	7.34	US 113 north (Worcester Highway) / MD 575 south – Selbyville	Interchange
Showell	4.65	7.48	West Frontage Road to US 113 south – Berlin	Northern terminus; West Frontage Road is unsigned MD 575A
1.000 mi = 1.609 km; 1.000 km = 0.621 mi
