= Maryland Route 707 =

State highway in Maryland, United States

Maryland Route 707
- Maryland Route 707 highlighted in red

Route information
- Maintained by MDSHA
- Existed: 1948–present

Location
- Country: United States
- State: Maryland
- Counties: Worcester

Highway system
- Maryland highway system; Interstate; US; State; Scenic Byways
← MD 704	→ MD 710

Maryland Route 707 (MD 707) is a collection of state highways in the U.S. state of Maryland. These four highways are sections of the old alignment of U.S. Route 213 (US 213, now US 50) in northeastern Worcester County. These stretches of highway were bypassed and designated part of MD 707 in the early 1940s in West Ocean City and in the late 1940s in Grays Corner.

== Route description ==
MD 707A, which is known as Old Bridge Road, runs 0.79 miles (1.27 km) from US 50 to MD 611 within West Ocean City. MD 707B, MD 707E, and MD 707D, which are both known as Grays Corner Road, run 1.44 miles (2.32 km), 0.76 miles (1.22 km) and 0.76 miles (1.22 km), respectively, within Grays Corner.

=== MD 707A ===
MD 707A begins at an intersection with US 50 (Ocean Gateway) just east of Herring Creek in West Ocean City. The state highway heads east as a two-lane undivided road. After passing by residential subdivisions, MD 707A reaches its eastern terminus at MD 611 (Stephen Decatur Highway). Old Bridge Road continues east as a county highway to Sinepuxent Bay where the old bridge crossed into Ocean City in line with Worcester Street.

=== MD 707B and MD 707E ===
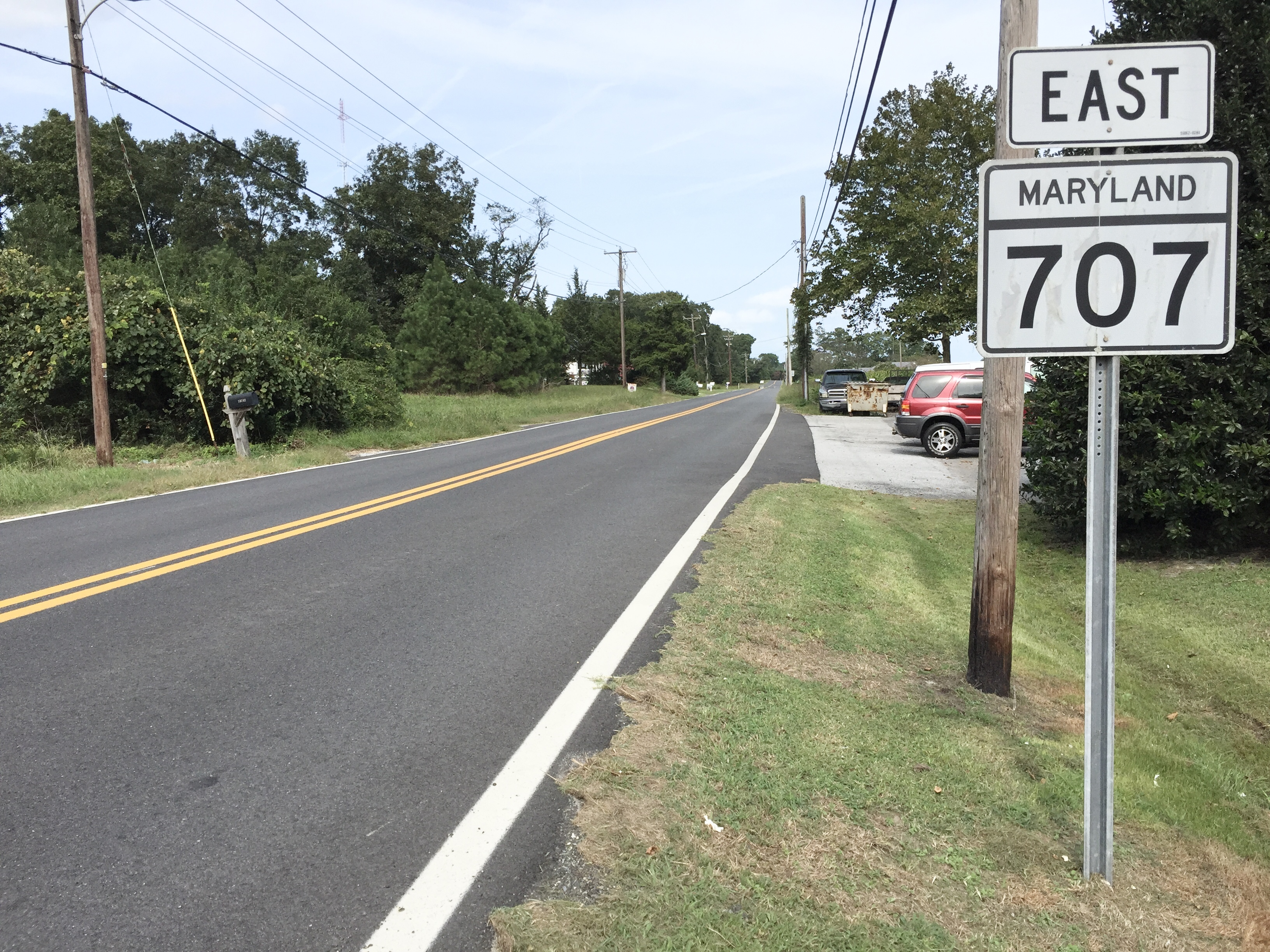
View east along MD 707B at MD 452 in Grays Corner

MD 707B begins at a dead end near Berlin, adjacent to US 50. The state highway heads east and immediately encounters MD 452. The state highway continues east as a two-lane undivided road paralleling US 50 on the north at a distance, passing farms and residences. At the intersection with MD 589 (Racetrack Road) in Grays Corner, access across is restricted, with MD 707B ending and MD 707E beginning. MD 707E parallels US 50 closely until the end of state maintenance just west of Riddle Lane, which is unsigned US 50WA.

=== MD 707D ===
MD 707D begins at a cul-de-sac adjacent to US 50 a short distance east of the eastern terminus of MD 707B. The state highway heads east as a two-lane undivided road paralleling US 50 on the north from a distance and connects with the federal highway via Herring Creek Lane and an unnamed road, which are designated US 50WB and US 50WC, respectively. MD 707D reaches its eastern terminus at a dead end adjacent to US 50 a short distance west of Herring Creek.

== History ==
What is now MD 707 is much of the original alignment of the Berlin–Ocean City road that was paved east to West Ocean City in 1915. The highway was completed when the first automobile bridge across Sinepuxent Bay opened in 1916. The highway was designated the easternmost part of US 213 in 1927. Present day MD 707A was bypassed in 1942 when the present bridge to Ocean City and the dual highway approach west to Herring Creek opened. The bypassed portion of US 213 remained a state highway and was designated MD 707 by 1948. The segment of MD 707 west of Herring Creek was bypassed in 1950 when the dual highway, which had just been renumbered US 50, was extended to just west of MD 452. MD 707A's eastern terminus was rolled back from Sinepuxent Bay to MD 611 in 2001. In 2003, MD 707B was split by construction of an entrance to the Glen Riddle Golf Club subdivision, resulting in the portion east of the split being redesignated MD 707D. In 2011, access across MD 589 was restricted, and the portion of MD 707B east of there became MD 707E.

== Junction list ==
All four sections of MD 707 are entirely in Worcester County.

=== Old Bridge Road ===
The entire route is in West Ocean City.

mi	km	Destinations	Notes
0.00	0.00	US 50 (Ocean Gateway) – Salisbury, Ocean City	Western terminus of MD 707A
0.79	1.27	MD 611 (Stephen Decatur Highway) / Old Bridge Road east – Assateague Island Parks	Eastern terminus of MD 707A; Old Bridge Road to the east was formerly part of MD 707A
1.000 mi = 1.609 km; 1.000 km = 0.621 mi

=== Grays Corner Road ===
The entire route is in Grays Corner.

mi	km	Destinations	Notes
0.00	0.00	Dead end	Western terminus of MD 707B
0.07	0.11	MD 452 (Friendship Road) – Friendship	
1.44 0.00	2.32 0.00	MD 589 (Racetrack Road) – Ocean Pines	Eastern terminus of MD 707B; western terminus of MD 707E
0.76	1.22	Grays Corner Road east to Riddle Lane	Eastern terminus of MD 707E; Riddle Lane is unsigned US 50WA
Break in highway between MD 707B and MD 707D
0.00	0.00	Cul-de-sac	Western terminus of MD 707D
0.49	0.79	Herring Creek Lane	Unsigned US 50WB
0.69	1.11	To US 50	Unsigned US 50WC
0.76	1.22	Dead end	Eastern terminus of MD 707D
1.000 mi = 1.609 km; 1.000 km = 0.621 mi
