= St. Martin's Episcopal Church =

St. Martin's Episcopal Church can refer to many churches in the United States:

- St. Martin's Episcopal Church (Houston, Texas), attended by George H.W. Bush and Barbara Bush
- St. Martin's Episcopal Church (Showell, Maryland)
- St. Martin's Episcopal Church (New York City), a designated New York City Landmark
