= Russell O. Hickman =

American politician and businessman (1908–1988)

Russell O. Hickman (February 5, 1908 – November 5, 1988) was an American politician and businessman.

== Biography ==
Born in Showell, Maryland, Hickman owned a small loan business. From 1955 to 1979, he served in the Maryland House of Delegates as a Democrat, first representing Worcester County, then district 36. He died in Berlin, Maryland on November 5, 1988, at the age of 80.
