= Friendship, Maryland =

Friendship, Maryland may refer to the following places in Maryland:

- Friendship, Anne Arundel County, Maryland
- Friendship, Worcester County, Maryland
