= Bishopville (disambiguation) =

Bishopville may refer to a location in the United States:

- Bishopville, Maryland, an unincorporated place
- Bishopville, South Carolina, a town
  - The Bishopville meteorite of 1843 (see Meteorite falls)
