= Chaptico =

Group of Native Americans

Cecomocomoco

Total population
- Extinct as a tribe

Regions with significant populations
- Southwestern Shore of Chesapeake Bay

Languages
- Eastern Algonquian

Religion
- Native American religion

Related ethnic groups
- Patuxent people

The Chaptico, also known as the Cecomocomoco, were a group of Native Americans who lived along the Southwestern shore of the Chesapeake Bay in what is today St. Mary's County, Maryland. They were loosely dominated by the Patuxent in the pre-colonial time. While little is known about their culture, the Chaptico spoke an Algonquian language that was possibly similar to their Patuxent neighbors, who they absorbed in the 1690s.

== Sources ==
- Maryland: A Colonial History p. 22.
- Maryland.gov

== See also ==
- Chaptico, Maryland, a present-day community in the area
