= Boxiron, Maryland =

Unincorporated community in Maryland, United States

- Unincorporated community
- Location within Maryland
- Coordinates: 38°06′54″N 75°20′57″W
- Country: United States
- State: Maryland
- County: Worcester
- Elevation: 16 ft (4.9 m)
- Time zone: UTC-5 (Eastern (EST))
  - Summer (DST): UTC-4 (EDT)
- ZIP code: 21829
- Area codes: 410, 443, and 667
- GNIS feature ID: 588622

Boxiron is an unincorporated community in Worcester County, Maryland, United States. Boxiron is located at the intersection of Boxiron and Cherrix Lanes, southeast of Snow Hill.
