= Stephen A. Nash =

American serial killer (1924–1959)

- Nash, c. 1956
- Born: 1924; New York, U.S.
- Died: August 21, 1959 (aged 35); San Quentin State Prison, California, U.S.
- Status: Executed in the gas chamber
- Motive: Lust
- Conviction: Murder (x2)
- Penalty: Death

Details
- Victims: 5–11
- Date: 1955 – 1956
- Country: United States
- State: California
- Imprisoned at: San Quentin State Prison

Stephen A. Nash (1924 – August 21, 1959) was an American serial killer executed in California. Between 1955 and 1956, at varied locations in California, Nash claimed to have killed a total of 11 men and boys, all by stabbing. Police confirmed at least five victims through investigations. Nash's self-proclaimed motive(s) behind the murders were reportedly out of thrill and for sexual gratification. Nash was found guilty and sentenced to death for two of the murders, and he was executed in the gas chamber at the San Quentin State Prison on August 21, 1959.

== Early life ==
Stephen A. Nash, who was born in 1924, was adopted as a baby and raised by a couple from The Bronx, New York. During his childhood and youth, Nash ran away from home four times. In December 1951, Nash enlisted into the United States Air Force, but during his military service, Nash went AWOL twice and was therefore court-martialed on both occasions, and he was eventually discharged after he revealed his homosexuality. Apart from this, Nash also had an extensive criminal record dated back to 1943, when he was charged and imprisoned for various offences like robbery, grand theft and burglary. He was examined twice in 1948 and 1955 respectively by state psychiatrists but none of the diagnoses reported anything abnormal regarding Nash's mental state. Nash served six years between 1948 and 1954 at San Quentin State Prison for robbery, and a subsequent six months at Alameda County Jail for battery.

== Murders ==
Between 1955 and 1956, Stephen Nash committed multiple murders across different locations in California. While the police were able to confirm at least five victims, Nash himself had confessed to murdering a total of 11 men and boys.

=== Confirmed victims ===
William Burns

In December 1955, 23-year-old Santa Cruz resident William C. Burns encountered Nash, who battered him to death with a pipe in the hills of Hayward, California. Nash, who confessed to the killing, took off Burns's clothes and disposed of them at a ravine from a mountain road. Burns's body was later found floating in a bay.

Robert Eche

On August 18, 1956, in San Francisco, Nash killed 22-year-old Robert T. Eche, a native of San Francisco, by stabbing him eight times, and after the murder, Nash drove Eche's car to a pier, where he pushed both Eche's body and car into the waters of the bay.

Floyd Leroy Barnett

On October 3, 1956, in Sacramento, California, Nash stabbed and killed a transient named Floyd Leroy Barnett in a "hobo jungle" located in the area.

John William Berg

On November 26, 1956, in Long Beach, California, Nash first encountered John William Berg, a 27-year-old student beautician, when Berg approached him with romantic advances. While annoyed, Nash followed Berg into his apartment, mainly to get a place to spend the night. However, throughout the night, Berg reportedly pestered Nash with homosexual advances, and this continued in the next morning. Subsequently, Nash used a hunting knife to stab Berg once in the abdomen and six times in the throat. After the murder, Nash searched the apartment for money but failed to find any, and he left the apartment after putting on a suit belonging to Berg.

Larry Rice

On November 29, 1956, ten-year-old Lawrence "Larry" George Rice was playing on the Ocean Park beach in Los Angeles, when Nash approached him and bought him soft drinks and hamburgers, before they walked together along the beach. When Nash and Rice reached under the Santa Monica pier, the former wielded a knife and stabbed the boy multiple times, first inflicting several stab wounds in the abdomen before stabbing another 18 times in the back and slashing the buttocks. Nash had done the stabbing before and after stripping Rice of his clothes, and he departed after murdering the boy, who sustained more than 30 knife wounds on his body. According to Nash, he killed the boy out of sexual sadistic gratification, as well as to get back at society for the mistreatment he faced as a child.

=== Surviving victim ===
Apart from his 11 murder victims, Nash also attacked a 12th person, Dennis Butler, who survived. The incident took place on November 16, 1956, in the "skid row" of Los Angeles on November 16, 1956, where Nash met Butler in a bar. Butler, who had no money, was offered $5 by Nash in exchange for spending time together, and he agreed. They went to Nash's hotel room and drank whiskey, but Butler soon realized that Nash expected a sexual relationship and refused to go through with it. Butler fled the room, and Nash chased him for several blocks before catching up and demanding the return of the $5. When Butler refused to return to the hotel, Nash stabbed him in the abdomen with a hunting knife and forced him back toward the hotel lobby. Once inside, Butler shouted for help. A hotel clerk alerted authorities, but Nash kicked Butler twice, breaking his collarbone before he fled the scene. Butler ultimately survived the attack.

=== Suspected victims ===
Nash was named as a suspect behind several other murders, some of which he admitted to and some were unsolved murders believed to be committed by him. In one part of his confession, Nash admitted to killing a young man, whose name he claimed to not remember, in Oakland, California, and threw his body over a cliff. Nash was also believed to be the killer behind the unsolved death of Paul C. Check, a cook found slashed to death on September 23, 1956, in a hotel in Visalia, California. Nash was also named a suspect behind the 1954 unsolved murder of 12-year-old Danny Woods in Maine; Woods disappeared in July 1954 before his body was found floating in a river by two fishermen nine days later.

== Arrest, confession and charges ==
On the afternoon of November 29, 1956, hours after he murdered Larry Rice, Nash was arrested for an assault case, which was connected to the attack on Dennis Butler. After his arrest, Nash was found with a bloodstained knife, and he eventually confessed to murdering Rice.

At first, during the 11 days after his arrest, Nash confessed to killing five people, including Larry Rice and John Berg, before he admitted to a further six murders, putting his alleged total victim count to 11. While they were wary of the validity of his confessions, the police speculated that if all of Nash's claims were proven true, he would be the deadliest killer in Californian history. Additionally, Nash demanded a payment of $1,000 in exchange for further details on the additional six murders he confessed to, and San Francisco police inspector Al Nelder noted that Nash was "enjoying all this immensely". Nash also admitted at one point that he wanted to set up a one-man murder business and kill as much as ten to 20 victims per night.

On December 5, 1956, the Los Angeles district attorney's office sought to indict Nash for the murders of both Berg and Rice.

On December 17, 1956, Nash was extradited to San Francisco to be charged for the murder of Robert Eche, and he was indicted by a San Francisco grand jury.

On December 20, 1956, Nash, who returned to Los Angeles, pleaded not guilty to the murders and put up an insanity defence.

== Murder trial ==
In February 1957, Nash stood trial for both the murders of Rice and Berg before a Los Angeles jury, and in his opening statement, Deputy District Attorney J. Miller Leavy described the killings as "first-degree murder by torture". During one of the hearings, Nash openly proclaimed that the murder of Berg was one of the most satisfying ones he ever pulled off, and this reportedly led to Berg's brother angrily exchange heated words with Nash in the courtroom.

On February 27, 1957, Nash was found guilty of two counts of first-degree murder by the jury.

On the same day of his conviction, the jury voted to impose the death penalty on Nash, and declined to recommend any mercy with regards to the sentence, which mandated the death sentence in Nash's case.

On March 18, 1957, Nash was found to be mentally competent in a pre-sentencing psychiatric assessment, and the judge was set to sentence Nash on a date to be decided. Prior to this assessment, Nash withdrew his insanity plea.

On April 1, 1957, Superior Court Judge H. Burton Noble formally sentenced Nash to death in the gas chamber for the murders of Rice and Berg. During sentencing, Noble remarked that Nash was the "most evil person who ever appeared in my (Noble's) court".

== Death row and execution ==
After his sentencing, Stephen Nash was incarcerated on death row at the San Quentin State Prison. It was reported that throughout his two years on death row, Nash was friendless and shunned by all the other prisoners on death row, including those convicted of murder, as they hated him and felt sickened by his frequent boasting of all the murders he committed.

In April 1958, Nash was assaulted by Clifford Jefferson, a fellow death row inmate, during a morning exercise period, and the incident sparked due to Nash provoking Jefferson, who was on death row for assaulting a prison guard while serving his life sentence for the murders of a ten-year-old boy and a young man.

On April 24, 1959, the California Supreme Court dismissed Nash's appeal against his death sentence. Earlier on, Nash's lawyers argued for the court to reject the McNaughton Rule, which dictates that the defendant of a crime was not legally insane if he could differentiate right from wrong, but the argument was denied.

Eventually, Nash's execution was scheduled to be carried out on August 21, 1959. As a final recourse, Nash petitioned to the governor of California for clemency. However, Governor Pat Brown refused to commute Nash's death sentence to life imprisonment and hence denied him clemency. Brown released a statement in rejecting the clemency petition, "I am concerned that our laws allow a man as obviously dangerous as Nash to be released and to escape further restraint simply because we lack adequate controls."

On August 21, 1959, 35-year-old Stephen Nash was put to death in the gas chamber at the San Quentin State Prison. Reports showed that Nash did not receive a single visitor on the last day before his execution, and that no one came to reclaim his body for funeral perparations. For his last meal, Nash ordered ham sandwiches, hamburgers, pie and steak, and a gallon of milk. He also refused to receive spiritual comfort during the final hours before his execution.

Nash's final words in the execution chamber were, "Unfortunately, I’ve never been able to live like a man. However, I expect to die like a man." Over the following nine minutes, as cyanide pellets were released into sulfuric acid to produce the gas, he was heard remarking, "It's slow. Real slow," before he died. The father of one of Nash's victims, Larry Rice, was among the witnesses of Nash's execution, and he stated that justice had been served. Los Angeles County deputy district attorney J. Miller Leavy was also present as a witness.

In the aftermath, Nash came to be remembered as one of California's more infamous mass and serial killers, often cited among those whose crimes were driven by a perceived sense of grievance against society and resentment over personal mistreatment.

In 2017, Nash was one of the 12 notorious serial killers recorded in the 11th volume of true crime book True Crime: American Monsters Vol.11: 12 Horrific American Serial Killers, which was written by Robert Keller.

== See also ==
- Capital punishment in California
- List of people executed in California
- List of serial killers in the United States
- List of people executed in the United States in 1959
