= Bishop, Maryland =

Unincorporated community in Maryland, United States

- Unincorporated community
- Location within Maryland
- Coordinates: 38°25′39″N 75°13′16″W
- Country: United States
- State: Maryland
- County: Worcester
- Elevation: 43 ft (13 m)
- Time zone: UTC-5 (Eastern (EST))
  - Summer (DST): UTC-4 (EDT)
- ZIP code: 21813
- Area codes: 410, 443, and 667
- GNIS feature ID: 583251

Bishop is an unincorporated community in Worcester County, Maryland, United States. Bishop is located at the intersection of U.S. Route 113 and Maryland Route 367, just south of the Delaware state line.
