= St. Martin's Episcopal Church (Showell, Maryland) =

Historic church in Maryland, US

- St. Martin's Church
- U.S. National Register of Historic Places
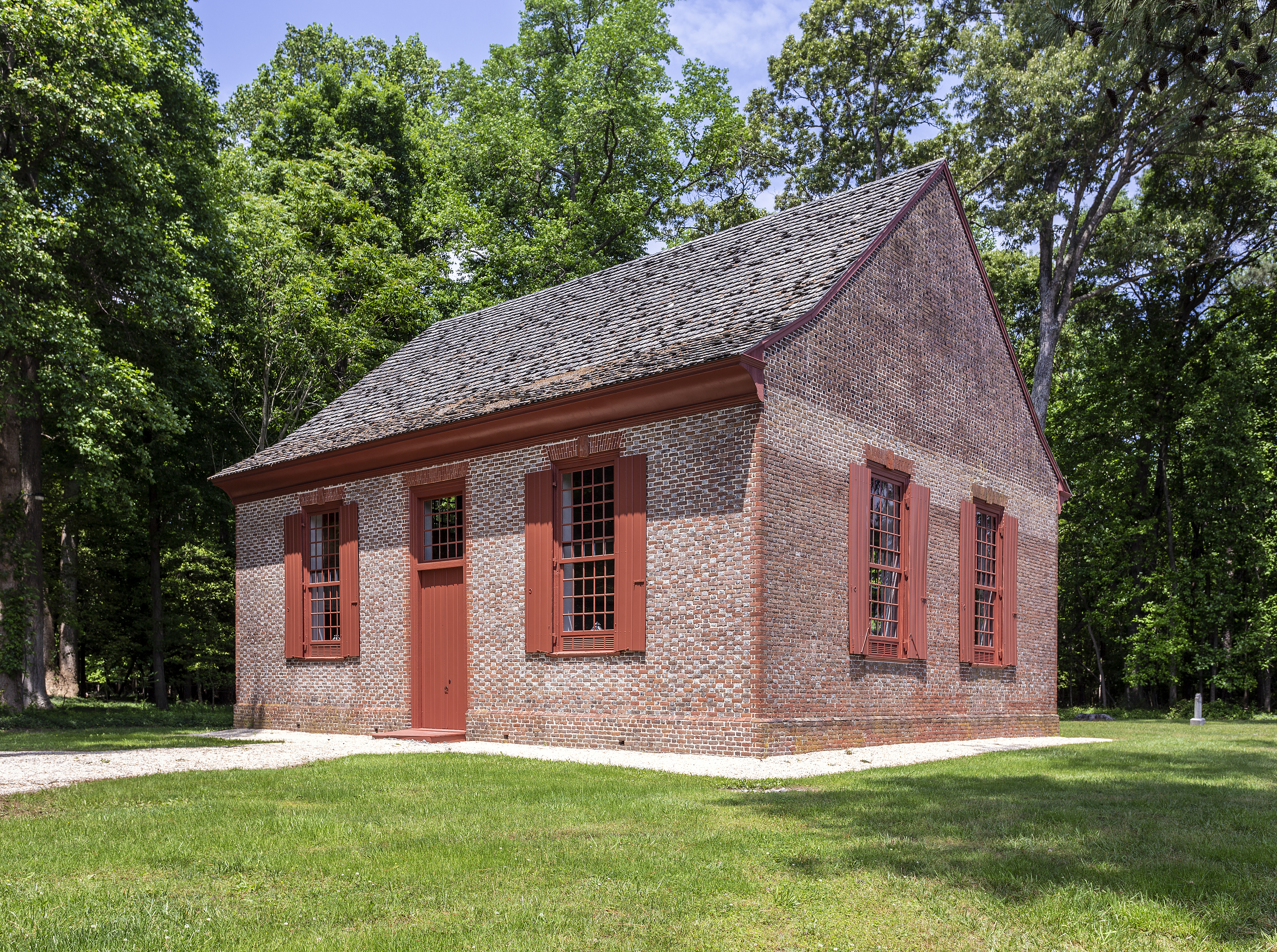
- St. Martin's Episcopal Church in 2018

- Location within Maryland Location within the United States
- Location: Worcester Highway (US 113), Showell, Maryland
- Coordinates: 38°23′34″N 75°12′18″W
- Area: 1 acre (0.40 ha)
- Built: 1756
- NRHP reference No.: 77000707
- Added to NRHP: April 13, 1977

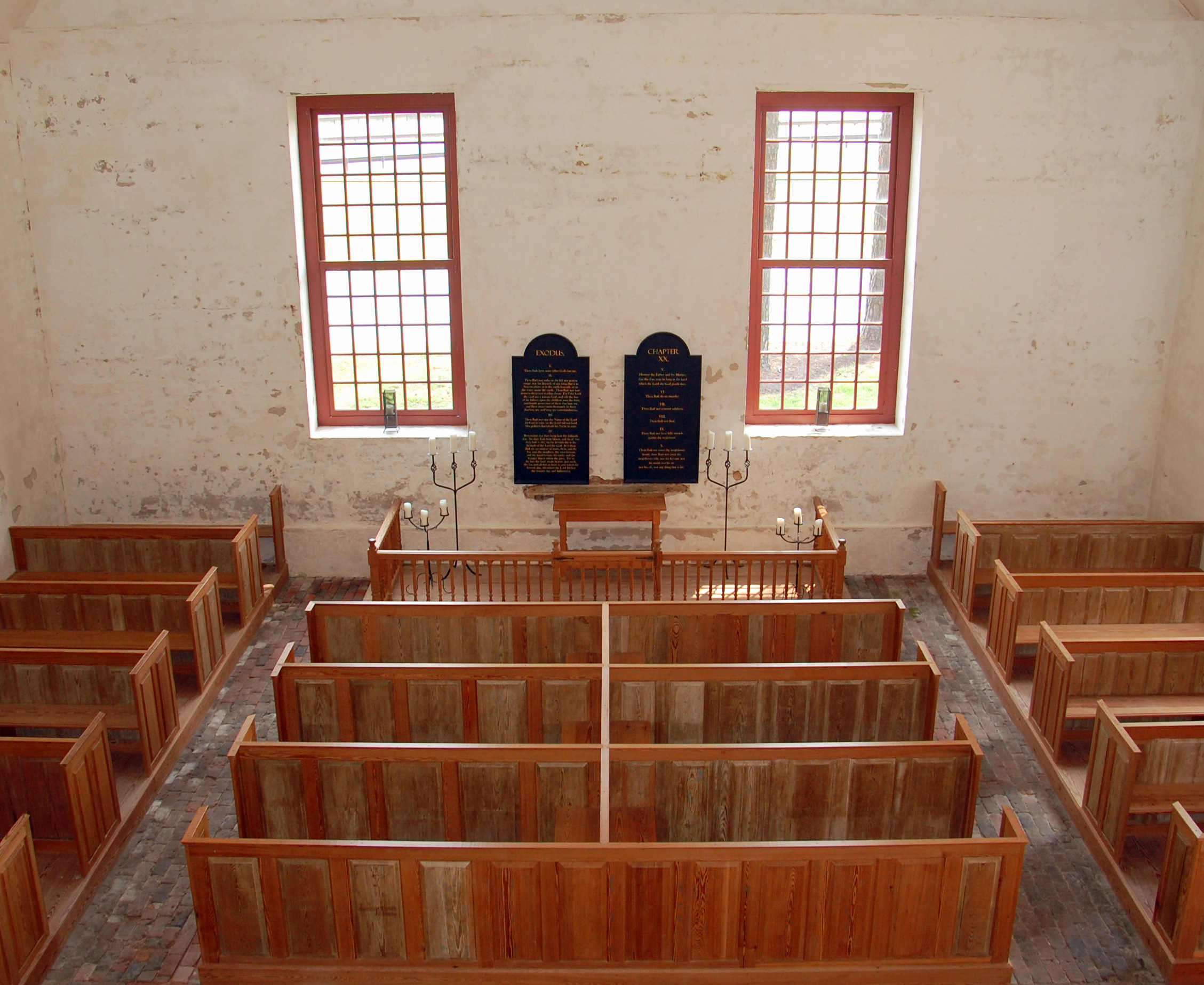
Church interior

St. Martin's Episcopal Church is a historic Episcopal church located on Route 113 at the intersection with Route 589 in Showell, Worcester County, Maryland. Much of the original Flemish bond brick structure is retained. Built as the first parish church of Worcester Parish, which had been established in 1753, it was started in 1756 and completed in 1759. Attendance dwindled after St. Paul's Episcopal Church was established in nearby Berlin in 1824, and by the end of the century the facility was used only sporadically.

By the 1970s the facility was in serious disrepair. The St. Martins's Church Foundation was established in 1993 to organize its restoration, and now operates the building as St. Martin's Episcopal Church Museum. The museum accurately preserves the original interior.

It was listed on the National Register of Historic Places in 1977.

== Architecture ==
St. Martin's Church is a rectangular-plan Georgian styled church constructed of brick laid in Flemish bond with glazed headers. The church is oriented with the main entrance to the south, a secondary entrance to the west, and the communion table to the east. The south facade is three bays wide, with the central bay occupied by the doorway and a large transom which extends to the height of the neighboring windows. The east and north sides of the church each have two bays. The west facade features a central doorway surmounted by a window which opens into the gallery. All window and door openings, with the exception of the west door and window, are topped with jack arches with raised keystones executed in rubbed bricks.

The interior of the church is laid out in two aisles running east and west, with a gallery extending across the west end, accessed by a staircase in the southwest corner of the building. Centered on the north wall of the church is the pulpit, which is crowned with a simple sounding board. The communion table, positioned on a raised platform, is centered on the east wall of the church. Original brick pavers still cover the aisles. The entire nave is covered by a barrel vaulted ceiling.

== See also ==
- List of post 1692 Anglican parishes in the Province of Maryland
