= Worcester Technical High School (Maryland) =

Coordinates: 38.2200°N 75.3416°W

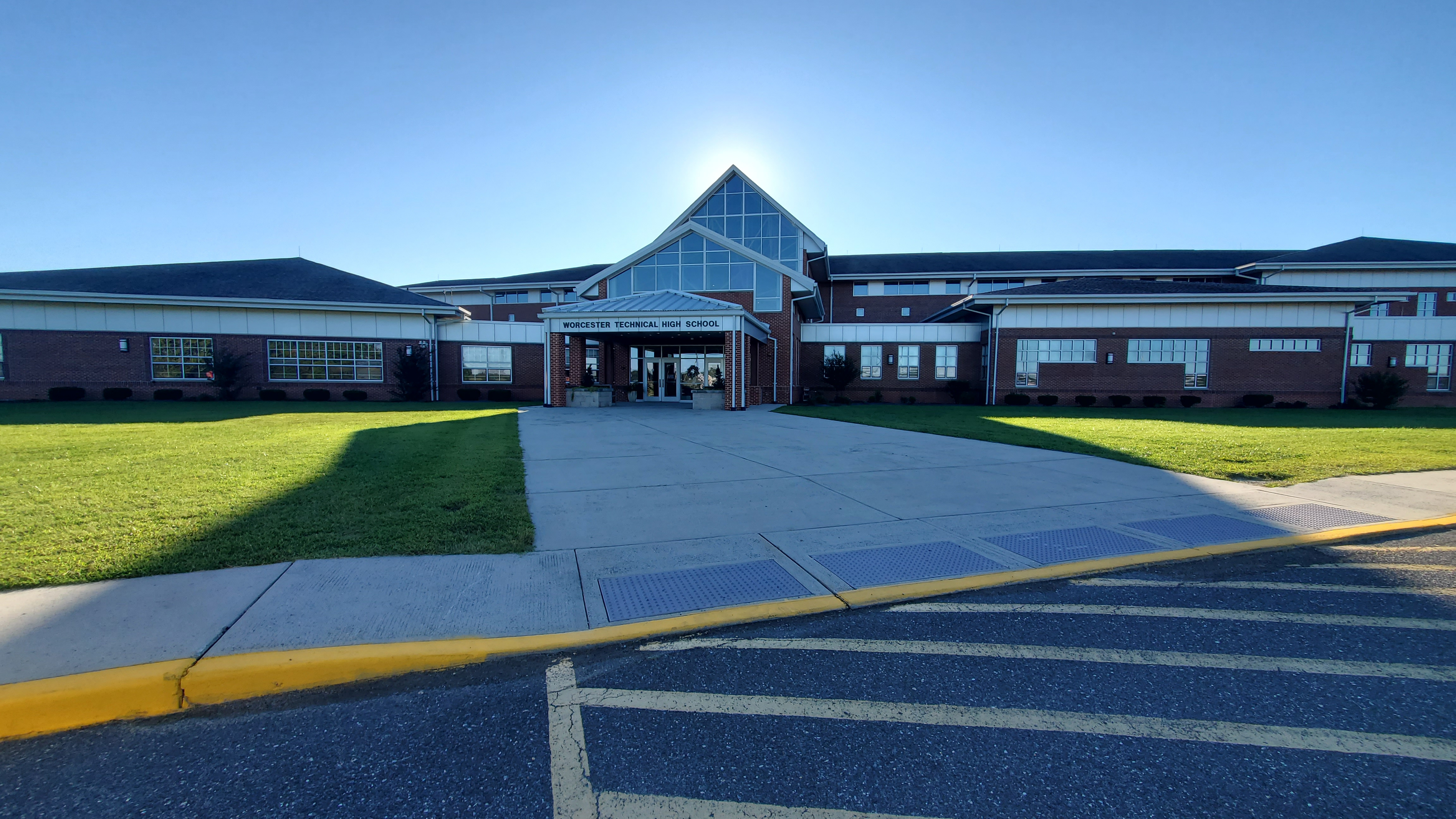

Location
- 6290 Worcester Highway; Newark, Maryland; United States

Information
- Type: Public High School (9-12)
- Motto: "Teaching the Whole Student."
- Established: 1953
- School district: Worcester Public Schools
- Principal: Tony Bevilacqua
- Enrollment: 600
- Campus: 165 acres (67 ha)
- Mascot: Marlin
- Website: WTHS website

Worcester Technical High School (WTHS) (known through 2008 as Worcester Career and Technology Center) is a four-year public high school in Newark, Worcester County, Maryland, United States. It is one of four public high schools in Worcester County along with Pocomoke High School, Snow Hill High School, and Stephen Decatur High School.

== About the School ==
The school is located on the Eastern Shore of Maryland near the village of Newark in Worcester County. The school is south of Berlin, Maryland and north of Snow Hill, Maryland on U.S. 113

The school focuses on preparing the students for entering the work force upon graduation with the needed skills to be successful, though some students do continue on to secondary education.

The school has received several awards and recognition including being accredited by the Middle States Association of Colleges and Universities, and Active Skills USA - VICA Chapter, local, regional, state and national recognition. Twenty two students and/or student teams at Worcester Technical High School were awarded medals at the Skills USA state competition in March 2011. These students will be competing at the Skills USA Nationals competition in July 2011.

The original school building was constructed in 1953, with an addition completed in 1986. That building became increasingly inadequate and a new school was built adjacent to the original structure. It opened in the fall of 2008 and is 139,077 square feet (12,920.7 m^{2}) in size. The school currently has 165 acres (67 ha) of land. This school is currently ran by the Worcester County Public School District is supports student from Snow Hill High School, Pocomoke High School, Stephen Decatur High School, and more.

== Students ==
Worcester Technical High School currently has about 600 students enrolled.

== Awards ==
The Worcester Beach Bots FIRST Robotics Competition Team #4288, based out of Worcester Technical High School, became the first FRC team on the Eastern Shore to win a FIRST Robotics Competition, winning the 2014 North Carolina Regional championship on March 15, 2014.

== See also ==
- List of high schools in Maryland
- Worcester County Public Schools
- Worcester Technical High School (Massachusetts)

== Programs ==
Worcester Technical High School has many different types of programs ranging from nursing, welding, carpentry, and so many more.
