= Maryland Route 367 =

State highway in Maryland, United States

Maryland Route 367
- Bishopville Road
- Maryland Route 367 highlighted in red

Route information
- Maintained by MDSHA
- Length: 2.60 mi (4.18 km)
- Existed: 1927–present

Major junctions
- West end: Bishopville Road at Bishop
- US 113 at Bishop; MD 368 in Bishopville; MD 568 in Bishopville
- East end: Hudson Road at the Delaware state line near Bishopville

Location
- Country: United States
- State: Maryland
- Counties: Worcester

Highway system
- Maryland highway system; Interstate; US; State; Scenic Byways
← MD 366	→ MD 368

Maryland Route 367 (MD 367) is a state highway in the U.S. state of Maryland. Known as Bishopville Road, the state highway runs 2.60 miles (4.18 km) from the county-maintained portion of Bishopville Road at Bishop east to the Delaware state line near Bishopville. MD 367 connects U.S. Route 113 (US 113) with Bishopville and other small communities on the St. Martin Neck in northern Worcester County. The state highway was constructed between Bishop and Bishopville in two steps in the mid-1920s and early 1930s, respectively. The segment within Bishopville was constructed as part of an extended MD 368 in the mid-1910s. The portion from Bishopville to the Delaware state line was constructed in the mid-1930s as MD 568. All three state highways were reassigned to their present lengths in 1950.

== Route description ==
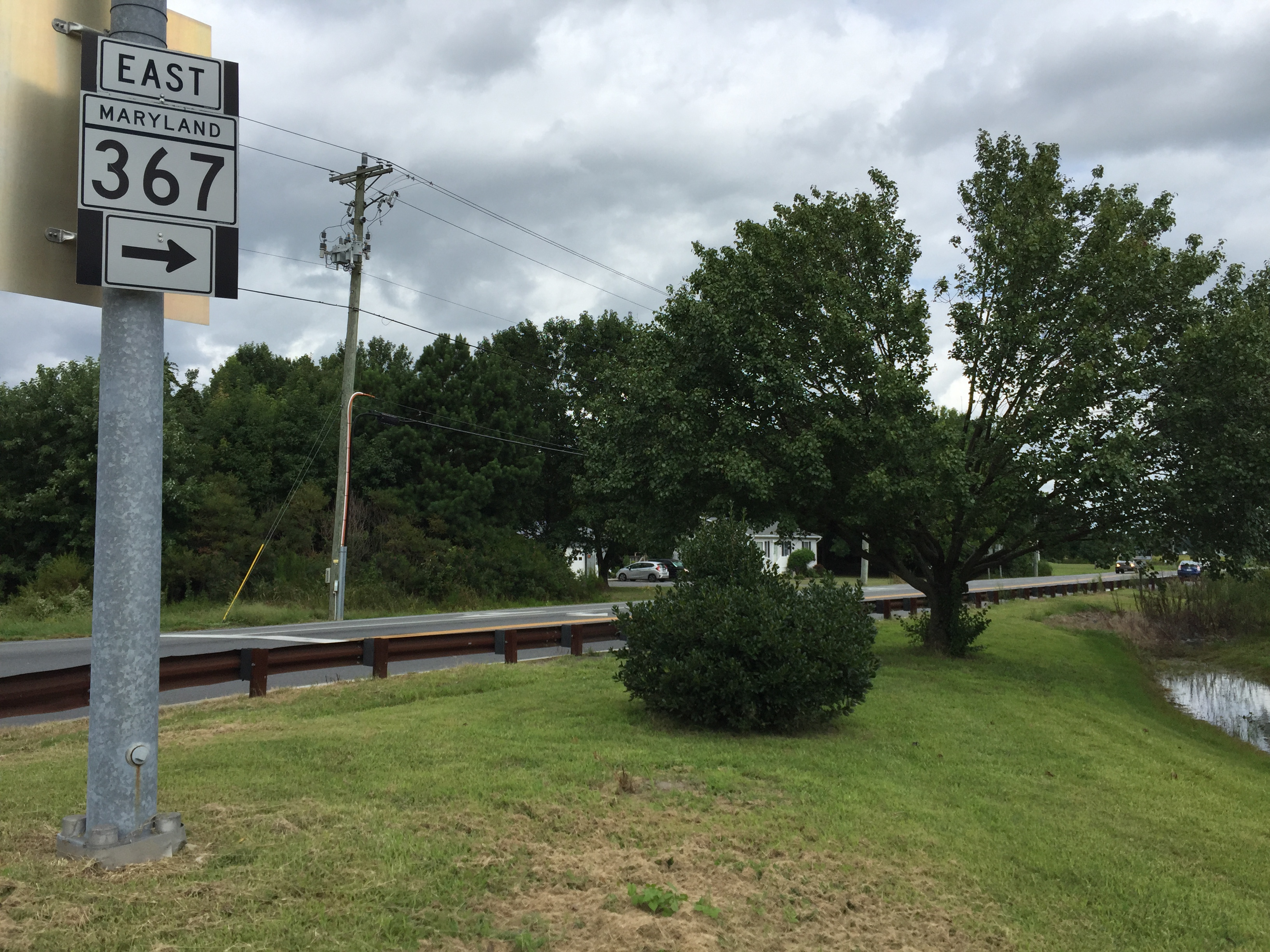
View east along MD 367 at US 113 in Bishop

MD 367 begins on the east side of the Snow Hill Line of the Maryland and Delaware Railroad in the hamlet of Bishop. Bishopville Road continues west of the railroad track as a county highway. MD 367 intersects US 113 (Worcester Highway), then continues east as a two-lane undivided road toward Bishopville. After crossing Buntings Branch of the St. Martin River, the state highway enters Bishopville and intersects MD 368 (St. Martins Neck Road) and MD 568 (Hatchery Road). MD 367 reaches its eastern terminus at the Delaware state line, where the highway continues northeast as Hudson Road in Sussex County, which leads to an intersection with Delaware Route 54 (DE 54).

== History ==
The first part of MD 367 to be paved was between present day MD 368 and MD 568 in Bishopville. That segment, plus the present lengths of MD 368 and MD 568, were paved as a state-aid road between 1912 and 1915 and later designated MD 368. The next segment of modern MD 367 was between the western terminus and just west of Buntings Branch, which was completed by 1923. The connection over Buntings Branch to MD 368 was finished by 1933. The remainder of Bishopville Road to the Delaware state line was completed in 1934 and designated MD 568. MD 367 was extended east from MD 368 to the Delaware state line in 1950 when MD 368 was rolled back to its present length and MD 568 was reassigned to Hatchery Road.

== Junction list ==
The entire route is in Worcester County.

Location	mi	km	Destinations	Notes
Bishop	0.00	0.00	Bishopville Road west	Western terminus
Bishop	0.09	0.14	US 113 (Worcester Highway) – Berlin, Selbyville, DE	
Bishopville	1.84	2.96	MD 368 south (St. Martins Neck Road) – Ocean City	Northern terminus of MD 368
Bishopville	2.13	3.43	MD 568 north (Hatchery Road) – Selbyville, DE	Southern terminus of MD 568
Bishopville	2.60	4.18	Hudson Road north to DE 54 – Fenwick Island	Delaware state line; eastern terminus
1.000 mi = 1.609 km; 1.000 km = 0.621 mi
