= Snow Hill High School =

Coordinates: 38.1699°N 75.3905°W

Location
- 305 South Church St. Snow Hill, Maryland 21863; United States

Information
- Type: Public high school
- Opened: 1957
- School district: Worcester Public Schools
- NCES School ID: 240072001334
- Principal: Meyer Evans
- Teaching staff: 32
- Grades: 9–12
- Enrollment: 337 (2020-2021)
- Student to teacher ratio: 10.53 (FTE)
- Hours in school day: 8am–3pm
- Campus: Rural
- Colors: Maroon and silver
- Athletics conference: Bayside South
- Sports: Football, golf, soccer, tennis, volleyball, wrestling, basketball, baseball, softball, indoor track, cross-country track, cheerleading
- Mascot: The Eagle
- Newspaper: The Eagle
- Website: shhs.worcesterk12.org

Snow Hill High School (SHHS) is a four-year public high school in Snow Hill, Maryland, United States. It is one of four public high schools in Worcester County along with Pocomoke High School, Stephen Decatur High School, and the Worcester Technical High School.

== Overview ==
The school is located on the Eastern Shore of Maryland in the town of Snow Hill, MD. The school is on Maryland Route 12 and between U.S. Route 113 and U.S. Route 113 Business. The current building was built in 1957 with an addition being completed in 1982 and has 70,657 square feet (6,564.3 m^{2}) of space located on 18 acres (7.3 ha) of land. Beginning in 2014, and finishing in 2017, the building received a $44.8 million renovation.

== Students ==
Snow Hill High School's graduation rate has been very high in past years. In 2007 the school graduated 95.58%, though in 2004 it graduated 100% of seniors.

Student population

Year	Pop.	±%
2003	411	—
2004	400	−2.7%
2005	435	+8.7%
2006	438	+0.7%
2007	431	−1.6%
2008	403	−6.5%
2009	368	−8.7%

Year	Pop.	±%
2010	355	−3.5%
2011	347	−2.3%
2012	340	−2.0%
2013	325	−4.4%
2014	323	−0.6%
2015	315	−2.5%
2016	328	+4.1%

Year	Pop.	±%
2017	312	−4.9%
2018	321	+2.9%
2019	322	+0.3%
2020	315	−2.2%
2021	337	+7.0%
2022	343	+1.8%
2023	348	+1.5%

== Staff ==
The following people have been the principal at Snow Hill High School:

John I. Coulbourn	1903-1904
Virgil F. Ward	1904-1907
Arthur C. Humphreys	1907-1921
Oliver Perry Simmons	1921-1946
Wilbur A. Jones	-1954
Ernest G. Holland	1954-1960
Robert H. Layman	1960-1963
Harold G. Phillips	1963-1968
George C. Dimmick	1968-
Kelly H. Shumate	1971-1996
Mark Record	1996-2006
Tom Davis	2006-2014
Kimberly Purvis	2014-2023
Leland Green	2023–Present

== Band ==
The Snow Hill High School Marching Eagles maintain a reputation of pride and excellence. During the past 26 years, the band has performed in 126 competitive events against bands from eighteen different states and the District of Columbia. In this time, the band has received 121 first place awards, four second place awards, and one third place award. The band has placed first in 83 of the last 84 competitions.

The Snow Hill High School Concert Band is also regarded as one of the premier high school band programs on Maryland's Eastern Shore, annually receiving "Superior" ratings at regional band adjudications.

The Snow Hill High School Band, both Marching Eagles and Concert Band, are led by the big Brad Kraus. The band also has a currency in the making. called "Brad Bucks," a homage to the leader.

== Sports ==
State Champions

- 2008 - Boys' Basketball 1A Champs
- 2006 - Boys' Baseball
- 2001 - Boys' Basketball
- 1989 - Boys' Basketball
- 1982 - Football
- 1980 - Football
- 1979 - Girls' Basketball

== See also ==
- List of high schools in Maryland
- Worcester County Public Schools
