= Pocomoke High School =

Coordinates: 38.06223°N 75.55152°W

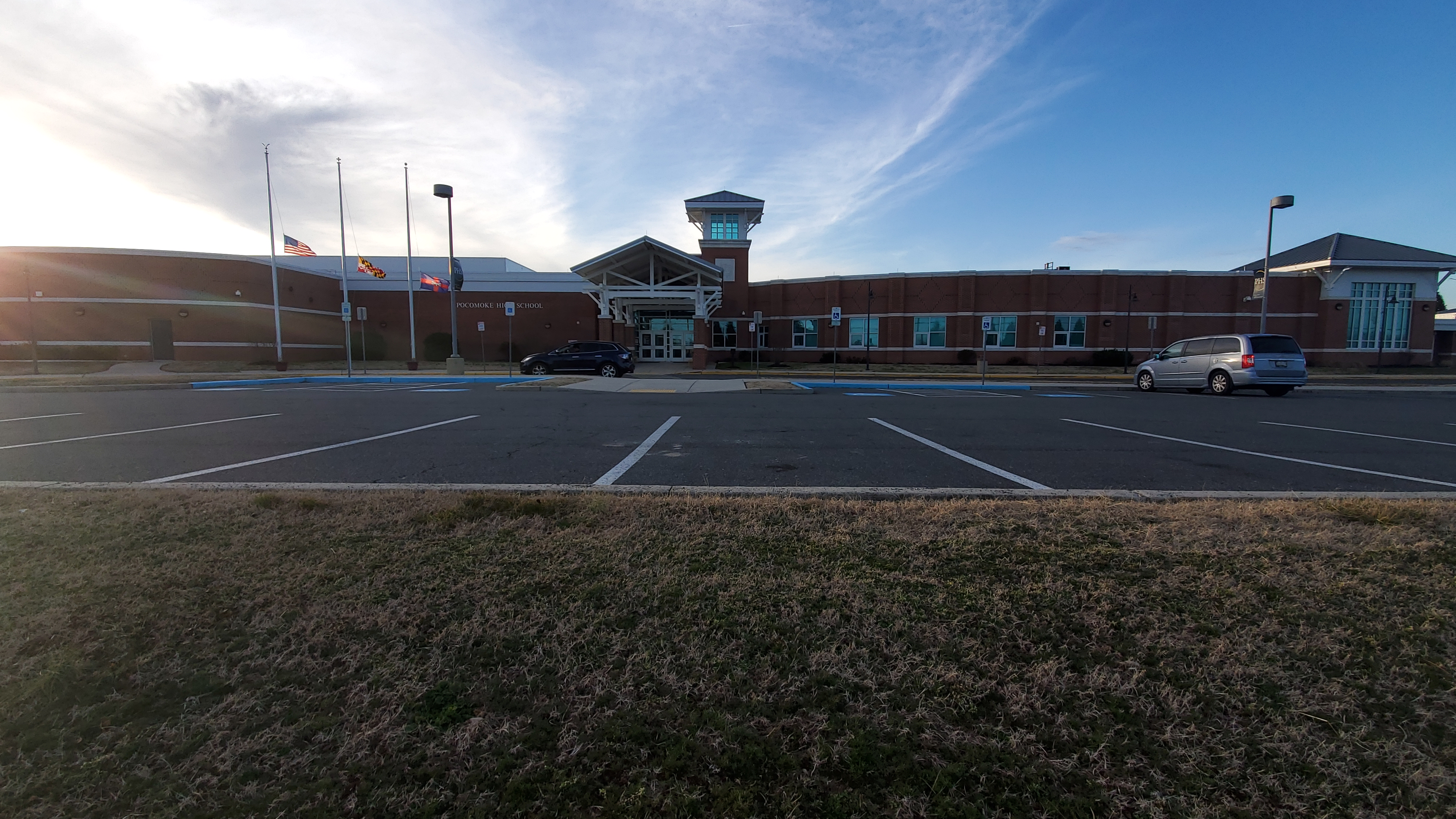
- Pocomoke High School near sundown

Location
- 1817 Old Virginia Rd; Pocomoke City, Maryland 21851; United States

Information
- Type: Public high school
- Opened: 1957
- School district: Worcester Public Schools
- NCES School ID: 240072001330
- Principal: Jennifer Rayne
- Teaching staff: 32.50 (on an FTE basis)
- Grades: 9–12
- Enrollment: 352 (2023)
- Student to teacher ratio: 10.74
- Hours in school day: 8am–3pm
- Campus: Rural
- Colors: Blue and Gold
- Athletics conference: Bayside South
- Sports: Maryland Public Secondary Schools Athletic Association
- Accreditation: Blue Ribbon
- Newspaper: PHS "Involver"
- Website: phs.worcesterk12.org

Pocomoke High School (commonly Pocomoke, Pocomoke High, PHS) is a four-year public high school in Pocomoke City, Worcester County, Maryland, United States. With the grades of 9–12 the school is a part of Worcester County Public Schools. It is one of four public high schools in Worcester County along with Stephen Decatur High School, Worcester Technical High School, and Snow Hill High School. Pocomoke is a Maryland State Blue Ribbon School.

== Overview ==
The school is located on the Eastern Shore of Maryland in the town of Pocomoke City in Worcester County. The school is on Old Virginia Road, which is west of the intersections of US 13 Business, US 13, US 113, and Maryland Route 366.

The school building was renovated in 2010 which added new additions and has 122,500 square feet (11,380 m^{2}) of space located on 22.02 acres (8.91 ha) of land.

In 2016, former Principal, Dr. Annette Wallace was named the 2015-2016 Maryland State Principal of the Year by the National Association of Secondary School Principals and for providing exceptional leadership while building and sustaining a school climate of academic excellence where student achievement abounds.

In January 2023, Principal, Jennifer Rayne was awarded the Human and Civil Rights Award at the Maryland State Education Association's Martin Luther King, Jr. Celebration and Racial Social Justice Summit in Baltimore, MD for her efforts with Speak Up, a club dedicated to elevating student voice. The club explores the rich, diverse history and culture of all marginalized populations including women, immigrants, refugees, people of color, and members of the LGBTQIA community.

== Students ==
Pocomoke's graduation rate has been somewhat sporadic from 1996 to 2008. In 2007 the school graduated 94.5%, up from 74.8% in 1998.

Student population

Year	Pop.	±%
1993	397	—
1994	398	+0.3%
1995	406	+2.0%
1996	383	−5.7%
1997	366	−4.4%
1998	392	+7.1%
1999	408	+4.1%
2000	448	+9.8%
2001	426	−4.9%
2002	424	−0.5%
2003	420	−0.9%

Year	Pop.	±%
2004	438	+4.3%
2005	476	+8.7%
2006	478	+0.4%
2007	471	−1.5%
2008	452	−4.0%
2009	420	−7.1%
2010	390	−7.1%
2011	333	−14.6%
2012	323	−3.0%
2013	331	+2.5%
2014	357	+7.9%

Year	Pop.	±%
2015	357	+0.0%
2016	333	−6.7%
2017	337	+1.2%
2018	342	+1.5%
2019	333	−2.6%
2020	353	+6.0%
2021	349	−1.1%
2022	333	−4.6%
2023	352	+5.7%

== Sports ==
Pocomoke High School has a very competitive sports history, and a deep root in winning championships, sometimes referred to as "Tradition" in the small hometown. PHS has amassed 34 State Championships since 1971, most of which came from the Girls' Field Hockey Team (20).
Two sports have been crowned State Champions in 1995, 2001, 2003, 2005, 2006, and 2007.
In three school years, three State Championship teams were crowned: 2001-2002 Girls' Field Hockey, Boys' Soccer, and Boys' Basketball. 2007-2008 Girls' Field Hockey, Boys' Soccer, and Girls' Basketball. 2008-2009: Girls' Field Hockey, Boys' Soccer, and Girls' Softball, respectively.
Totals Per Sport:

Sport	Champions	Finalists	Semi-Finalists
Girls' Field Hockey	21	4	2
Boys' Soccer	8	5	4
Boys' Basketball	4	7	8
Girls' Basketball	1	2	10
Girls' Softball	1	0	4
Boys' Baseball	0	1	1
Girls' Volleyball	0	1	0
Football	0	1	0
Total	35	25	25

State Champions:

Sport	Year
Boys' Basketball	1971
Boys' Basketball	1976
Field Hockey	1983
Field Hockey	1987
Boys' Soccer	1988
Field Hockey	1989
Field Hockey	1992
Field Hockey	1994
Field Hockey	1995
Boys' Soccer	1995
Field Hockey	1996
Field Hockey	1997
Field Hockey	1998
Field Hockey	2001
Boys' Soccer	2001
Boys' Basketball	2002
Field Hockey	2003
Boys' Soccer	2003
Field Hockey	2004
Field Hockey	2005
Boys' Soccer	2005
Field Hockey	2006
Boys' Soccer	2006
Field Hockey	2007
Boys' Soccer	2007
Girls' Basketball	2008
Field Hockey	2008
Boys' Soccer	2008
Softball	2009
Field Hockey	2009
Field Hockey	2010
Field Hockey	2015
Boys' Basketball	2016
Field Hockey	2021

State Finalist

Sport	Year
Boys' Soccer	1971
Boys' Soccer	1972
Boys' Basketball	1972
Boys' Basketball	1974
Football	1975
Baseball	1976
Volleyball	1976
Boys' Soccer	1985
Field Hockey	1988
Field Hockey	1990
Boys' Basketball	1991
Field Hockey	1991
Field Hockey	1993
Boys' Basketball	1998
Girls' Basketball	2003
Boys' Basketball	2003
Boys' Soccer	2004
Boys' Basketball	2005
Boys' Basketball	2005
Girls' Basketball	2007
Boys' Basketball	2009
Boys' Soccer	2009

State Semi-Finalist

Sport	Year
Boys' Basketball	1954
Boys' Basketball	1965
Boys' Basketball	1967
Boys' Soccer	1969
Boys' Soccer	1970
Girls' Basketball	1976
Baseball	1977
Field Hockey	1981
Boys' Basketball	1981
Softball	1983
Boys' Basketball	1986
Girls' Basketball	1987
Softball	1988
Softball	1990
Softball	1992
Boys' Basketball	1992
Girls' Basketball	1995
Boys' Soccer	1996
Girls' Basketball	2000
Field Hockey	2002
Girls' Basketball	2004
Girls' Basketball	2005
Girls' Basketball	2006
Boys' Basketball	2010
Girls' Basketball	2015
Girls' Basketball	2016

== See also ==
- List of high schools in Maryland
- Worcester County Public Schools
