= Worcester Preparatory School =

Private school in Berlin, Maryland, US

Location
- 508 South Main Street; Berlin, Maryland; USA; 38.316213°N 75.221618°W

Information
- Type: Independent and day
- Established: 1970
- Headmaster: Dr. Betsy Hornung
- Faculty: 61.8 FTE
- Enrollment: 463
- Student to teacher ratio: 7.5:1
- Campus: Small town, 45 acres (18 ha)
- Athletics conference: ESIAC
- Mascot: Fighting Mallards
- Newspaper: The Beak Speaks
- Yearbook: The Mallard
- Website: worcesterprep.org

Worcester Preparatory School is an independent coeducational preparatory school in Berlin, Worcester County, Maryland in the United States. The school is divided into a preschool and kindergarten, serving approximately 50 students, a lower school, serving approximately 240 students in grades one to six, and a middle/upper school, serving approximately 320 students in grades seven to twelve.

WPS is a member of the National Association of Independent Schools and the Middle States Association of Colleges and Schools, and is both a charter member of, and the first independent school in Maryland to be accredited by, the Middle States Commission on Elementary Schools.

== History ==
Founded in 1970 as the Worcester Country School, its name was later changed to Worcester Preparatory School. The school has always been coeducational.

== Campus ==
Worcester Preparatory School's 45-acre (18 ha) campus is located on the southern edge of the town of Berlin, and comprises the Nichols Early Learning Center, Burbage Center for Admissions and Development, the Academic and Technology Building, the Guerrieri Library (whose design was inspired by Thomas Jefferson's Monticello), the Athletic and Performing Arts Center, and Thompson Field House. The campus also includes tennis courts and five athletic fields.

== Athletics ==
Sports and other activities include basketball, cross country, swim, soccer, tennis, pickleball, golf, volleyball, cheerleading, and lacrosse.

== Headmasters of Worcester Preparatory School ==
- Franklin H. Lynch
- Barry Tull, Ed.D.
- Randal Brown
- John McDonald, Ed.D
- Betsy Hornung, Ed.D

== Bibliography ==
- Bunting, Tia W. (2009). Development and evaluation of a technology integrated social skills curriculum (PhD thesis). University of Delaware.
- "School Detail for Worcester Preparatory School". nces.ed.gov. National Center for Education Statistics.
- Polk, Tracy; Johnston, Melissa P.; Evers, Stephanie (May 2015). "Wikipedia Use in Research: Perceptions in Secondary Schools". TechTrends. 59 (3): 92–102. doi:10.1007/s11528-015-0858-6.
- Russo, Bryan (December 10, 2015). "Tradition, Technology Meet At Worcester Prep". News Ocean City Maryland Coast Dispatch Newspaper.
- "Athletics". www.worcesterprep.org.
