= Worcester County District Courthouses =

The District Court of Maryland for Worcester County District Courthouses, in Ocean City and Snow Hill, serve as the courts of first impression for residents in Worcester County, Maryland. All minor traffic and most misdemeanor criminal cases are handled there.

== Ocean City District Courthouse ==
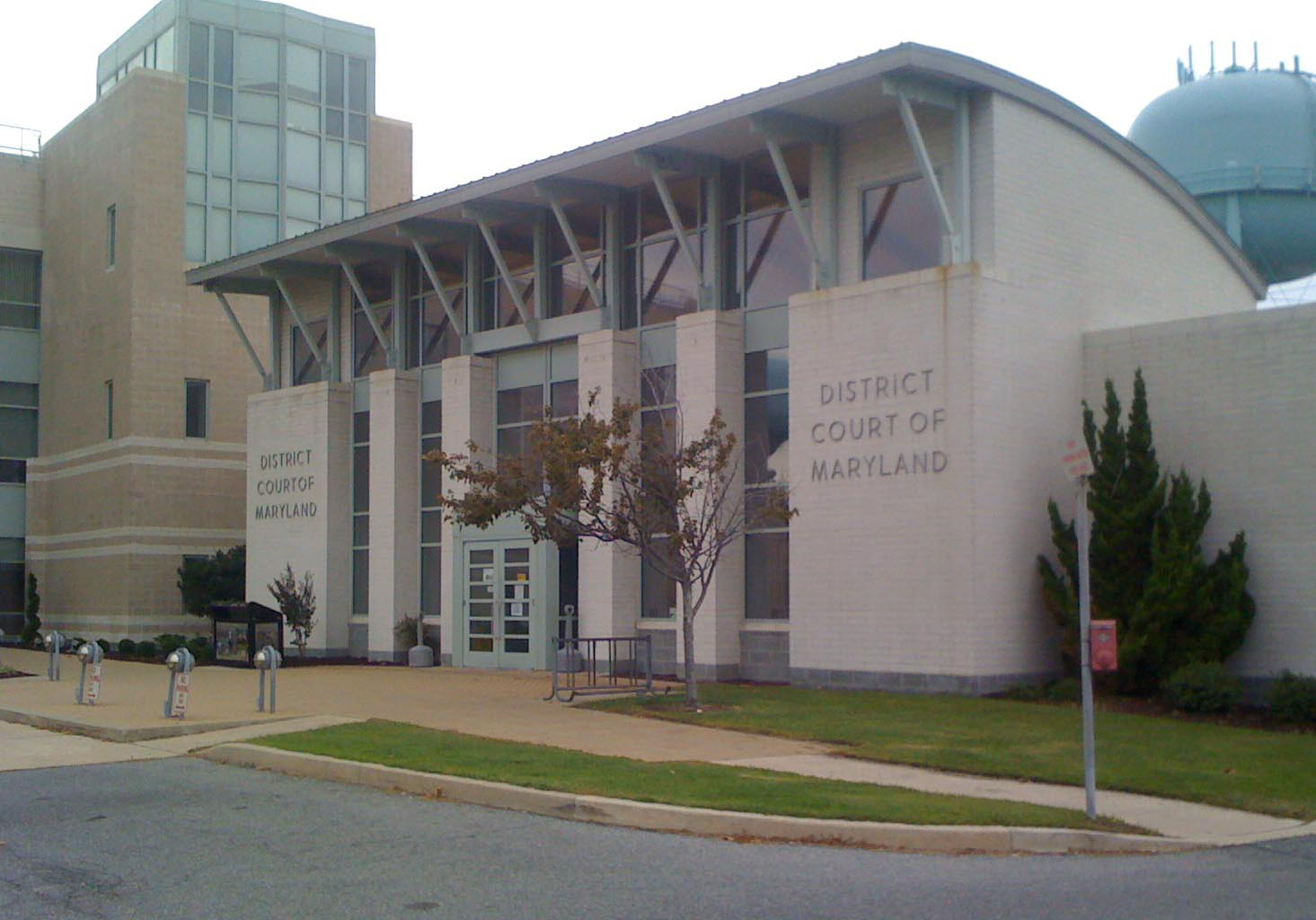
The District Court Building in Ocean City, Maryland 38.388°N 75.067°W

The District Court of Maryland for Worcester County Ocean City Courthouse is located at 6505 Coastal Highway, Ocean City, Maryland, just two blocks from the beach. There is one courtroom, a judge's chambers and offices for the clerks of the District Court of Maryland. The Courthouse is part of the new Ocean City Public Safety Complex which consolidates numerous municipal services in one place. The complex also provides 55,000 square feet (5,100 m^{2}) of space for Police, Emergency Medical Services (EMS), Emergency Operations Center (EOC), and the Department of Juvenile Services.

== Snow Hill District Courthouse ==
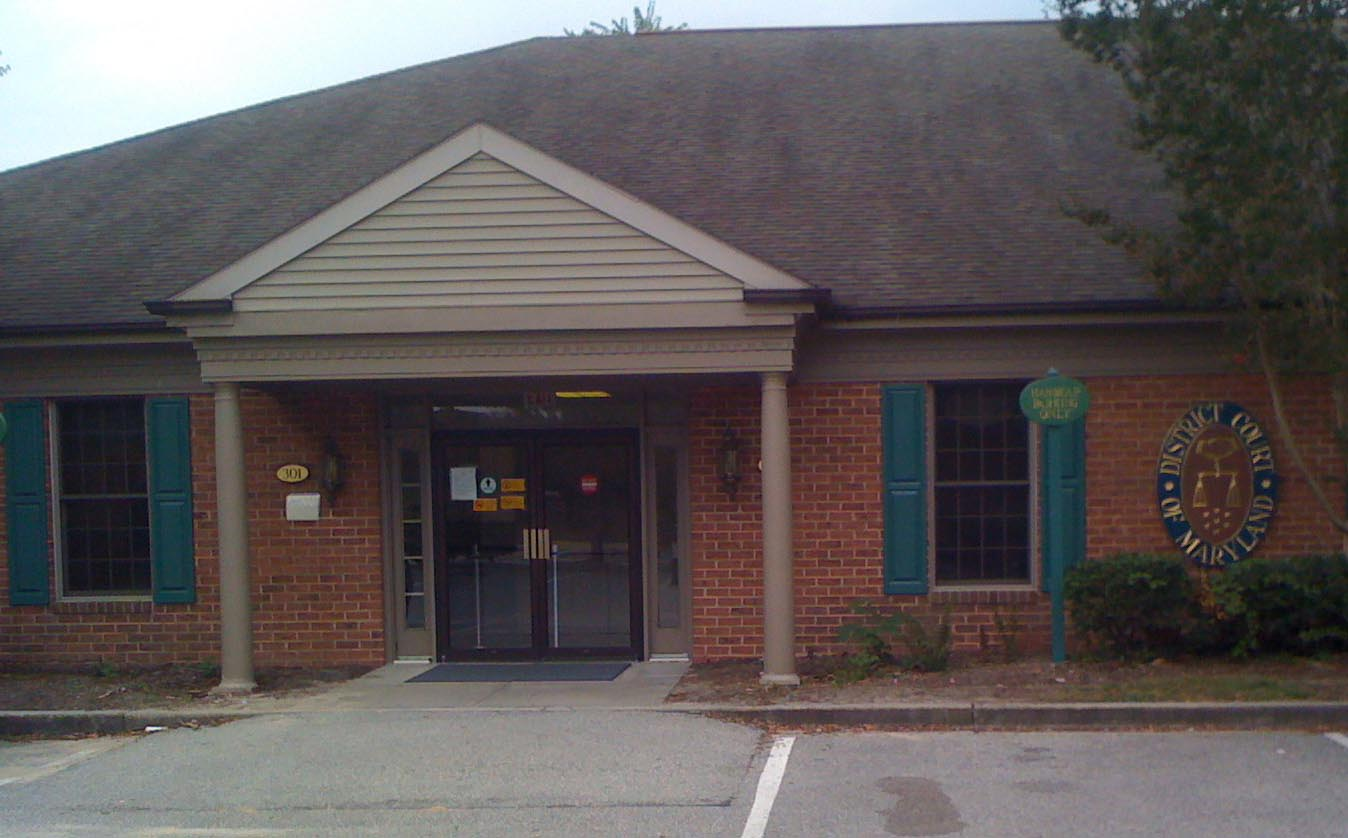
Snow Hill's District Court facility 38.1775°N 75.3955°W

The Snow Hill District Courthouse is located at 301 Commerce Street in Snow Hill, Maryland. There is one courtroom, a judge's chambers, a modest law library, offices of the clerk of the District Court for Worcester County and the office of the court commissioner.
