= Bishopville, Maryland =

- Census-designated place
- Location within Maryland
- Coordinates: 38°26′33″N 75°11′37″W
- Country: United States
- State: Maryland
- County: Worcester

Area
  - Total: 2.89 sq mi (7.49 km^{2})
  - Land: 2.86 sq mi (7.41 km^{2})
  - Water: 0.031 sq mi (0.08 km^{2})
- Elevation: 10 ft (3.0 m)

Population (2020)
  - Total: 499
  - Density: 174.4/sq mi (67.32/km^{2})
- Time zone: UTC−5 (Eastern (EST))
  - Summer (DST): UTC−4 (EDT)
- ZIP code: 21813
- Area codes: 410, 443, and 667
- GNIS feature ID: 583255

Bishopville is an unincorporated community and census-designated place 10 miles (16 km) north of Berlin, Maryland, United States. The community is just south of the Delaware state line. It is part of the Salisbury, Maryland-Delaware Metropolitan Statistical Area. As of the 2010 census, Bishopville had a population of 531.

Bishopville arose at the site of a mill on and crossing of the Bishopville Prong of the St. Martin's River. The crossing, the main road through the community, is now Maryland Route 367.

== Demographics ==
Historical population
Census	Pop.	Note	%±
2020	499		—
U.S. Decennial Census
