= Patuxent people =

Patuxent
Total population
- Extinct as a tribe

Regions with significant populations
- Western Shore of Maryland

Languages
- Eastern Algonquian

Religion
- Native religion

Related ethnic groups
- Piscataway

The Patuxent or Pawtuxent were one of the Native American tribes living along the western shore of the Chesapeake Bay. They spoke an Algonquian language and were loosely dominated by the Piscataway.

The first European to explore the river was Capt. John Smith who sailed 40 miles.

As European settlements grew and tobacco plantations took over, surviving Indians moved on. By 1674, some Pawtuxent Indians lived on 700 acres of land set aside for them by Lord Baltimore at Billingsley Point, now public park land near Upper Marlboro at the confluence of the Patuxent River and Western Branch.
