= Worcester County, Maryland =

County in Maryland, United States

- County
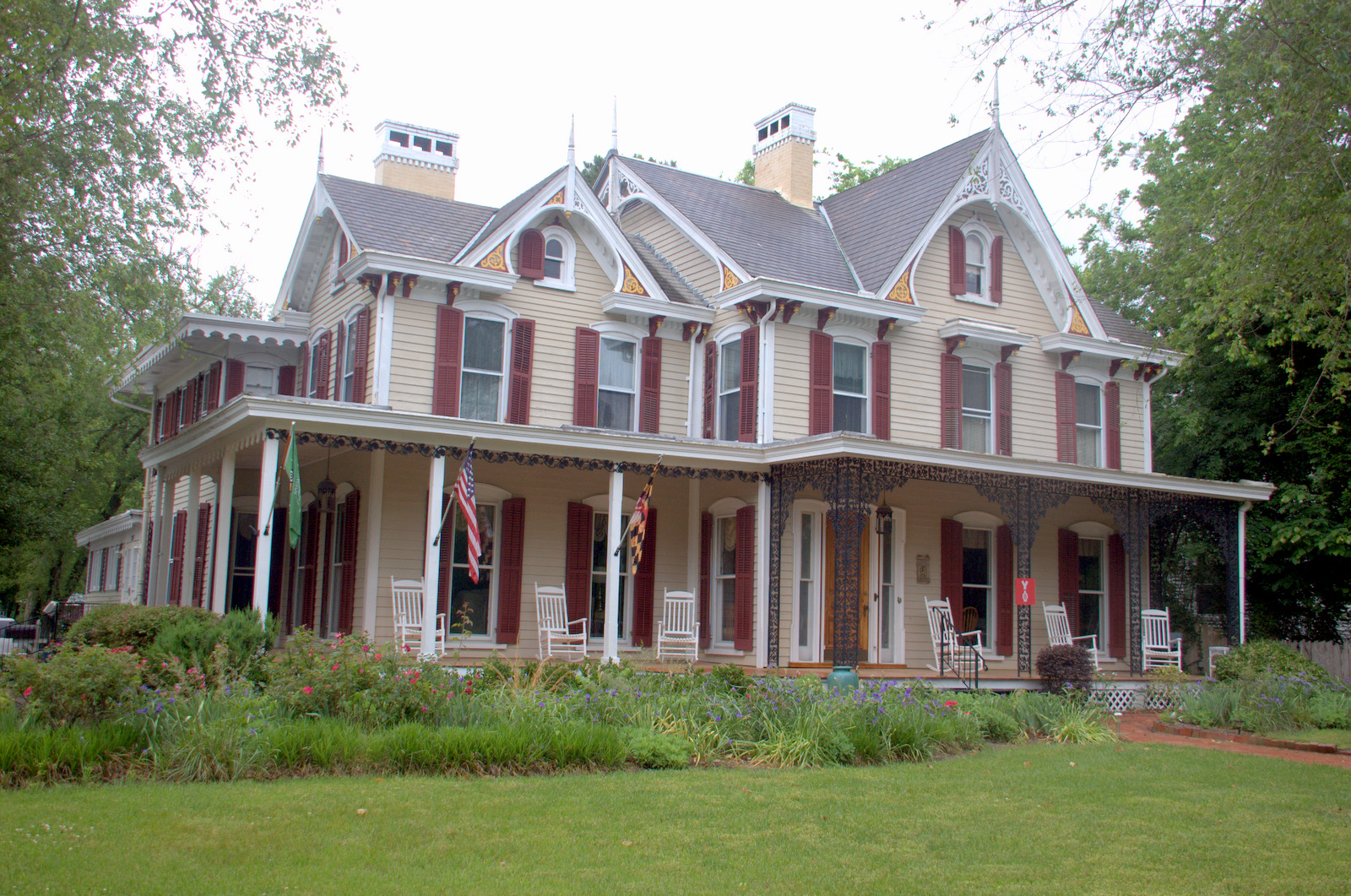
- George Washington Purnell House

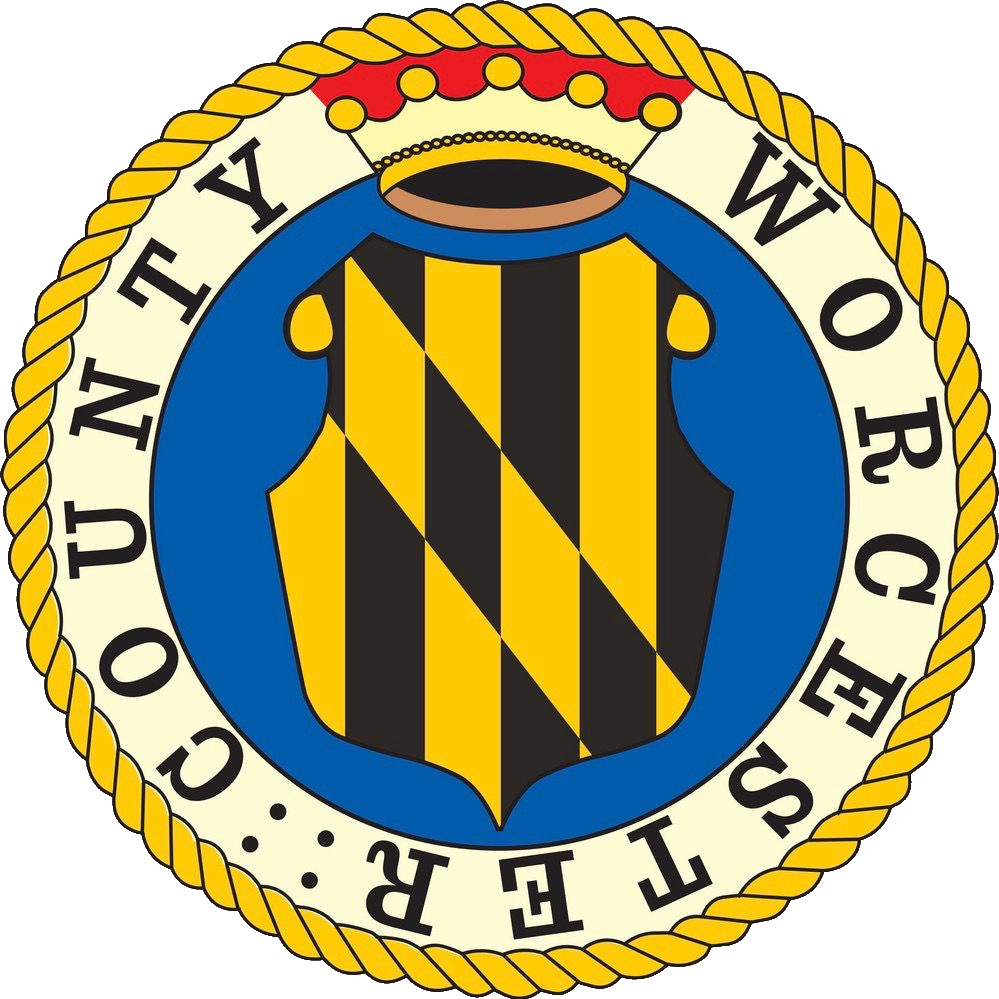
- Flag Seal

- Location within the U.S. state of Maryland
- Coordinates: 38°14′N 75°17′W
- Country: United States
- State: Maryland
- Founded: 1742
- Named for: Family of Marquess of Worcester
- Seat: Snow Hill
- Largest community: Ocean Pines

Area
  - Total: 695 sq mi (1,800 km^{2})
  - Land: 468 sq mi (1,210 km^{2})
  - Water: 227 sq mi (590 km^{2}) 33%

Population (2020)
  - Total: 52,460
  - Estimate (2025): 54,459 ▲
  - Density: 75/sq mi (29/km^{2})
- Time zone: UTC−5 (Eastern)
  - Summer (DST): UTC−4 (EDT)
- Congressional district: 1st
- Website: www.co.worcester.md.us

Worcester County /ˈwʊrstər/ is the easternmost county of the U.S. state of Maryland. As of the 2020 census, the population was 52,460. Its county seat is Snow Hill. The county is part of the Lower Eastern Shore region of the state.

It is the only county of Maryland that borders the Atlantic Ocean, and the only county bordering both Delaware and Virginia. The county was named for Mary Arundell, the wife of Sir John Somerset, a son of Henry Somerset, 1st Marquess of Worcester. She was sister to Anne Arundell (Anne Arundel County), wife of Cecil Calvert, 2nd Baron Baltimore (Cecil County), the first Proprietor and Proprietary Governor of the Province of Maryland.

As part of the Ocean Pines Micropolitan Statistical Area, it also is included in the Salisbury–Ocean Pines Combined Statistical Area. The county includes the entire length of the state's ocean and tidewater coast along the Intracoastal Waterway bordering Assawoman Bay, Isle of Wight Bay, Sinepuxent Bay, and Chincoteague Bay between the sand barrier islands of Fenwick Island and Assateague Island bordering the Atlantic Ocean coast. It is home to the popular vacation resort area of Ocean City, founded 1875, as well as wild habitats on the primitive wilderness areas on Assateague Island and in the Pocomoke River and Swamp.

== History ==
Worcester County was created by the division of the formerly larger Eastern Shore's Somerset County in 1742. The county seat, which was previously located near the confluence of Dividing Creek with the Pocomoke River, was later transferred to the river port of Snow Hill, at the head of navigation of the Pocomoke, now near the center of the new county.

Both the areas of Somerset and Worcester Counties were divided into old colonial divisions of "hundreds", from south to north: Mattapony, Pocomoke, Boquetenorton, Wicomico, and Baltimore Hundreds. Later subdivisions of these hundreds added Pitts Creek, Acquango, Queponco, and Buckingham & Worcester Hundreds, all of which in turn eventually became election districts for the newly independent state following American independence. Competing territorial claims between the Proprietor family of the Calverts and the Lords Baltimore in the old Province of Maryland and the Penns of the neighboring Province of Pennsylvania to the north and of what later became the state of Delaware to the east led to the surveying of Worcester County's northern border, the "Transpeninsular Line" in 1751, though boundary disputes continued through the rest of the colonial period, not totally settled until the work of the famous Charles Mason and Jeremiah Dixon with their "Mason–Dixon line". In 1779, Stephen Decatur, the famous United States Navy officer and hero of the First Barbary War and the Second Barbary War in the early 1800s, and leading into the War of 1812, was born at Sinepuxent, near what is today the town of Berlin.

Originally settled by European immigrants of British and Irish stock, along with slaves of mainly West African descent, Worcester County was divided during the colonial period into several Church of England parishes, though Quakers, Presbyterians, and later Methodists also set up meeting houses. Like the border states in general, Worcester County had a high proportion of free people of color for many decades before the Civil War, due in part to the influence of initially Quakerism, and later Methodism. During the 1840s and 1850s, Worcester County, Maryland had the highest portion of free people of color per capita out of any county in Maryland. It was one of the few counties in the state with an active abolitionist movement. Most abolitionists in the county were Methodists, Quakers and Presbyterians, however the slave-owning community was overwhelmingly Baptist and Catholic. First-generation immigrants from England and Germany were also overwhelmingly abolitionists in Worcester County. During the civil war in Worcester County first generation immigrants from England and Germany were known for siding with the Union whereas first generation Irish Catholic immigrants from Ireland overwhelmingly sided with the Confederacy and were known for being some of the leaders of the Copperheads or "Peace Democrats" in Worcester County.

Worcester County was primarily an agricultural area from its inception, first planting tobacco, but when the quality produced in the area's sandy soil could not compete with that produced elsewhere, they began growing wheat, corn, and livestock. Early industrial activity included the smelting of bog iron ore in a brick blast furnace to make pig iron at Furnacetown in the first half of the 19th century. The presence of large bald cypress swamps along the Pocomoke River led to logging, the manufacture of roofing shingles, and shipbuilding along the river at Newtown (later Pocomoke City). The arrival of steam-powered water transport and then the railroad opened urban markets to another of Worcester County's principal products: seafood, particularly shellfish. Oysters, clams, and crabs were shipped to Baltimore, Philadelphia, and New York. Soon after the Civil War (to each side of which Worcester County sent soldiers), parts of both Worcester and Somerset Counties were combined to create, in 1867, Wicomico County. Also in the later 19th century, the seaside resort of Ocean City was founded.

Truck farming and the canning industry came to the fore during the early 20th century. However, both the seafood industry and truck farming declined after mid-century, due to overfishing on the one hand, and the opening of California's Central Valley to irrigated agriculture on the other, but the advent of the large-scale poultry industry filled this gap. The expansion of Ocean City since the 1960s has turned the northern part of the county from a summer resort to an expanding year-round community.

Two major storms influenced the course of Worcester County history in the 20th Century: the hurricane of August 1933, which badly damaged Ocean City and Public Landing, but also cut the Ocean City Inlet and passageway between the inner bays west of the sandy barrier islands of Assawoman Bay, Sinepuxent Bay and Assateague Channel and Bay and the Atlantic Ocean, and the later Ash Wednesday "Nor'easter" of 1962, which destroyed much of the residential development on Assateague Island and led to the creation of the National Seashore and State Park.

The county has a number of properties on the National Register of Historic Places.

== Politics and government ==
Worcester County was granted home rule in 1976 under a state code under the amendments to the fourth Maryland Constitution of 1867. The Circuit Court of Maryland and District Court of Maryland are located in Snow Hill with two district courthouses. The county is governed by a Board of Commissioners elected from seven districts.

The members of the County Council as of 2022 are:

Worcester County Council
Position	Name	Affiliation	District	First Elected
Member	Carolyn Abbott	Republican	1 - Southern	2022
Member	Diana Purnell	Democratic	2 - Central	2014
Member	Eric Fiori	Republican	3 - Sinepuxent	2022
Member	Theodore Elder	Republican	4 - Western	2014
President	Anthony Bertino Jr.	Republican	5 - Ocean Pines	2014
Vice President	Madison Bunting Jr.	Republican	6 - Northern	2010
Member	Joseph Mitrecic	Republican	7 - Ocean City	2014

Worcester County lies wholly in Senate District 38 and is served in the Maryland House of Delegates in Districts 38A and 38C. Members listed below as of 2018 are:

State Senators and Delegates
Position	District	Name	Affiliation	First Elected
Senate	38	Mary Beth Carozza	Republican	2018
House of Delegates	38A	Charles Otto	Republican	2010
House of Delegates	38C	Wayne Hartman	Republican	2018

=== Voter registration ===
Voter registration and party enrollment as of March 2024
Republican	19,485	45.36%
Democratic	13,601	31.66%
Unaffiliated	9,067	21.11%
Libertarian	237	0.55%
Other parties	566	1.32%
Total	42,956	100%

United States presidential election results for Worcester County, Maryland
Year	Republican		Democratic		Third party(ies)	
Year	No.	%	No.	%	No.	%
1892	1,247	34.79%	1,826	50.95%	511	14.26%
1896	1,756	42.59%	1,961	47.56%	406	9.85%
1900	1,991	42.45%	2,449	52.22%	250	5.33%
1904	1,450	40.19%	2,000	55.43%	158	4.38%
1908	1,529	42.26%	1,974	54.56%	115	3.18%
1912	757	23.31%	1,764	54.33%	726	22.36%
1916	1,520	39.72%	2,138	55.87%	169	4.42%
1920	3,090	45.13%	3,676	53.69%	81	1.18%
1924	3,744	38.29%	5,964	60.99%	70	0.72%
1928	4,005	65.29%	2,116	34.50%	13	0.21%
1932	2,178	37.54%	3,593	61.93%	31	0.53%
1936	3,106	46.37%	3,567	53.25%	25	0.37%
1940	3,135	47.46%	3,388	51.29%	83	1.26%
1944	3,018	53.60%	2,613	46.40%	0	0.00%
1948	2,673	53.53%	2,281	45.68%	39	0.78%
1952	4,681	63.13%	2,708	36.52%	26	0.35%
1956	4,465	63.47%	2,570	36.53%	0	0.00%
1960	3,976	54.29%	3,347	45.71%	0	0.00%
1964	2,973	44.47%	3,713	55.53%	0	0.00%
1968	3,541	47.48%	2,046	27.43%	1,871	25.09%
1972	5,584	75.22%	1,792	24.14%	48	0.65%
1976	4,647	53.27%	4,076	46.73%	0	0.00%
1980	5,362	52.38%	4,195	40.98%	679	6.63%
1984	8,208	68.32%	3,770	31.38%	36	0.30%
1988	8,430	63.57%	4,787	36.10%	45	0.34%
1992	7,237	43.70%	6,040	36.48%	3,282	19.82%
1996	7,621	45.01%	7,587	44.81%	1,723	10.18%
2000	10,742	51.76%	9,389	45.24%	622	3.00%
2004	15,349	60.84%	9,648	38.24%	232	0.92%
2008	15,607	57.07%	11,374	41.59%	365	1.33%
2012	15,951	58.17%	11,014	40.17%	455	1.66%
2016	17,210	60.87%	9,753	34.50%	1,310	4.63%
2020	18,571	58.60%	12,560	39.63%	560	1.77%
2024	19,632	59.71%	12,431	37.81%	818	2.49%

== Geography ==
According to the U.S. Census Bureau, the county has a total area of 695 square miles (1,800 km^{2}), of which 468 square miles (1,210 km^{2}) is land and 227 square miles (590 km^{2}) (33%) is water. It is the second-largest county in Maryland by total area (behind Dorchester County) and the fourth-largest by land area.

The terrain is mostly level and coastal. The lowest elevation is sea level along the Atlantic Ocean and the highest elevation is 49 ft (15 m) in the northwestern part of the county along State Route 12 just south of the Wicomico County line.

=== National protected area ===
- Assateague Island National Seashore (part)
- Chincoteague National Wildlife Refuge (part)

=== Adjacent counties ===
- Accomack County, Virginia (south)
- Somerset County (west)
- Sussex County, Delaware (north)
- Wicomico County (northwest)

=== Climate ===
The county has a humid subtropical climate (Cfa.) All monthly temperature averages are above freezing and eight months in most of the county are above 50 °F (10 °C).) Three months are above 22 °C (72 °F).)

Climate data for Ocean City Beach, MD (1981-2010 Averages)
Month	Jan	Feb	Mar	Apr	May	Jun	Jul	Aug	Sep	Oct	Nov	Dec	Year
Record high °F (°C)	77 (25)	78 (26)	88 (31)	94 (34)	98 (37)	102 (39)	103 (39)	100 (38)	99 (37)	94 (34)	84 (29)	78 (26)	103 (39)
Mean daily maximum °F (°C)	44.3 (6.8)	46.3 (7.9)	53.3 (11.8)	62.1 (16.7)	71.0 (21.7)	79.9 (26.6)	84.4 (29.1)	83.2 (28.4)	77.6 (25.3)	68.0 (20.0)	58.4 (14.7)	48.6 (9.2)	64.8 (18.2)
Daily mean °F (°C)	36.7 (2.6)	38.5 (3.6)	45.0 (7.2)	53.8 (12.1)	62.7 (17.1)	72.0 (22.2)	77.0 (25.0)	75.7 (24.3)	69.9 (21.1)	59.5 (15.3)	50.2 (10.1)	41.1 (5.1)	56.9 (13.8)
Mean daily minimum °F (°C)	29.1 (−1.6)	30.8 (−0.7)	36.7 (2.6)	45.4 (7.4)	54.4 (12.4)	64.2 (17.9)	69.5 (20.8)	68.3 (20.2)	62.1 (16.7)	50.9 (10.5)	42.1 (5.6)	33.6 (0.9)	49.0 (9.4)
Record low °F (°C)	−6 (−21)	−2 (−19)	8 (−13)	22 (−6)	30 (−1)	40 (4)	45 (7)	41 (5)	31 (−1)	22 (−6)	15 (−9)	−2 (−19)	−6 (−21)
Average precipitation inches (mm)	3.19 (81)	2.67 (68)	3.61 (92)	3.02 (77)	3.10 (79)	3.18 (81)	3.32 (84)	3.87 (98)	3.02 (77)	3.17 (81)	2.96 (75)	3.21 (82)	38.32 (973)
Average relative humidity (%)	68.8	68.4	63.9	66.0	71.4	74.4	74.8	76.3	74.7	72.9	71.1	69.5	71.0
Average dew point °F (°C)	27.4 (−2.6)	29.0 (−1.7)	33.5 (0.8)	42.7 (5.9)	53.3 (11.8)	63.4 (17.4)	68.4 (20.2)	67.7 (19.8)	61.5 (16.4)	50.8 (10.4)	41.2 (5.1)	31.9 (−0.1)	47.7 (8.7)
Source 1: NOAA
Source 2: PRISM

== Transportation ==
Freight trains run from Snow Hill north to Berlin and the Delaware border on the Maryland and Delaware Railroad, and the main line (formerly Pennsylvania Railroad) from Philadelphia to Cape Charles, Virginia and Norfolk runs through the southwestern corner of the county, operated by the Delmarva Central Railroad. The Ocean City Municipal Airport is located near Ocean City, but has no scheduled service. The nearest airport with commercial air service is the Salisbury–Ocean City–Wicomico Regional Airport near Salisbury.

Shore Transit provides public transportation in Worcester County, operating bus routes connecting Pocomoke City, Snow Hill, Berlin, and Ocean City with Princess Anne and Salisbury. Ocean City Transportation operates bus service branded as Beach Bus in Ocean City. DART First State's Beach Bus Route 208 connects Ocean City with the Delaware Beaches in the summer months.

=== Major highways ===
- US 13
- US 50
- US 113
- US 113 Bus.
- MD 12
- MD 90
- MD 346
- MD 354
- MD 367
- MD 371
- MD 374
- MD 376
- MD 377
- MD 452
- MD 528
- MD 575
- MD 589
- MD 610
- MD 611
- MD 707
- MD 756
- MD 818

== Demographics ==
Historical population
Census	Pop.	Note	%±
1790	11,640		—
1800	16,370		40.6%
1810	16,971		3.7%
1820	17,421		2.7%
1830	18,273		4.9%
1840	18,377		0.6%
1850	18,859		2.6%
1860	20,661		9.6%
1870	16,419		−20.5%
1880	19,539		19.0%
1890	19,747		1.1%
1900	20,865		5.7%
1910	21,841		4.7%
1920	22,309		2.1%
1930	21,624		−3.1%
1940	21,245		−1.8%
1950	23,148		9.0%
1960	23,733		2.5%
1970	24,442		3.0%
1980	30,889		26.4%
1990	35,028		13.4%
2000	46,543		32.9%
2010	51,454		10.6%
2020	52,460		2.0%
2025 (est.)	54,459	▲	3.8%
U.S. Decennial Census; 1790-1960 1900-1990; 1990-2000 2010 2020

=== Racial and ethnic composition ===
Worcester County, Maryland – Racial and ethnic composition Note: the US Census treats Hispanic/Latino as an ethnic category. This table excludes Latinos from the racial categories and assigns them to a separate category. Hispanics/Latinos may be of any race.
Race / Ethnicity (NH = Non-Hispanic)	Pop 1980	Pop 1990	Pop 2000	Pop 2010	Pop 2020	% 1980	% 1990	% 2000	% 2010	% 2020
White alone (NH)	22,456	27,063	37,435	41,331	41,383	72.70%	77.26%	80.43%	80.33%	78.88%
Black or African American alone (NH)	8,031	7,448	7,699	6,973	6,166	26.00%	21.26%	16.54%	13.55%	11.75%
Native American or Alaska Native alone (NH)	36	68	84	126	87	0.12%	0.19%	0.18%	0.24%	0.17%
Asian alone (NH)	79	158	280	569	739	0.26%	0.45%	0.60%	1.11%	1.41%
Native Hawaiian or Pacific Islander alone (NH)	x	x	8	10	5	x	x	0.02%	0.02%	0.01%
Other race alone (NH)	52	16	39	78	166	0.17%	0.05%	0.08%	0.15%	0.32%
Mixed race or Multiracial (NH)	x	x	402	745	1,836	x	x	0.86%	1.45%	3.50%
Hispanic or Latino (any race)	235	275	596	1,622	2,078	0.76%	0.79%	1.28%	3.15%	3.96%
Total	30,889	35,028	46,543	51,454	52,460	100.00%	100.00%	100.00%	100.00%	100.00%

=== 2020 census ===
As of the 2020 census, the county had a population of 52,460, and the median age was 50.5 years. 17.4% of residents were under the age of 18 and 27.5% of residents were 65 years of age or older. For every 100 females there were 93.7 males, and for every 100 females age 18 and over there were 90.7 males. 59.0% of residents lived in urban areas, while 41.0% lived in rural areas.

The racial makeup of the county was 79.8% White, 11.9% Black or African American, 0.3% American Indian and Alaska Native, 1.4% Asian, 0.0% Native Hawaiian and Pacific Islander, 1.6% from some other race, and 5.0% from two or more races. Hispanic or Latino residents of any race comprised 4.0% of the population.

There were 22,871 households in the county, of which 23.1% had children under the age of 18 living with them and 28.5% had a female householder with no spouse or partner present. About 30.0% of all households were made up of individuals and 15.6% had someone living alone who was 65 years of age or older.

There were 56,263 housing units, of which 59.3% were vacant. Among occupied housing units, 75.4% were owner-occupied and 24.6% were renter-occupied. The homeowner vacancy rate was 2.4% and the rental vacancy rate was 22.6%.

=== 2010 census ===
As of the 2010 United States census, there were 51,454 people, 22,229 households, and 14,598 families residing in the county. The population density was 109.9 inhabitants per square mile (42.4/km^{2}). There were 55,749 housing units at an average density of 119.1 per square mile (46.0/km^{2}). The racial makeup of the county was 82.0% white, 13.6% black or African American, 1.1% Asian, 0.3% American Indian, 1.2% from other races, and 1.7% from two or more races. Those of Hispanic or Latino origin made up 3.2% of the population. In terms of ancestry the county was 18.9% German, 18.2% Irish, 17.1% English and 7.7% Italian. If people who wrote they were a combination of "Irish", "English" and "German" (in any order) were counted as one group, they would be 31.9%, and the largest group in the county.

Of the 22,229 households, 24.2% had children under the age of 18 living with them, 50.9% were married couples living together, 10.9% had a female householder with no husband present, 34.3% were non-families, and 28.0% of all households were made up of individuals. The average household size was 2.28 and the average family size was 2.76. The median age was 48.1 years.

The median income for a household in the county was $55,487 and the median income for a family was $67,408. Males had a median income of $44,986 versus $37,785 for females. The per capita income for the county was $31,520. About 6.2% of families and 10.1% of the population were below the poverty line, including 16.2% of those under age 18 and 6.5% of those age 65 or over.

=== 2000 census ===
As of the census of 2000, there were 46,543 people, 19,694 households, and 13,273 families residing in the county. The population density was 98 inhabitants per square mile (38/km^{2}). There were 47,360 housing units at an average density of 100 per square mile (39/km^{2}). The racial makeup of the county was 81.20% White, 16.66% Black or African American, 0.18% Native American, 0.61% Asian, 0.02% Pacific Islander, 0.37% from other races, and 0.97% from two or more races. 1.28% of the population were Hispanic or Latino of any race. 15.7% were of German, 13.3% English, 12.6% Irish, 11.1% American and 6.0% Italian ancestry.

There were 19,694 households, out of which 24.50% had children under the age of 18 living with them, 53.20% were married couples living together, 10.80% had a female householder with no husband present, and 32.60% were non-families. 26.30% of all households were made up of individuals, and 11.60% had someone living alone who was 65 years of age or older. The average household size was 2.33 and the average family size was 2.79.

In the county, the population was spread out, with 20.50% under the age of 18, 6.20% from 18 to 24, 26.40% from 25 to 44, 26.90% from 45 to 64, and 20.10% who were 65 years of age or older. The median age was 43 years. For every 100 females, there were 95.20 males. For every 100 females age 18 and over, there were 92.30 males.

The median income for a household in the county was $40,650, and the median income for a family was $47,293. Males had a median income of $31,735 versus $24,319 for females. The per capita income for the county was $22,505. About 7.20% of families and 9.60% of the population were below the poverty line, including 17.00% of those under age 18 and 6.40% of those age 65 or over.

== Education ==
The following institutions are part of the Worcester County public school system, governed by the Worcester County Board of Education:

- Showell Elementary School
- Buckingham Elementary School
- Ocean City Elementary School
- Snow Hill Elementary School
- Pocomoke Elementary School
- Berlin Intermediate School
- Stephen Decatur Middle School
- Snow Hill Middle School
- Pocomoke Middle School
- Stephen Decatur High School
- Snow Hill High School
- Pocomoke High School
- Worcester Technical High School
- Cedar Chapel Special School

In the fall of 2008 Worcester County has plans to open Worcester Technical High School to all residents of the county, to replace Worcester Career and Technology Center.

The following private schools also operate in Worcester County:

- Worcester Preparatory School
- Seaside Christian Academy
- Most Blessed Sacrament Catholic School
- Snow Hill Mennonite School
- The Tidewater School by the Sea

== Communities ==
This county contains the following incorporated municipalities:

=== City ===
- Pocomoke City

=== Towns ===
- Berlin
- Ocean City
- Snow Hill (county seat)

=== Census-designated places ===
The Census Bureau recognizes the following census-designated places in the county:

- Bishopville
- Girdletree
- Newark
- Ocean Pines
- Stockton
- West Ocean City
- Whaleyville

=== Unincorporated communities ===
- Boxiron
- Cedartown
- Friendship
- Germantown
- Goodwill
- Ironshire
- Klej Grange
- Nassawango Hills
- Public Landing
- Showell
- Sinepuxent
- South Point
- Taylorville
- Whiton (partly in Wicomico County)

== Notable residents ==
- Spiro Agnew, vice president of the United States (1969-1973)
- Fannie Birckhead, community organizer
- Janeen L. Birckhead, military officer
- Stephen Decatur, naval officer
- Linda Harrison, actress

== See also ==
- National Register of Historic Places listings in Worcester County, Maryland

== Sources ==
- Touart, Paul Baker, Along the Seaboard Side: The Architectural History of Worcester County, Maryland (1994).
