= Stephen Decatur High School (Maryland) =

Coordinates: 38.34068°N 75.19009°W

Location
- 9913 Seahawk Road; Berlin, Maryland 21811; United States

Information
- Type: Public High School
- Motto: "The Decatur Way . . . The Way To Grow"
- Established: 1954
- School district: Worcester County Public Schools
- Principal: Thomas Sites
- Grades: 9–12
- Campus: 27.4 acres (111,000 m^{2})
- Colors: Royal Blue and White
- Nickname: Seahawks
- Newspaper: The Hawk
- Website: sdhs.worcesterk12.org

Stephen Decatur High School (commonly Stephen Decatur, Stephen Decatur High, SDHS) is a public high school in Berlin, Worcester County, Maryland, United States. The school is part of the Worcester County Public Schools district and services grades 9–12. The school was opened in 1954.

== History ==
The construction of the school began in 1952. Stephen Decatur High School was opened in 1954. The school was a consolidation of two nearby high schools, Ocean City High School in Ocean City, MD and Buckingham High School in Berlin, MD. Stephen Decatur High School was named after Worcester County native and naval war hero Stephen Decatur. The school originally served grades 7 through 12.

The school is part of the Worcester County Public School system, which also includes three other high schools, Snow Hill High School, Pocomoke High School, and one vocational school, Worcester Technical High School.

The current facility is 192,335 sq ft (17,868.5 m^{2}).

== Academics ==
In 2015 the school had a graduation rate of 93.73%.

== Enrollment ==
The area of West Ocean City, Ocean Pines, and Berlin experienced significant growth in the 1990s and 2000s, and that was reflected in the student population at Stephen Decatur High School. From 895 students in 1993, the school had an enrollment of 1,436 in 2007. The growth of the area slowed around the time of the Great Recession, and as a result the student population at Stephen Decatur has remained relatively steady over the past decade.

Student population

Year	Pop.	±%
1993	895	—
1994	938	+4.8%
1995	985	+5.0%
1996	1,020	+3.6%
1997	1,076	+5.5%
1998	1,111	+3.3%
1999	1,170	+5.3%
2000	1,248	+6.7%
2001	1,251	+0.2%
2002	1,317	+5.3%
2003	1,302	−1.1%

Year	Pop.	±%
2004	1,374	+5.5%
2005	1,384	+0.7%
2006	1,389	+0.4%
2007	1,436	+3.4%
2008	1,389	−3.3%
2009	1,390	+0.1%
2010	1,433	+3.1%
2011	1,436	+0.2%
2012	1,399	−2.6%
2013	1,341	−4.1%
2014	1,316	−1.9%

Year	Pop.	±%
2015	1,299	−1.3%
2016	1,346	+3.6%
2017	1,351	+0.4%
2018	1,348	−0.2%
2019	1,363	+1.1%
2020	1,328	−2.6%
2021	1,369	+3.1%
2022	1,444	+5.5%
2023	1,431	−0.9%
2024	1,403	−2.0%
2025	1,462	+4.2%

== Staff ==
The following people have been the principal at Stephen Decatur High School:

Wilbur A. Jones	1954–1961
D. Keith Whitehurst	1961–1963
William C. Tomlinson	1963–1966
Elmer Everton	1966–1968
Gladys Burbage	1968–1987
Tom Tucker	1987–1991
Anthony McNabb	1991–1994
Louis H. Taylor	1994–2012
Thomas Zimmer	2012–2018
Thomas Sites	2018–Present

== Accomplishments ==
=== Athletics ===
==== State Champions ====
- 2026 – Boys Lacrosse (2A)
- 2025 – Boys Soccer (3A)
- 2024 – Football (2A)
- 2024 – Wrestling (2A)
- 2023 – Football (2A)
- 2023 – Wrestling (2A)
- 2022 – Wrestling (2A)
- 2020 – Wrestling (2A)
- 2019 – Wrestling (3A)
- 2008 – Wrestling (4A-3A)
- 2002 – Boys Soccer (2A)
- 1986 – Boys Track & Field (Class C)
- 1970 – Boys Basketball (Class B)

=== Academics ===
==== Robotics ====
- 2014 – FIRST Robotics Competition Team #4288 North Carolina Regional Champion
- 2013 – FIRST LEGO League – Salisbury Qualifiers Champion
- 2012 – FIRST LEGO League – Salisbury Qualifiers Champion
- 2012 – FIRST Robotics Competition #4288 – Battle of Baltimore

== Notable alumni ==
- Keve Aluma, professional basketball player for the Ryukyu Golden Kings of the B.League.
- Dale R. Cathell, judge, Maryland Court of Appeals
- John Chester, co-creator of Random 1, television program on A&E
- Linda Harrison, actress
- Erica Messer, writer for The OC, Alias, and Criminal Minds
- Oliver Purnell, head basketball coach at DePaul University

== See also ==
- Worcester County Public Schools
- List of high schools in Maryland
