= Ocean Pines, Maryland =

- CDP
- Location in Worcester County and the state of Maryland

- Location within the state of Maryland Ocean Pines (the United States)
- Coordinates: 38°23′1″N 75°9′10″W
- Country: United States
- State: Maryland
- County: Worcester

Government
  - Type: Homeowners' association
  - President, Board of Directors: Richard Farr
  - General Manager: John W Viola

Area
  - Total: 9.06 sq mi (23.47 km^{2})
  - Land: 6.47 sq mi (16.77 km^{2})
  - Water: 2.59 sq mi (6.70 km^{2})
- Elevation: 9.8 ft (3 m)

Population (2020)
  - Total: 12,145
  - Density: 1,875.8/sq mi (724.26/km^{2})
- Time zone: UTC−5 (Eastern (EST))
  - Summer (DST): UTC−4 (EDT)
- ZIP code: 21811
- Area codes: 410, 443, 667
- FIPS code: 24-58275
- GNIS feature ID: 0590933
- Website: http://www.oceanpines.org

Ocean Pines is a census-designated place (CDP) in Worcester County, Maryland, United States. According to the 2020 decennial census, Ocean Pines CDP's total population is 12,145. It is part of the Salisbury, Maryland-Delaware Metropolitan Statistical Area. It shares the same ZIP code as Berlin.

The community began as a small resort in 1968 and today is the largest residential community in Worcester County. It hosts the largest concentration of retirees on the Eastern Shore. During the summer months, Ocean Pines' population swells by more than 50 percent.

== History ==
Prior to the late 1960s, Ocean Pines was a small community, composed primarily of retirees. On May 16, 1968, the Eastern Shore Times newspaper reported the rumor that a multi-million dollar land development project was being considered by the Boise Cascade Corporation in the "Hog Skull" area just north of Berlin. The company began development of the first phase of Ocean Pines on July 12, 1968 and continued at a rapid pace throughout the 1970s. Boise Cascade utilized unique marketing strategies to sell lots "in the middle of nowhere", including Hawaiian luaus, a private clubhouse and pool on the beach of Ocean City, and transportation to Ocean Pines by a double-decker bus and an engine-operated paddlewheel boat named the "Amy Ross". During the 1980s and 1990s, it was normal for 400 new homes to be constructed in the area annually. At the end of 1996, there were 7,381 platted lots and 5,269 dwelling units in the CDP.

In 1969, the Maryland State Highway Administration completed construction on Maryland Route 90, which ran through Ocean Pines and provided access to Ocean City.

Cable television first came to Ocean Pines in 1979 with Triad CATV. Simmons Cable TV took over the agreement with the Ocean Pines Association after acquiring Triad in 1987. Simmons was sold to American Cable TV Investors 5 Ltd. in 1992 and was later acquired by Mediacom in 1997. Mediacom was the only cable and internet service provider in the CDP until 2019, when the Association ratified a 10-year agreement with Comcast.

In 1984, Gerald S. Klein bought $55 million in property for development using Merritt Commercial Savings and Loan assets including a $2 million Maryland Marine wastewater plant. Maple Lawn and Burleigh developer partner Stuart Greenbaum, purchased 800 additional acres for subdivision. In 1985, Worcester County commissioners condemned the Maryland Marine Systems Merritt Commercial Savings and Loan owned sewer system embroiled in the Jeffery Levitt Scandal in order to remove a development moratorium. The system had failed to implement $1.3 million in required maintenance to prevent sewer overflow into the streets creating the moratorium.

In 1994, Balfour Holdings purchased $6–8 million in property. In 1995, Balfour representatives presented the Ocean Pines Association with a plan for a library, post office, church, recreational complex, school, and shopping areas. In October, Balfour and the Ocean Pines Association entered into a turnover agreement for the land.

In 2018, Ocean Pines celebrated its 50th anniversary.

== Geography ==
Ocean Pines is located at 38°23′1″N 75°9′10″W (38.383692, −75.152755).

According to the United States Census Bureau, the CDP has a total area of 9.4 square miles (24 km^{2}), of which 6.7 square miles (17 km^{2}) is land and 2.7 square miles (7.0 km^{2}) (29.0%) is water.

== Demographics ==
Historical population
Census	Pop.	Note	%±
1990	4,251		—
2000	10,496		146.9%
2010	11,710		11.6%
2020	12,145		3.7%

=== 2020 census ===
As of the 2020 census, Ocean Pines had a population of 12,145. The median age was 58.4 years. 13.8% of residents were under the age of 18 and 38.7% were 65 years of age or older. For every 100 females, there were 89.0 males, and for every 100 females age 18 and over, there were 86.7 males.

100.0% of residents lived in urban areas, while 0.0% lived in rural areas.

There were 5,560 households in Ocean Pines, of which 17.8% had children under the age of 18 living in them. Of all households, 55.8% were married-couple households, 13.0% were households with a male householder and no spouse or partner present, and 25.4% were households with a female householder and no spouse or partner present. About 27.0% of all households were made up of individuals and 17.2% had someone living alone who was 65 years of age or older.

There were 8,897 housing units, of which 37.5% were vacant. The homeowner vacancy rate was 1.7% and the rental vacancy rate was 14.2%.

Racial composition as of the 2020 census
Race	Number	Percent
White	11,053	91.0%
Black or African American	266	2.2%
American Indian and Alaska Native	18	0.1%
Asian	160	1.3%
Native Hawaiian and Other Pacific Islander	1	0.0%
Some other race	105	0.9%
Two or more races	542	4.5%
Hispanic or Latino (of any race)	349	2.9%

=== 2010 census ===
At the 2010 census, there were 11,710 people, 5,471 households and 3,457 families residing in the CDP. The population density was 1,758.5 inhabitants per square mile (679.0/km^{2}). There were 8,870 housing units at an average density of 1,323.9 per square mile (511.2/km^{2}). The racial makeup of the CDP was 94.5% White, 2.4% African American, 0.2% Native American, 0.9% Asian, 0.7% from other races, and 1.2% from two or more races. Hispanic or Latino of any race were 2.4% of the population.

There were 5,471 households, of which 10.4% had children under the age of 18 living with them, 60.0% were married couples living together, 7.1% had a female householder with no husband present, and 30.3% were non-families. 25.3% of all households were made up of individuals, and 14.4% had someone living alone who was 65 years of age or older. The average household size was 2.14 and the average family size was 2.50.

16.8% of the population were under the age of 18, 4.1% from 18 to 24, 15.4% from 25 to 44, 32.0% from 45 to 64, and 34.5% who were 65 years of age or older. The median age was 57.6 years. For every 100 females, there were 92.7 males. For every 100 females age 18 and over, there were 90.3 males.

The median household income was $46,328 and the median family income was $76,123. Males had a median income of $51,489 compared with $42,261 for females. The per capita income for the CDP was $40,418. About 1.5% of families and 4.0% of the population were below the poverty line, including 5.0% of those under age 18 and 2.9% of those age 65 or over.

== Parks and recreation ==
Ocean Pines is home to the Ocean Pines Golf Club, which was designed by Robert Trent Jones in 1970 and opened on June 5, 1972. It also homes 13 different parks, with the largest being White Horse Park.

Community parks:

- Bainbridge Park
- Bridgewater Park
- Dog Park
- Huntington Park
- Manklin Meadows Park
- Pintail Park
- Robin Hood Park
- Skate Park
- Somerset Park
- Swim and Racquet Club Park
- Terns Landing Park
- White Horse Park
- Veterans Memorial Park

== Government ==
In 1971, Boise Cascade formed the Ocean Pines Association. The company turned over control to the Association in August 1973. The current OPA Board of Directors consists of President Colette Horn, Vice President Frank Daly, Treasurer Larry Perrone, Secretary Josette Wheatley, Director Richard Farr, and Directors Doug Parks and Amy Peck. The board holds annual elections to elect its members.

In April 1993, the Worcester County Commissioners established Election District Six, which represents Ocean Pines in the county government. Today, the town is represented by Districts 5 and 6 in the Board of County Commissioners, which are currently represented by Republicans Anthony W. "Chip" Bertino, Jr. and Madison J. Bunting, Jr.

Ocean Pines is included in Maryland's 1st congressional district.

== Education ==
Ocean Pines is served by the Worcester County Public Schools system.

Public schools that serve students in the Ocean Pines area:

- Berlin Intermediate School
- Showell Elementary School
- Stephen Decatur Middle School
- Stephen Decatur High School
- Ocean City Elementary School

Worcester Preparatory School and Most Blessed Sacrament Catholic School are a private schools in the Ocean Pines area.
