= Showell, Maryland =

Unincorporated community in Maryland, United States

- Unincorporated community
- Location within Maryland Location within the United States
- Coordinates: 38°23′52″N 75°12′54″W
- Country: United States
- State: Maryland
- County: Worcester
- Elevation: 26 ft (7.9 m)
- Time zone: UTC-5 (Eastern (EST))
  - Summer (DST): UTC-4 (EDT)
- ZIP code: 21862
- Area codes: 410, 443, and 667
- GNIS feature ID: 591285

Showell is an unincorporated community in Worcester County, Maryland, United States. Showell is located at the intersection of Worcester Highway and Pitts Road west of U.S. Route 113 to the north of Berlin. The community takes its name from Samuel Showell, the owner of the original land grant upon which the town sits. Samuel Showell and his descendants owned several large parcels in the area, of which this was the largest, which were gradually divided among family members and then eventually sold off.

St. Martin's Episcopal Church was listed on the National Register of Historic Places in 1977.

== Notable person ==
- Russell O. Hickman, Maryland legislator and businessman, was born in Showell.
