= Friendship, Worcester County, Maryland =

Unincorporated community in Maryland, United States

Friendship, Maryland
- Unincorporated community
- Location within Maryland
- Coordinates: 38°22′18″N 75°12′41″W
- Country: United States
- State: Maryland
- County: Worcester
- Elevation: 26 ft (7.9 m)
- Time zone: UTC-5 (Eastern (EST))
  - Summer (DST): UTC-4 (EDT)
- Area codes: 410 & 443
- GNIS feature ID: 584508

Friendship is an unincorporated community in Worcester County, Maryland, United States. Friendship is located along U.S. Route 113, 3.4 miles (5.5 km) north of Berlin.
