= Cipriani (surname) =

Cipriani is a surname. Notable people with the surname include:

- Alessandro Cipriani (born 1959), Italian composer
- Amilcare Cipriani (1843–1918), Italian anarchist
- Andre Cipriani (died 1953), Trinidadian cricketer
- Antoine Cipriani (born 1954), French sprint canoer
- Arthur Andrew Cipriani (1875–1945), a Trinidadian labour leader and politician
- Belo Cipriani (born 1980), Guatemalan-American writer, activist and entrepreneur
- Carmela Cipriani (born 1996), Italian racing cyclist
- Danny Cipriani (born 1987), English rugby player
- Der Reka Cipriani (born 1943), Italian Olympic fencer
- Francesca Cipriani (born 1984), Italian television host and celebrity
- Frank A. Cipriani, university president
- Georges Cipriani (born 1950), former member of Action directe
- Giacomo Cipriani (born 1980), Italian football player
- Giovanni Battista Cipriani (1727–1785), also called Giuseppe Cipriani, Italian painter and engraver
- Giuseppe Cipriani (chef) (1900–1980), founded Harry's Bar in Venice in 1931
- Giuseppe Cipriani (racing driver) (born 1966), Italian racing driver
- Jean-Baptiste Cipriani (c. 1773–1818), Corsican maître d'hôtel and friend of Napoleon Bonaparte
- Jerry Cipriani, Canadian football (soccer) player
- Juan Luis Cipriani Thorne (born 1943), the Roman Catholic Archbishop of Lima
- Lidio Cipriani (1892–1962), Italian anthropologist and explorer
- Luciano Cipriani (born 1981), Argentine footballer
- Luigi Cipriani (born 1980), Italian footballer
- Mario Cipriani (1909–1944), Italian racing cyclist
- Mikey Cipriani (1886–1934), Trinidadian cricketer
- Nazzareno Cipriani (1843–1925), Italian painter
- Renato Cipriani (born 1917), Italian footballer
- Sebastiano Cipriani (1662–1738), Italian architect of the late Baroque period
- Simone Cipriani (born 1964), Italian officer of the United Nations
- Stelvio Cipriani (1937–2018), Italian composer

== See also ==
- Cipriani (disambiguation)
- Cipriano (surname)
