= Cipriani S.A. =

International luxury restaurant and club operator based in Luxembourg

- Entrance of a Cipriani restaurant in Dubai
- Type: Private (Société anonyme)
- Industry: Hospitality, restaurants, private clubs, real estate
- Founded: 1931 (Harry's Bar, Venice)
- Founder: Giuseppe Cipriani
- Headquarters: Luxembourg
- Key people: Giuseppe Cipriani
- Products: Restaurants, event venues, hotels and private clubs (Casa Cipriani), branded residences
- Owner: Cipriani family
- Website: www.cipriani.com

Cipriani S.A. is an Italian hotel and leisure company domiciled in Luxembourg that owns and operates luxury restaurants and clubs around the world including Harry's Bar in Venice and formerly the Rainbow Room in New York City. It specialises in simple, traditional Italian food.

Harry's Bar was founded by Giuseppe Cipriani in 1931. It became a popular spot for celebrities like Ernest Hemingway and Humphrey Bogart. Cipriani created the Bellini cocktail and the food dish Carpaccio there.

Giuseppe's son Arrigo Cipriani (born 1932) is the majority owner. Arrigo is Italian for Harry. His son Giuseppe Cipriani (born 1965) is the main business manager.

== History ==
=== Foundation and early years (1931–1980) ===
Cipriani S.A. traces its history to family patriarch Giuseppe Cipriani who founded Harry's Bar in Venice in 1931. According to the company history, Harry Pickering, a young Bostonian, had been frequenting Hotel Europa in Venice, where Cipriani was a bartender. When Pickering explained that he was broke because his family had found out his drinking habits and cut him off financially, Cipriani loaned Pickering 10,000 lire (about $500 US [$7,839 in 2015 dollars]). Two years later, Pickering returned to the hotel bar, ordered a drink, and gave Cipriani 50,000 lire in return. "Mr. Cipriani, thank you," he said, according to the Cipriani website. "Here's the money. And to show you my appreciation, here's 40,000 more, enough to open a bar. We will call it Harry's Bar."

Harry's Bar became an internationally renowned meeting place for writers, artists and celebrities, including Ernest Hemingway, Humphrey Bogart and Orson Welles. Giuseppe Cipriani is credited with creating the Bellini cocktail, traditionally made with Prosecco and white peach purée, and carpaccio, a dish consisting of thinly sliced raw beef named after the Venetian painter Vittore Carpaccio. The establishment became closely associated with traditional Venetian cuisine and hospitality.

In 1936, Giuseppe Cipriani acquired a small tavern on the island of Torcello in the Venetian Lagoon, which he subsequently transformed into Locanda Cipriani, a restaurant and inn. The establishment became a destination for prominent visitors, including Ernest Hemingway and members of European royalty. It was later managed by Giuseppe's daughter Carla Cipriani and her son Bonifacio Brass, who operated it for approximately 40 years. In May 2023, the establishment returned to the control of the Cipriani family business led by Giuseppe Cipriani, grandson of the founder.

In 1958, Giuseppe Cipriani established Hotel Cipriani on the island of Giudecca in Venice. The hotel subsequently passed into separate ownership, creating a distinction between the hotel business and the Cipriani family's restaurant operations. This separation later resulted in legal disputes concerning the commercial use of the Cipriani name.

=== International expansion (1980–2000) ===
Under Giuseppe Cipriani's son Arrigo and grandson Giuseppe, the family business expanded internationally, with New York becoming its principal market outside Italy. In December 1985, the company opened Harry Cipriani at the Sherry-Netherland Hotel on Fifth Avenue in Manhattan. The restaurant was modelled on the original Harry's Bar in Venice and marked the beginning of the group's expansion in the United States.

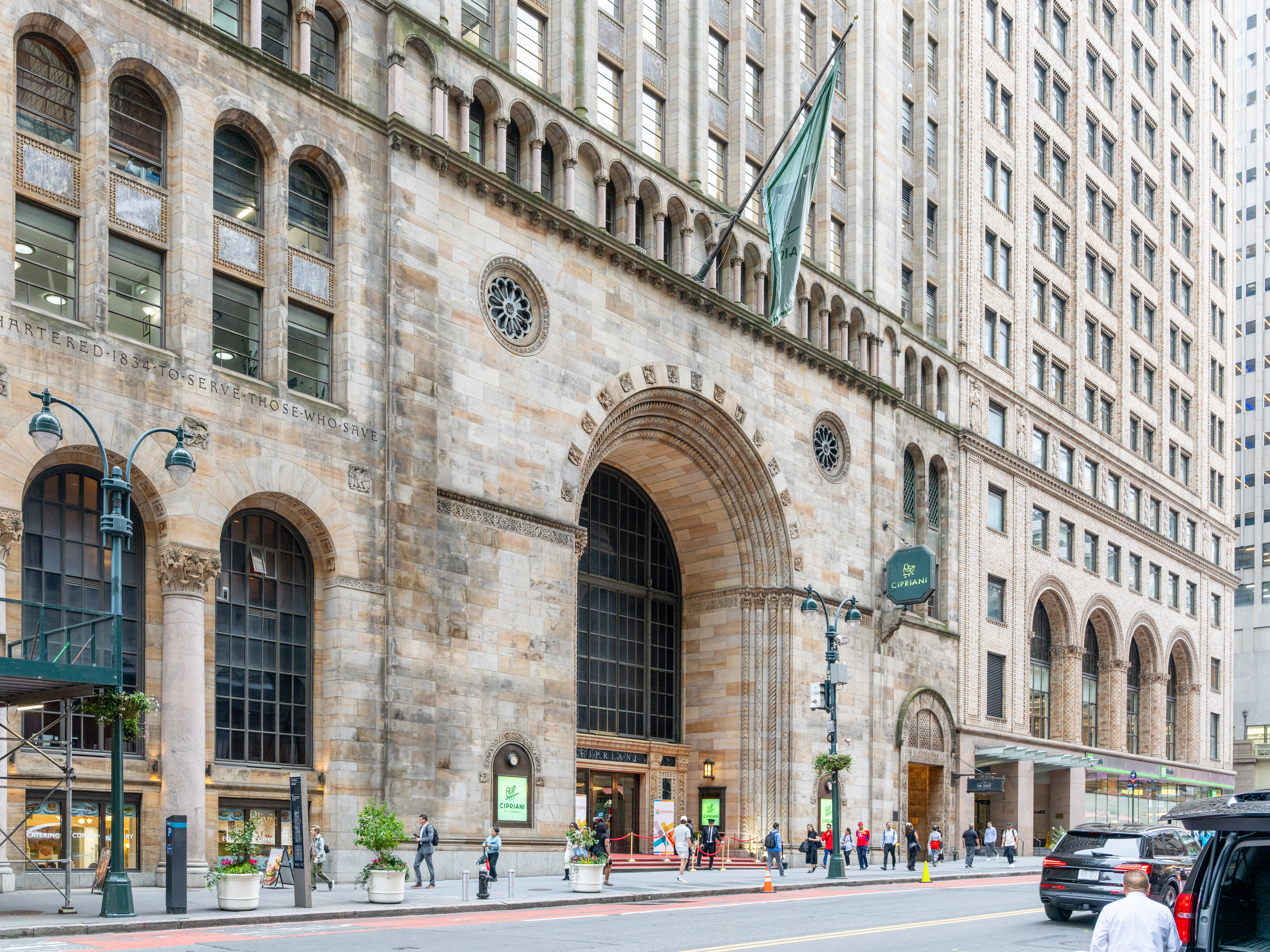
110 East 42nd Street

During the 1990s, Cipriani expanded its New York operations beyond traditional restaurants, developing large-scale event and banquet venues in historic Manhattan buildings. The company became associated with landmark properties including 55 Wall Street, a former banking headquarters, and the Bowery Savings Bank building at 110 East 42nd Street, near Grand Central Terminal. These venues contributed to the group's development of a business model combining restaurants with private events, corporate functions and luxury hospitality.

In 1998, Cipriani took over operations of the Rainbow Room, the historic restaurant and entertainment venue at Rockefeller Center. The establishment became one of the group's most prominent New York locations, although its management was subsequently marked by labour disputes and disagreements with the building's owner.

=== Expansion and legal disputes (2000–2010) ===
During the 2000s, Cipriani continued expanding its restaurant and hospitality operations internationally. In April 2004, the company opened a restaurant on Davies Street in London's Mayfair district. The expansion subsequently became the subject of a trademark dispute with Orient-Express Hotels, the owner of Hotel Cipriani in Venice, concerning the commercial use of the Cipriani name.

The group also pursued real estate investments and hospitality developments in the United States. Its expansion strategy included the acquisition and redevelopment of prominent Manhattan properties, as well as projects combining restaurants, entertainment venues and luxury residences. In 2006, Cipriani partnered with American real estate developer Steve Witkoff in the acquisition of 55 Wall Street, a historic building in Manhattan's Financial District.

In 2007, Arrigo and Giuseppe Cipriani pleaded guilty to misdemeanour tax offences in New York following an investigation into the group's tax reporting. The case concerned approximately $3.5 million in unpaid state and city taxes over several years. The settlement included financial penalties and the appointment of an independent auditor to monitor future tax payments.

In December 2008, the High Court of England and Wales ruled that Orient-Express Hotels (which owns the Hotel Cipriani) owns the Cipriani trademark and that the use of "Cipriani" in the name of the London restaurant infringed its trademark rights. The decision was upheld on appeal by the Court of Appeal on 24 February 2010, which ordered that the restaurant's name would have to be changed by 24 April 2010. The new name of the restaurant is "C".

In January 2009, the Ciprianis announced plans to close the Rainbow Room in a dispute with the owner of 30 Rock, Tishman Speyer Properties. Tishman in turn responded that it was evicting the Ciprianis from the Rainbow Room.

=== Diversification into luxury hospitality and private clubs (2010–2023) ===
During the 2010s and early 2020s, Cipriani increasingly diversified beyond its traditional restaurant business, expanding into luxury hotels, private members' clubs, branded residences and hospitality-related real estate developments. The company continued to operate internationally under the leadership of Giuseppe Cipriani, representing the third generation of the founding family.

In September 2021, the group opened Casa Cipriani New York in the historic Battery Maritime Building in Lower Manhattan. The development combined a private members' club, a luxury hotel with 47 rooms and suites, restaurants, bars, wellness facilities and event spaces overlooking New York Harbor. The project represented an important step in the group's expansion into integrated luxury hospitality.

In 2022, Casa Cipriani Milano opened near the Giardini Indro Montanelli in Milan, combining hotel accommodation, restaurants and private club facilities. The development was part of the group's strategy to establish the Casa Cipriani concept in major international cities.

In October 2023, Cipriani announced plans for a €500 million hospitality investment fund in partnership with Optimum Asset Management and Crédit des Alpes. The initiative was intended to finance the international expansion of Casa Cipriani hotels and private members' clubs, as well as Cipriani-branded residential developments. The proposed fund reflected the group's increasing focus on capital-intensive hospitality and property investments.

=== Real estate expansion (2024–2026) ===
During the mid-2020s, Cipriani pursued several major real estate developments, including branded residential projects in Miami, Dubai and Uruguay. These projects marked a further diversification of the company's business model, combining luxury hospitality operations with residential property development.

In 2024, construction began on Cipriani Resort, Residences and Casino in Punta del Este, Uruguay, on the site of the former Hotel San Rafael. The development includes the reconstruction of the historic hotel, three residential towers, a casino, restaurants, a convention centre, a spa and other luxury amenities. The project became one of the group's largest international investments.

In January 2025, Bloomberg Línea reported that the Punta del Este development represented an investment of approximately $600 million. According to Giuseppe Cipriani, around 40% of the apartments in the first residential tower had already been sold, including a penthouse purchased for $17.1 million. The project was described as the largest real estate investment in the history of Punta del Este.

=== Financial structure and financing (2023–2026) ===
In 2023, French billionaire Xavier Niel, founder of telecommunications group Iliad, provided a €267 million loan to the Cipriani group through his investment company Const Invest. According to an investigation published by Corriere della Sera in April 2026, the loan carried an annual interest rate of 2% and was scheduled to mature on 30 January 2029.

The investigation reported that Cipriani Group held approximately €400 million in assets and recorded a net profit of €31 million in 2024. The group operated around 40 restaurants, hotels and private clubs internationally, while pursuing major real estate developments, particularly in Punta del Este, Uruguay, and Dubai.

== Properties ==
Venice
- Harry's Bar (Venice).
- Harry's Dolci (on Giudecca).
New York City
- Harry Cipriani Bar, 781 Fifth Avenue.
- 55 Wall Street. The family owns the building which now consists of a private club, residences and the restaurant.
- Cipriani 42nd Street at 110 East 42nd Street.
- Cipriani Dolci in Grand Central Terminal.
- Rainbow Grill atop 30 Rockefeller Center (closed June 2009)
- Cipriani 23rd Street (in the International Toy Center) (closed January 2009)
- Cipriani 25 Broadway (in the building's grand hall) which opened in October 2014
- Cipriani Downtown
- Casa Cipriani, September 2021

London
- C London (in Mayfair).
Los Angeles
- Cipriani Beverly Hills (planned in 2010 in the former Tower Beverly Hills Hotel).
Ibiza
- Cipriani's Downtown & Bellini Lounge Club
- Booom! IBIZA

Porto Cervo
- Cipriani Porto Cervo.
Hong Kong
- Cipriani Hong Kong.
Miami Beach
- Cipriani Ocean Beach and Club Residences (at the Saxony Hotel).
Istanbul
- Cipriani Istanbul (at the Edition Hotel)
Mexico
- Cipriani Mexico City
Monaco
- Cipriani Monaco
Saint-Tropez
- Cipriani Saint-Tropez
Uruguay
- Cipriani Punta del Este.
