= Harry's Bar =

Harry's Bar may refer to:

== Drinking establishments and restaurants ==
- Harry's Bar (Rome), Italy, a historic bar and restaurant featured in La Dolce Vita
- Harry's Bar (Venice), Italy, home of the Bellini and Carpaccio
- Harry's New York Bar, Paris, France, said to be the birthplace of several classic cocktails
- Harry's Bar (London), Mayfair, London, a private members dining club established by Mark Birley
- Harry's Bar, Wigan, England, the trading name of the Clarence Hotel, a pub and usual venue of the World Pie Eating Championship
- Harry's Bar, Holland Village
- Harry's Bar, Marshall Street, Syracuse, New York, United States
- Harry’s Bar, Cernobbio (CO), Italy

== Other uses ==
- Harry's Bar, a 2002 album by Gordon Haskell

== See also ==
- Sir Harry's Bar, in the Waldorf Astoria New York, U.S.
