= Cipriano =

Cipriano may refer to:

- Cipriano (given name), a masculine given name
- Cipriano (surname), a surname
