= 1692 in poetry =

Nationality words link to articles with information on the nation's poetry or literature (for instance, Irish or France).

== Events ==
- February 16 - Julije Balović completes transcription of Junije Palmotić's drama Danica to which he appends three poems of unknown authors, including "Blind man sings of love events" (Serbian: Slijepac pjeva zgode koje ljubav nosi).
- November - Nahum Tate becomes Poet Laureate of England.

== Works published ==
- Richard Ames:
  - The Double Descent, published anonymously
  - The Jacobite Conventicle, published anonymously
  - Sylvia's Complaint, of Her Sexes Unhappiness, anonymous reply to Robert Gould's Love Given O're of 1682 (see also Sylvia's Revenge 1688)
- Richard Baxter, translator, Paraphrase on the Psalms of David
- John Crowne, translator, The Daeneids, translation of Le Lutrin from the original French of Boileau
- John Dennis, Poems in Burlesque, published anonymously
- John Dryden, Eleonora, an elegy in honor of the Countess of Abingdon, whom he'd never seen, written for a lucrative fee; one of Dryden's most easygoing critics, Sir Walter Scott, called it "totally deficient of interest", and Mark Van Doren described it as a "catalogue of female Christian virtues, virtues which Dryden was not much moved by. It suffers from a threadbare piety everywhere except at the end [...]"
- Thomas Fletcher, Poems on Several Occasions, and Translations, in his preface, the author condemned rhyme in poetry
- Charles Gildon, editor, Miscellany Poems upon Several Occasions, anthology
- Matthew Prior, An Ode in Imitation of the Second Ode of the Third Book of Horace
- William Walsh, Letters and Poems, amorous and Gallant, published anonymously

== Births ==
Death years link to the corresponding "[year] in poetry" article:

- February 29 - John Byrom (died 1763), English poet
- November 6 - Louis Racine (died 1763), French poet
- November 21 - Carlo Innocenzo Frugoni (died 1768), Italian poet
- Li E (died 1752), Chinese poet

== Deaths ==
Birth years link to the corresponding "[year] in poetry" article:

- September 21 - Ermes di Colorêt (born 1622), Friulian courtier and poet
- November 19 - Thomas Shadwell (born c. 1642), English poet and playwright, Poet Laureate from 1689

== See also ==
- Poetry
- 17th century in poetry
- 17th century in literature
