= Carlo Favetti =

Italian politician (1819–1892)

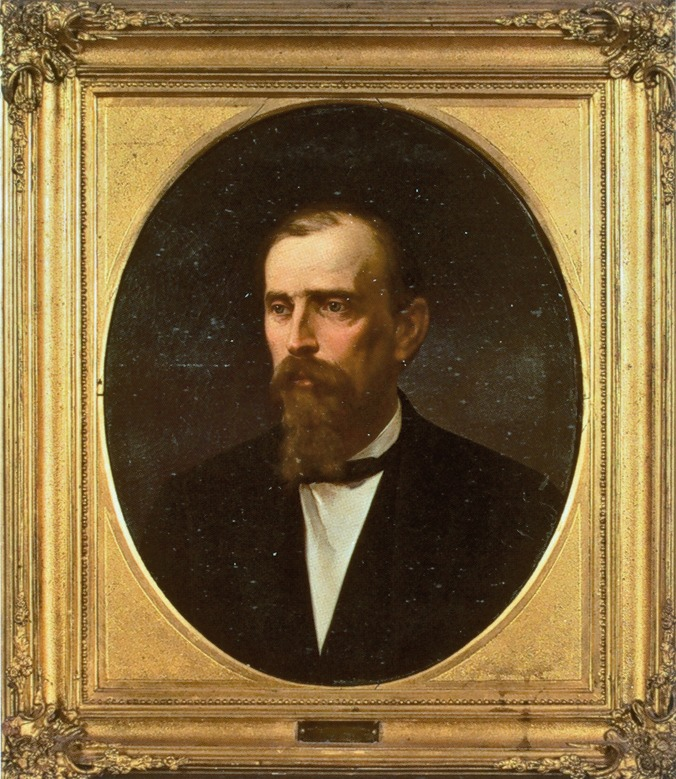
Portrait of Favetti by Antonio Rotta, 1869

Carlo Favetti (30 August 1819 – 30 November 1892) was an Italian politician and lawyer from Gorizia, who also wrote poetry in the Friulian language. He was the founder and leader of Italian irredentism in Gorizia and Gradisca.

He was born in Gorizia, in the Austrian Empire (now in Italy), in a wealthy middle-class family. His father was a lawyer, and his mother was the granddaughter of the historian Giuseppe Cipriani. After finishing the classical gymnasium in Gorizia, he enrolled at the University of Vienna, where he studied law. Upon returning to Gorizia, he joined several Italian patriotic associations. In 1850, he founded the newspaper Il Giornale di Gorizia, which was abolished by the Austrian authorities in 1851.

After the restoration of political liberties in the Austrian Empire in 1861, he was elected mayor of Gorizia. The Austrian government however refused to confirm the nomination. Nevertheless, he remained an influential figure in the local administration; under his supervision, an extensive building program was carried out in Gorizia.

In 1866, during the Third Italian War of Independence, Favetti was arrested by the Austrian authorities, and sentenced to six years of imprisonment for subversive activities. Already the following year, he was released. Fearing another arrest, Favetti escaped to Italy in 1868, settling in Venice. After the amnesty of 1871, he returned to Gorizia. In 1877, he was re-elected to the city council of Gorizia, where he remained until his death on 30 November 1892.

He wrote several poems and plays in the local version of the Friulian language.

== Major works ==
- Doi quadris della vita popolar gurizzana ('Two Sketches of the Folk Life in Gorizia'; 1882).
- Fusilir e granatir, un scherz comic ('The Fusilier and the Grenadier: A Satirical Play'; 1891).
- Leonardo Papes. Un zittadin gurizzan del 1500 ('Leonardo Papes. A Citizen of Gorizia from 1500; 1892).
- Rime e prose in vernacolo goriziano ('Rhimes and Prose in the Vernacular of Gorizia; Udine, 1893).

== See also ==
- Friuli
- Friulian literature
- Austrian Littoral
- Julian March
- Ethnic and religious composition of Austria–Hungary
