= Cipriano (surname) =

Cipriano is a surname. Notable people with the surname include:

- Antonio Cipriano (born 2000), American actor
- Gene Cipriano (1927–2022), American musician
- Gustavo Cipriano (born 2001), Brazilian footballer
- Joana Cipriano (1996–2004), Portuguese murder victim
- João Luiz da Silva Cipriano (born 2002), Brazilian footballer
- Joe Cipriano (born 1954), American voice actor
- Joe Cipriano (basketball) (1931–1980), American college basketball player
- Kean Cipriano (born 1987), Filipino singer
- Marcelo dos Santos Cipriano (born 1969), Brazilian-Portuguese footballer
- Marcos Antonio Aparecido Cipriano (born 1973), Brazilian footballer
- Olimpio Cipriano (born 1982), Angolan professional basketball player
- Petey Cipriano (born 1983), American-Cape-Verdean basketball coach and former player
- Renee Cipriano (21st century), American lobbyist
- Patch Cipriano, fictional character from the book Hush, Hush
- Tucker Cipriano (born 1993), convicted murderer

== See also ==
- Cipriano (given name)
- Cypriano
- Cipriani (surname)
