= Bregans lens =

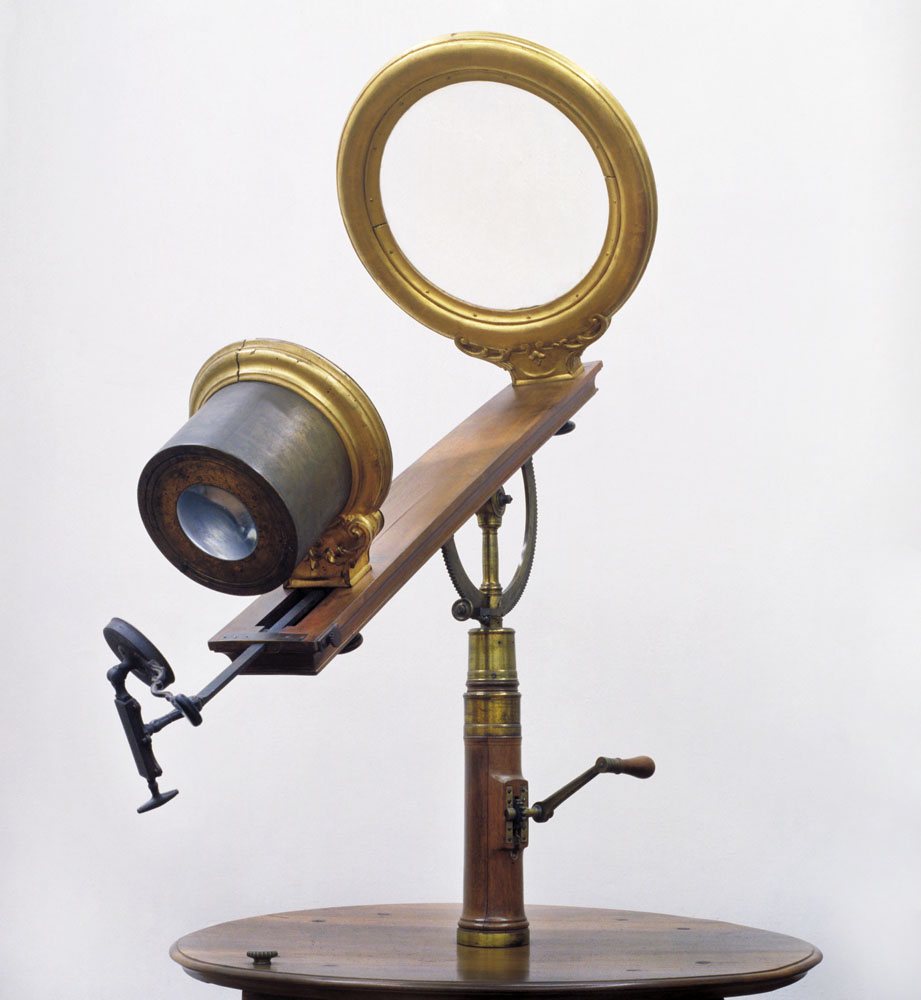
The Bregans lens

The Bregans lens is a large lens, mounted in a gilt wooden frame, with a focal length of 1,580 mm. Another smaller lens acts as a condenser and can be positioned by means of a sliding mechanism along a supporting track. Beyond the condenser is a small adjustable metal plate for holding specimens. The wooden mount on a small table fitted with castors, dated 1767, is the work of the Florentine artisan Francesco Spighi; the metal parts are signed by Gaspero Mazzeranghi. The maker of the lens, Benedetto Bregans, donated it to Cosimo III de' Medici in 1697. The instrument was used some time later by Giuseppe Averani and Cipriano Targioni for experiments on the combustion of diamonds and other precious stones. In 1814, Humphry Davy — on a visit to Florence with Michael Faraday — used the lens to repeat Averani's experiments. In 1860, Giovanni Battista Donati mounted the lens on a tube (inv. 582) for use as a starlight condenser to observe the absorption bands of stellar spectra.
