= Spighi =

Spighi is an Italian surname. Notable people with the surname include:

- Cesare Spighi (1854–1929), Italian engineer and architect
- Francesco Spighi (18th century), Florentine artisan
- Garibaldi Spighi (1891–1978), Italian horse rider
- Mirco Spighi (born 1990), Italian football player
