= Friulian literature =

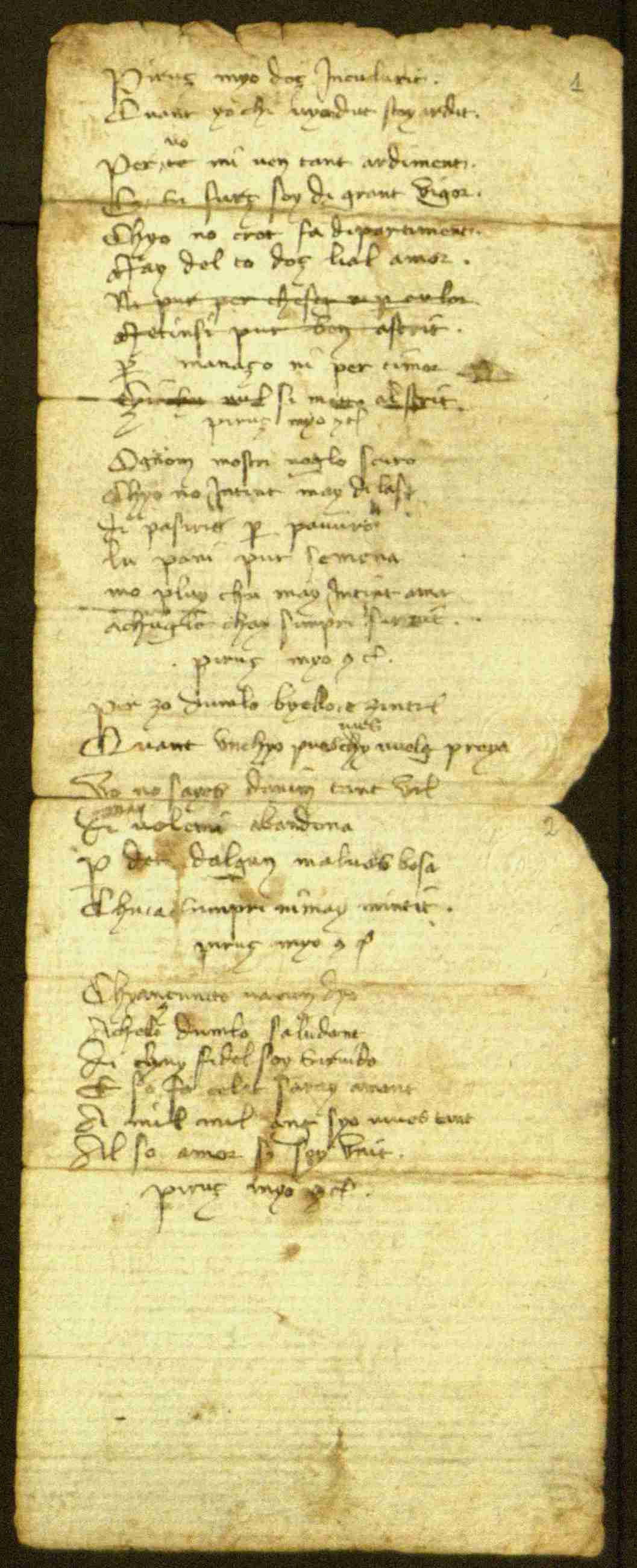
The poem Piruç myò doç inculurit, 14th-century paper manuscript by the notary Antonio Porenzoni

Friulian (or Friulan) literature is the literature of the autonomous Italian region of Friuli, written in the local Friulian language.

== Early ==
The oldest surviving poems in Friulian date from the 14th century. They are songs of ballads: Piruç myò doç inculurit ("Sweet Blush Pear of Mine", before 1380), Biello dumnlo di valor ("Fair Lady of Worth") and the Soneto furlan ("Friulian Sonnet"). Vernacular Friulian phrases and spellings occasionally made their way into otherwise Latin documents. Giovanni Frau cites an early example from 1284. Paola Benincà quotes documents from 1355, 1360, 1380 and 1389.

A fuller Friulian literature dates back only to the 19th century, when Friuli, after the Congress of Vienna, fell entirely under the control of the Austrian empire. This late flourishing had several causes: first, the language of the culture and administration had never been Friulian, but Latin and partly German under the Patriarchal State of Aquileia and Italian, mixed with Venetian under the Serenissima rule. Moreover, Friuli never saw the formation of a literate bourgeoisie that could have fostered the language, in order to have a literary development similar to other European languages. During the 16th century for example, there were only limited poetic forms in Friulian inspired by the works of Francesco Petrarca, including the poems of Nicolò Morlupino from Venzone (1528-1570) and Girolamo Biancone from Tolmezzo (1515-1580). Also, until 1800 there were no printed works in Friulian, so the diffusion of poetry and other works was restricted to a small number of persons.

== 17th century ==
During this period, the most important Friulian authors were Ciro di Pers (1599-1663), poet and man of letters; Eusebi Stele (Eusebio Stella) of Spilimbergo (1602-1671), born to a noble family, who composed poems in a playful and ironic style about his life and love adventures; and the count Ermes di Colorêt (1622-1692), notable mainly for his use of the koinè from Udine, that would become the most notable literary language and the basis of today's standard Friulian. Ermes was educated at Medici's court in Florence, then took part in the Thirty Years' War, worked in the service of the Venetian Republic and Leopold I of Habsburg; in the last part of his life he returned to his homeland to focus on writing poetry, most of which centers on the theme of love.

Ermes di Colloredo: Poesie Friulane, l’Opera Completa". LiteraryJoint Press, Philadelphia, PA, 2019. The complete work of Ermes Earl of Colloredo, full text. ISBN 978-0-359-73730-7 ISBN 978-0-359-38863-9

== 18th century ==
This century was undoubtedly poor in the development of Friulian literature, probably due to the increasing influence of the Venetian language in the city of Udine. Noteworthy, though, was the publication of the first Friulian almanac (strolic or lunari in Friulian) in 1742. The almanac contained short stories, poems and agricultural advice, with an item for each day of the year; these kinds of works would be very popular in the following centuries.

== 19th century ==
The first half of the century was similar to the previous one. The primary Friulian author of the 19th century, and today probably the best known in all of Friulian literature, was Pieri Çorut (Pietro Zorutti, 1792–1867). Çorut's poetry was plain, far removed from the popular romanticism of the period; he devoted himself mainly to the almanacs, called Strolic furlans, published yearly from 1821 until 1867. His most famous work is Plovisine, composed in 1833. Çorut enjoyed great popularity in Friuli during his life and many tried to imitate his style. Today he is respected mainly for his usage of Central Friulian, which he sought to elevate to a literary language. Another author of almanacs was Antoni Broili (1796–1876), who achieved better results from the literary point of view.

In the second half of the century, the city of Gorizia was generally more vivacious than that of Udine; there was a different feeling of "Friulanity," and the environment was mitteleuropean, since the city (part of the county of Gorizia and Gradisca) was under the rule of Austro-Hungarian empire, while Udine was annexed to the Kingdom of Italy in 1866. In Gorizia, many tried to use the Friulian language in different fields, such as the applied sciences, with good results; one example from the period is the almanac Il me paîs. Strenna popolâr pal 1855 by Federico de Comelli of Gradisca (1826-1892). Carlo Favetti from Gorizia also published several books of poetry and plays in the local Friulian dialect.

An important literary event, although very late in comparison to other European languages, was the publication of the first Friulian vocabulary, composed by abbot Jacopo Pirona and his nephew Giulio Andrea (1871), which is still a valuable language resource today. In 1873, Graziadio Isaia Ascoli published an analysis of Friulian. Ascoli started the so-called Questione Ladina.

Also deserving of mention is Caterina Percoto, who has an important role in Italian literature of this century, but who left only a few works in Friulian, mainly regarding popular traditions.

== 20th century ==
At the beginning of 1900 Friuli seemed far from the numerous avant-gardes of the period, at least in part due to its difficult historical situation; the regional request for autonomy received no response from the Italian authorities, and in 1933 the fascist regime prohibited any publications in Friulian. The most important authors of this time were Vittorio Cadel of Fanna (1884-1917), who composed poems with a sensual background, concealing a deep feeling of sadness and discouragement; Ercole Carletti (1877-1946) of Udine, author of poems in a style close to Italian crepuscolarismo; and Celso Cescutti. A rare example of political and civil themes can be found in Giovanni Minut's Rimis furlanis (1921). Minut, born in Visco in 1895, was forced to flee to Uruguay when the fascists came to power; he died there in 1967.

In the area of Gorizia, Delfo Zorzut of Cormons composed various collections of short stories (La furlane, Sturiutis furlanis) and gathered many popular legends and traditions, useful to keep alive an interest in the language.

But the most important Friulian work of the 20th century was the Academiuta di lenga furlana, founded by Pier Paolo Pasolini. Pasolini collected a group of writers in order to go beyond the old poetry inspired by Pieri Çorut's works, which was still imitated, to create a new and modern Friulian poetry. Other noteworthy figures in the movement include Domenico Naldini (Pasolini's cousin) and Riccardo Castellani. Neither, however, reached the poetical heights of their leader. Their works were in the Concordiese dialect of Friulian, in polemic with the use of Central Friulian as the only literary standard.

Other developments after World War II included the lyrical works of Franco de Gironcoli, from Gorizia. Gironcoli studied and analysed poems from Ermes di Colorêt and the Pirona vocabulary, and from 1944 on he composed several short lyrics, dedicated mainly to the flowing of time.

Josef Marchet, a priest, began the difficult work of promoting and standardizing the language; he tried to arrange a Friulian grammatic in Lineamenti di grammatica friulana, with the purpose of developing a standard variant of the language. In 1950 he also published the collection Risultive, wherein were gathered the works of several interesting Friulian poets of the time (including Novella Cantarutti from Spilimbergo; Dino Virgili, composer of the novel L'aghe dapit la cleve; and Lelo Cjanton (Aurelio Cantoni)).

1971 saw the publication of a translation with the title Prime di sere of the novel Il vento nel vigneto, written in Italian by the Friulian writer Carlo Sgorlon, which enjoyed a good success.

== 21st century ==
While poets and song writers in Friuli continue to keep the language alive, Friulan has been used in Toronto, Canada, for many years by immigrants from Friuli. A notable example is the bilingual poem collection, From Friuli: Poems in Friulan, with English Translations, (2015) by Rina Del Nin Cralli and edited by Joseph Pivato. Rina is originally from Codroipo and said she was inspired to write poetry in Friulan by the books, Un Friul vivut in Canada (1977) by Ermanno Bulfon and A Furlan Harvest: An Anthology (1993) edited by Dore Michelut, an Italian-Canadian poet.
