= Cipriano (given name) =

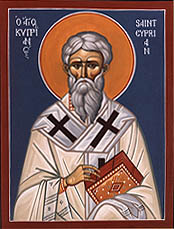
Icon of St. Cyprian of Carthage

Cipriano is a masculine given name. Notable people with the name include:

== First name ==
- Cipriano Branco (born 1985), East Timorese footballer
- Cipriano Cassamá (21st century), Bissau-Guinean politician
- Cipriano Castro (1858–1924), Venezuelan politician
- Cipriano Facchinetti (1889–1952), Italian politician
- Cipriano Ferrandini (1823–1910), Corsican-American hairdresser
- Cipriano Muñoz, 2nd Count of la Viñaza (1862–1933), Spanish diplomat
- Cipriano Efisio Oppo (1891–1962), Italian painter
- Cipriano Pérez y Arias (1784–1823), Costa Rican politician
- Cipriano Piccolpasso (1524–1579), Italian artist
- Cipriano Pons (1890–1985), Argentine fencer
- Cipriano P. Primicias, Sr. (1901–1965), Filipino politician
- Cipriano Rivas Cherif (1891–1967), Spanish playwright
- Cipriano de Rore (c. 1515 – 1565), Franco-Flemish composer
- Cipriano Santos (20th century), Portuguese footballer
- Cipriano Targioni (1672–1748), Italian scientific instrument maker
- Cipriano de Valera (17th century), Spanish Bible translator

== Middle name ==
- Leopoldo da Gama (1843–1929), Goan journalist and writer
- Tomás Cipriano de Mosquera (1798–1878), Colombian general

== See also ==
- Cipriano (surname)
- Cypriano
