= Giuseppe Cipriani =

Giuseppe Cipriani may refer to:

- Giuseppe Cipriani (chef) (1900–1980), founded Harry's Bar in Venice in 1931
- Giuseppe Cipriani (racing driver) (born 1966), Italian racing driver
- Giovanni Battista Cipriani (1727–1785), also called Giuseppe Cipriani, Italian painter and engraver
