= Cypriano =

Cypriano is a surname and a given name. Notable people with the name include:

Given name:

- Cypriano Barbosa Bettâmio (1818–1855), Brazilian medical doctor
- Leandro Henrique Cypriano Catrino de Jesus (born 1987), a.k.a. Nando, Brazilian futsal player
- Peter Bertram Cypriano Castellino de Noronha (1897–1970), Indian businessman and civil servant
- Cypriano Nunes (1892–1980), a.k.a. Castelhano, Brazilian footballer
- Deng Cypriano Rehan, South Sudanese chess player
- Cypriano de Rore (1515–1565), Franco-Flemish Renaissance composer, active in Italy
- Cypriano de Soarez (1524–1593), Spanish Jesuit who wrote the first Jesuit rhetoric textbook
- Cypriano de Valera (1531–1602), Spanish Protestant Reformer and refugee

Surname:

- André Cypriano (born 1964), Brazilian documentary and fine art photographer
- Lucile Cypriano (born 1996), French racing driver

== See also ==
- Cipriano (given name)
- Cipriano (surname)
