= Cipriani =

Cipriani may refer to:

== People ==
- Cipriani (surname), surname

Given name

- Cipriani Phillip (1936–2007), Trinidadian sprinter
- Cipriani Potter (1792–1871), British composer, pianist and educator

== Other ==
- Cipriani S.A., a company with restaurants in Venice and New York City
- Cipriani College of Labour and Cooperative Studies (CCLCS), a public University located in Trinidad, named after Arthur Andrew Cipriani
- Casa Cipriani, a hotel and private membership club in New York City
- Hotel Cipriani, Venetian hotel built by Giuseppe Cipriani
- Toni Cipriani, a fictional character in the Grand Theft Auto video game series
