= Hotel Cipriani =

Building in Venice, Italy

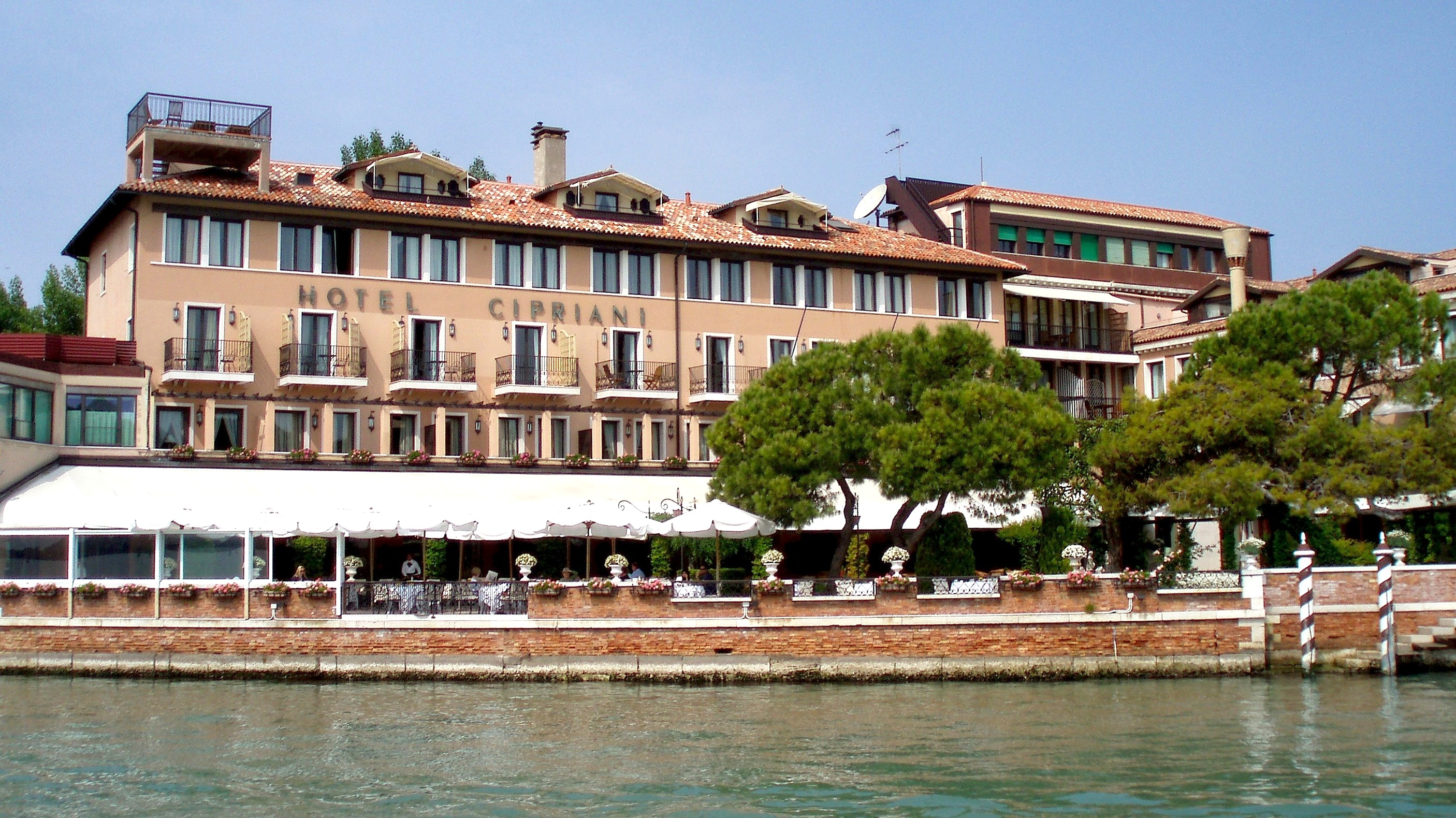
- Interactive map of the Hotel Cipriani area
- Former names: Belmond Hotel Cipriani
- Hotel chain: Belmond

General information
- Location: Giudecca, Venice, Italy
- Coordinates: 45.4261°N 12.3411°E
- Named for: Giuseppe Cipriani
- Opened: 1958

Other information
- Number of rooms: 96

Website
- www.belmond.com/hotels/europe/italy/venice/belmond-hotel-cipriani/

The Hotel Cipriani is a deluxe hotel on the island of Giudecca in Venice, northern Italy. It is reached by hotel launch from St Mark's Square, a five-minute journey across the lagoon. It has long been considered one of the leading luxury hotels in the world, and its room rates start at $1,400 per night.

== History ==
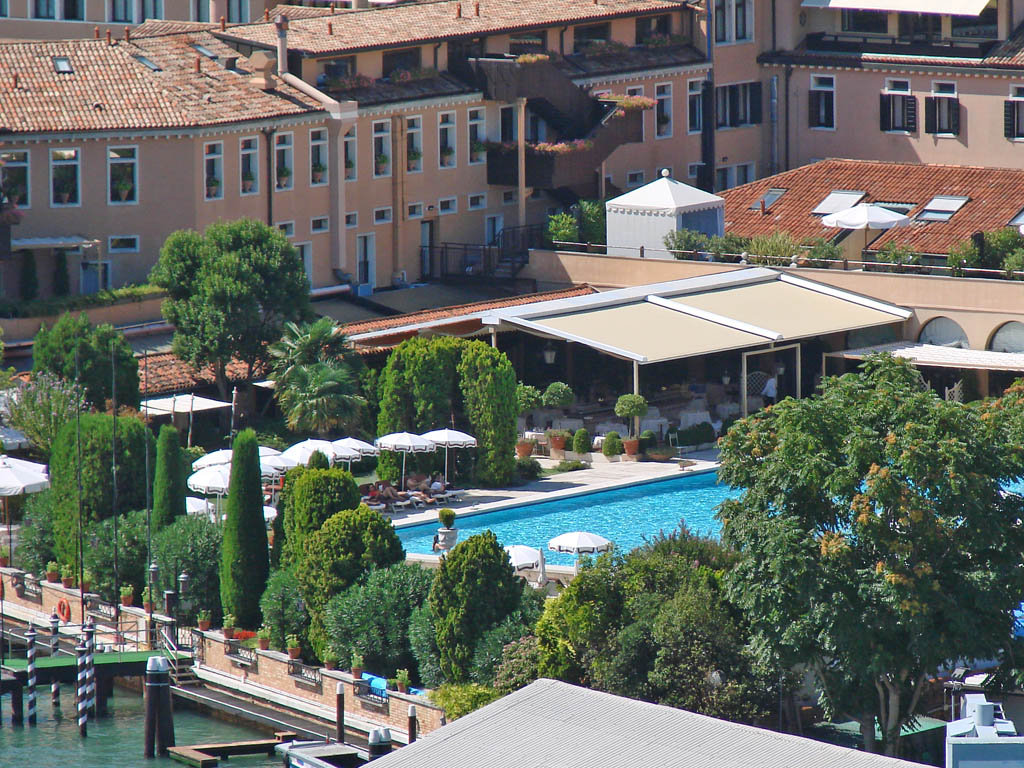
A view of the pool area

The hotel was opened in 1958 by Giuseppe Cipriani, founder of Harry's Bar in Venice and inventor of the Bellini cocktail. As well as Giuseppe Cipriani, the partners in the joint company were the three daughters of the 2nd Earl of Iveagh, who provided the financing. The three sisters—Viscountess Boyd of Merton, Lady Honor Svedar and Lady Brigid Guinness—each had a suite designed for themselves and their families. The rooms were decorated with Venetian furnishings, including Murano glass chandeliers, Fortuny fabrics and Venetian artwork.

The hotel achieved instant acclaim. In 1962, the Earl asked Giuseppe Cipriani to rebuild and manage the Hotel Belvedere on his property in Asolo; this was reopened as the Hotel Villa Cipriani. In 1968, some adjoining land was purchased and a swimming pool (the only pool in central Venice) was added among the gardens.

In 1976 it was purchased for £900,000 (equivalent to £7.15 million in 2024) by Sea Containers, which established a leisure division named Orient-Express Hotels Ltd. The hotel subsequently expanded into the adjacent Palazzo Vendramin, a 15th-century palace facing the lagoon and St Mark's Square. A restaurant, Cip's Club, was built on a floating pontoon in the lagoon. In 1990, the adjacent Granaries of the Republic were opened as an event space.

In 2014, the Hotel Cipriani was renamed the Belmond Hotel Cipriani as part of the rebranding of Orient-Express Hotels as Belmond. In April 2014, the hotel opened Oro Restaurant, designed by Adam Tihany, which was awarded a Michelin star in December 2015. George Clooney got married at the hotel.

Venice is the setting for the second half of the 1992 James Bond novel Death is Forever by John Gardner. Bond flies into the Marco Polo Airport and is picked up by the Hotel's launch service. The Cipriani is located on the island of Giudecca and can only be reached by water. Several scenes take place at the hotel; Bond reserves a junior suite and later dines at the restaurant.

This hotel is part of a plot point for the sixth book in The Sisters Grimm series by Michael Buckley. It is also the setting for the World Chess Championship in Ali Hazelwood's 2023 young adult novel Check & Mate.
