= Gaspero Mazzeranghi =

Italian artisan

Gaspero Mazzeranghi (18th century) was a scientific instrument maker.

A smith with a workshop in Florence in Borgo San Jacopo, Mazzeranghi worked for the Museo di Fisica e Storia Naturale throughout the last quarter of the eighteenth century, principally as an equipment and tool-maker. He also helped to build mechanical, hydraulic, and electrostatic instruments, and - most important of all - balances.

== See also ==
- Bregans lens
