= Figueira, Faro =

Village in Portugal

Coordinates: 37°09′50″N 08°36′07″W

Figueira (Portuguese pronunciation: [fiˈɡɐjɾɐ]) is a village near Portimão in the Algarve in Portugal.

In the English-speaking world its main claim to fame is the disappearance there, on 12 September 2004, of a local girl, eight-year-old Joana Cipriano, and the subsequent conviction of her mother and uncle for murder.
