= Rossini (cocktail) =

Cocktail

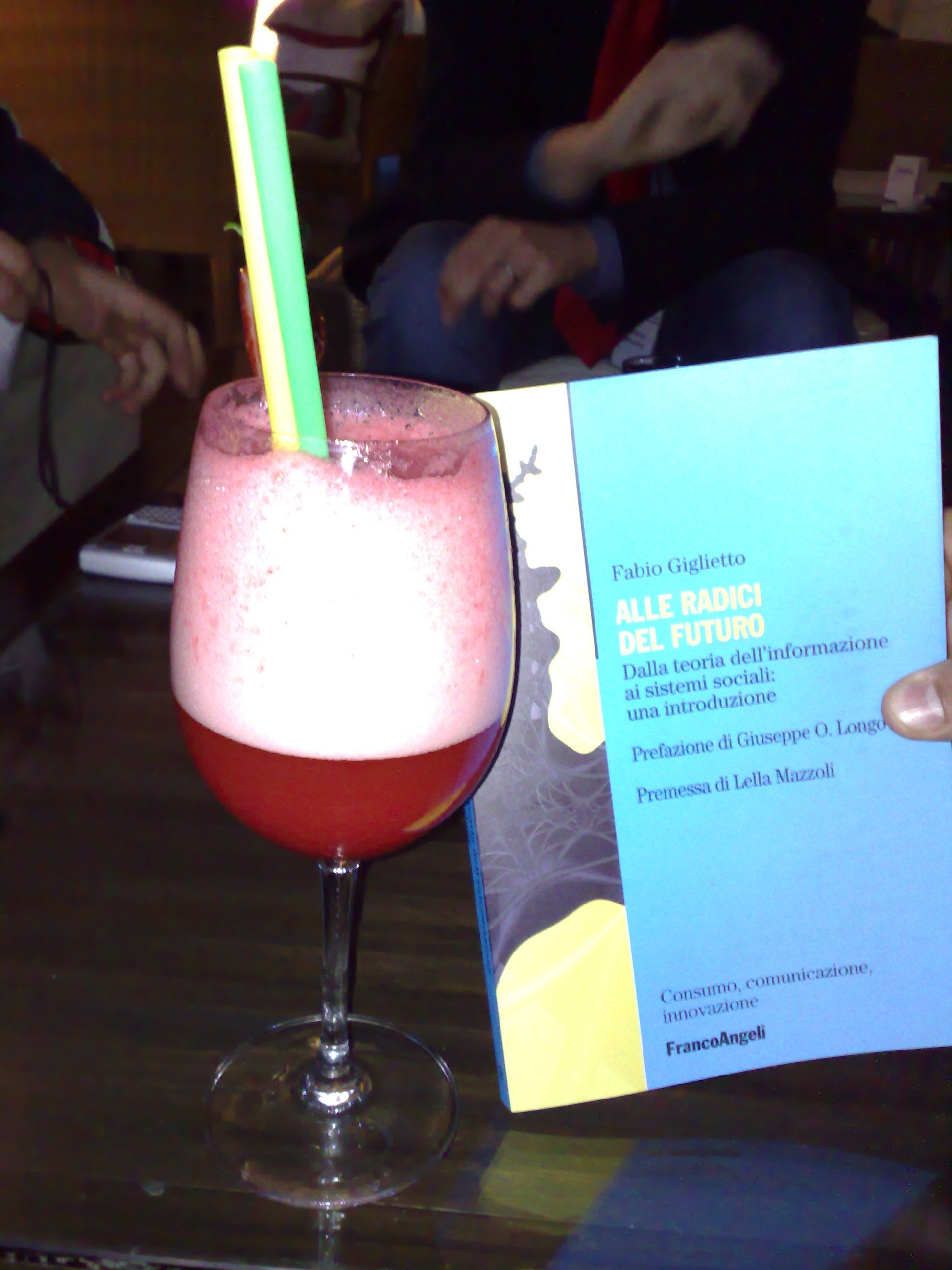

The Rossini is a type of alcoholic mixed drink made with sweet sparkling wine (Prosecco) and puréed strawberries. The cocktail is the most popular alternative to the classic Bellini.

== Origin of the name ==
The drink was named after the 19th century Italian composer Gioachino Rossini.

== Preparation ==
Being a variation of the Bellini cocktail, Rossini is based on the same preparation. Cut two thick slices from one strawberry and reserve. Purée the remaining strawberries and pour into two Champagne flutes. Top up with Prosecco and serve with the strawberry slice on the rim of the glass.

== Variations ==
- Bellini. Peach juice or purée are used instead of strawberry syrup and purée
- Mimosa. Strawberry component is replaced by orange juice
- Tintoretto. Consists of Champagne and pomegranate juice
- Puccini. Similar to the Mimosa, but contains tangerine or mandarin juice

– Source:

== See also ==
- List of cocktails
