= Pietro Zorutti =

Italian poet (1792–1867)

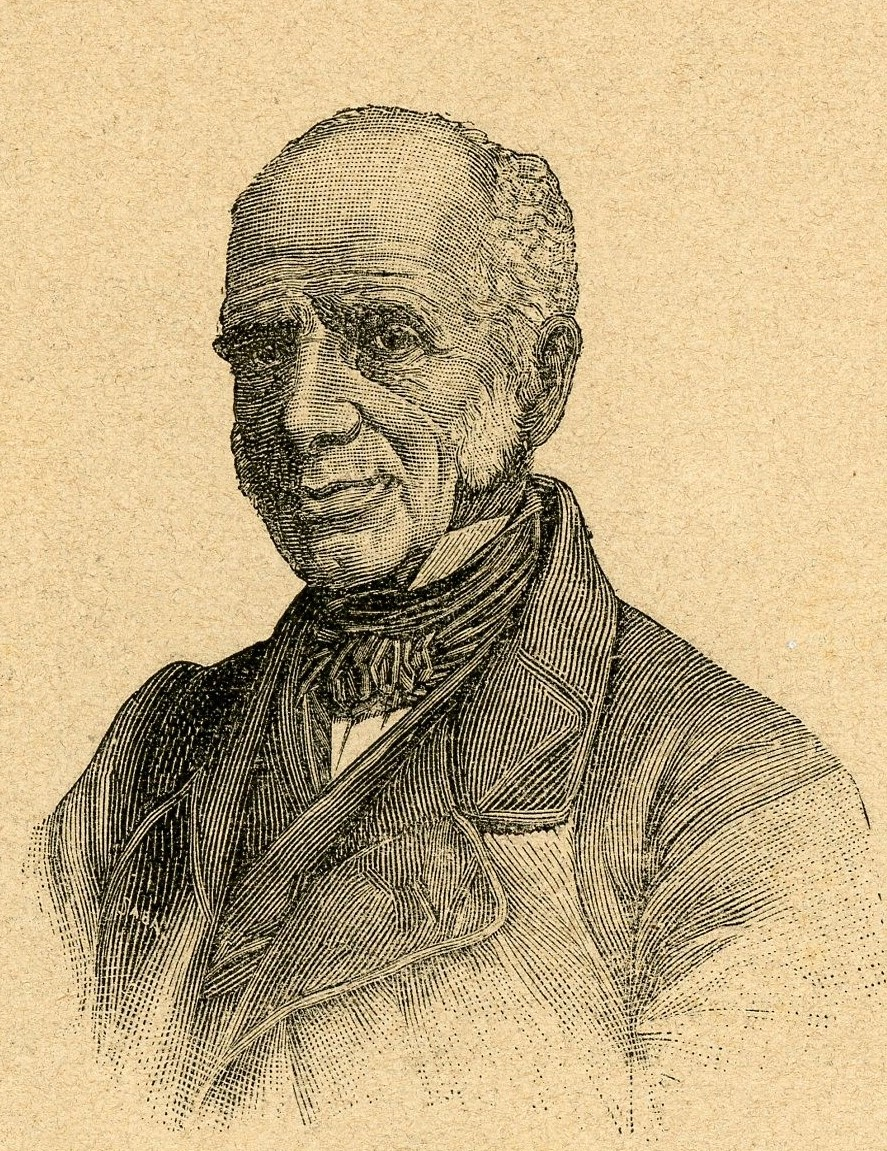
Pietro Zorutti

Pietro Zorutti (Pieri Çorut) (December 27, 1792 - February 23, 1867) was an Italian poet. His fame is mainly due to the publication each year from 1821 to 1867 of Friulian language poetry. Much of his Friulian poetry was based around the middle class dialect of Udine, where he spent much of his life.

His most famous poem is Plovisine. Zorutti was fascinated by the romantic poets, and this earned him praise from writers such as Tommaseo and Carducci, but harsh criticism from other members of the new Friulian poets after World War II, including Pier Paolo Pasolini who regarded him as an old writer and unable to possess poetic character.

His most famous poem remains Plovisine, written in 1831; Zorutti has always been considered the best literary depiction of the life of the Friulian people and for this reason he is one of the best known and most imitated Friulian poets; his compositions started from a pre-romantic setting, because Zorutti was fascinated by the poets of romanticism and this earned him on the one hand the praise of writers such as Tommaseo and Carducci, on the other, the harsh criticism of the exponents of the new Friulian poetry of the second postwar period, including Pier Paolo Pasolini who considered him an old writer incapable of his own poetic character; another criticism that was addressed to him was that of having always considered Friulian a low-level language, good only for small things. He was also criticized by Ugo Pellis for having dedicated a work "Il bon pari", to the Austrian emperor Francesco Giuseppe, who at that time, immediately after the end of the Great War, was considered by the Italian nationalists as a person to be erased from the history of Friuli.

His greatest merit is probably that of having removed from the fields the language used by Ermes di Colloredo and of having made the Friulian language more literary.
