= Ciro di Pers =

Italian Baroque poet (1599–1663)

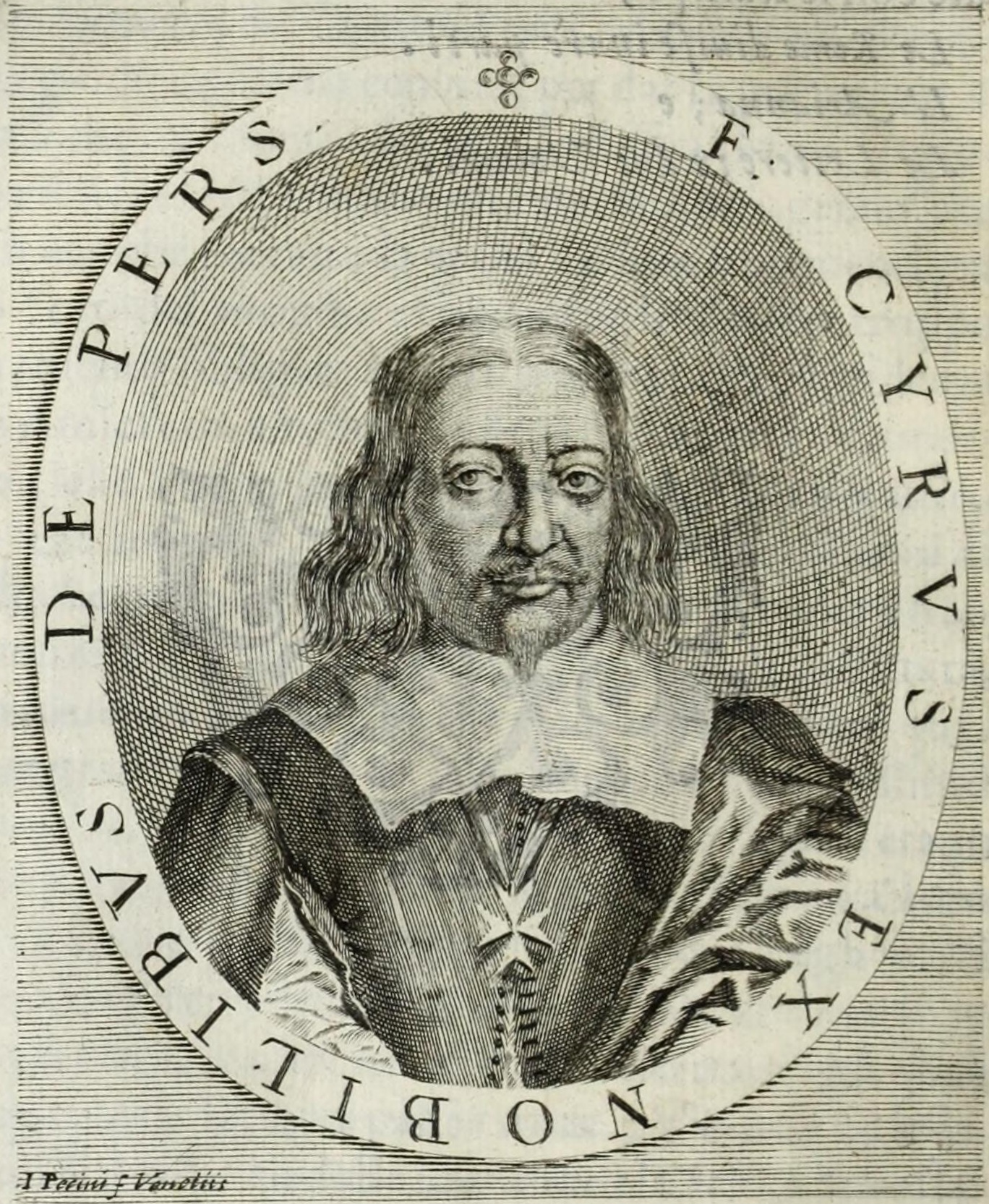
- Portrait of Ciro di Pers. From the book "Le glorie degli Incogniti", 1647
- Born: 17 April 1599; Pers, Udine, Republic of Venice
- Died: 7 April 1663 (aged 63); Pers, Udine, Republic of Venice
- Education: University of Bologna
- Occupations: Poet; Intellectual; Soldier
- Writing career
- Parent(s): Giulio Antonio di Pers and Ginevra di Pers (née Colloredo)
- Language: Latin; Italian
- Period: 17th century; Baroque literature
- Genres: Poetry; drama
- Literary movement: Baroque; Marinism

Ciro di Pers (Italian: [ˈtʃiːro di pers]; 17 April 1599 – 7 April 1663) was an Italian Baroque poet and man of letters.

== Life ==
Ciro di Pers was born in the castle of Pers, San Daniele del Friuli, near Udine. He was the only son of Giulio Antonio and Ginevra Colloredo. He received his early education in Gemona, under the guidance of the well-known humanist Iginio di Maniago.

Between 1613 and 1618 he lived in Bologna, where he studied philosophy and theology and became a friend of two of the most famous poets of his time, Claudio Achillini and Girolamo Preti. When his father died, he returned to Pers. In May 1627, after an unhappy love affair with his young cousin Taddea Colloredo (the ‘Nicea’ to whom much of his verse is addressed) he enrolled in the Order of the Knights of Malta. Before embarking for the island, he visited Venice where he befriended Pietro Michiel, a member of the Accademia degli Incogniti. Stopping in Florence, he was introduced at court to Prince Leopoldo de' Medici. Pers arrived in Malta on 4 May 1627. That same year he participated in a military naval expedition against Ottoman Turkish forces. He stayed in Malta until the end of 1629, when he obtained permission to return to Pers.

After the death of his mother (1633), he resettled permanently in San Daniele del Friuli, where he chose to live a life of relative seclusion and study, gaining a reputation for dignity and probity of character. He maintained continual correspondence with several Italian writers and scholars of the period and made occasional visits to Padua and Venice, where he became a member of the Accademia degli Incogniti and befriended Giovanni Francesco Loredan and Carlo de' Dottori. In 1650 he went on a pilgrimage to Loreto, and between 1655 and 1657 he lived in Rome. In later life, Pers suffered from severe attacks of kidney stones. He died in his family castle on 7 April 1663, aged 63.

== Works ==
Ciro di Pers left a fascinating and complex corpus of poems, which was largely published posthumously. The first collection of his poetry appeared in Florence in 1666. Within the space of twenty-three years, the collection enjoyed wide circulation with almost twenty separate printings in major cities on the peninsula . A second edition of the poetry was published in Venice 1689. Ciro di Pers wrote also a tragedy "L'umiltà esaltata, ovvero Ester regina", written around 1659 and published in Bassano in 1664.

Pers is widely considered one of the foremost Italian lyric poets of the Baroque period. The Oxford Companion to Italian Literature dubbed him “one of the most interesting of the Baroque poets”. His literary output includes more than three hundred and fifty poems, mostly sonnets, on a wide variety of subjects. Pers combines two of the main trends of the Italian Seicento. Many occasional sonnets are descriptive vignettes in characteristic Marinist vein, enlivened by audacious imagery, dramatic adjectives, and neatly rounded conclusion. Other poems on social and political themes are reminiscent of the manner of Fulvio Testi. In them he attacks the decadence and flabbiness of contemporary society, laments the calamities which have befallen Italy, and points to the frailty of human life. Ciro di Pers is obsessed with an acute sense of suffering about time, which rapidly escapes and devours human life and its artifacts. His poetry is permeated by a strong sense of the transience of life and the uncertainty of the human condition.

== See also ==
- Ermes di Colorêt

== Bibliography ==
- «Ciro de' signori di Pers». In : Le glorie de gli Incogniti: o vero, Gli huomini illustri dell'Accademia de' signori Incogniti di Venetia, In Venetia : appresso Francesco Valuasense stampator dell'Accademia, 1647, pp. 104–107 (on-line).
- Croce, Benedetto (1910). Lirici marinisti. Bari: Laterza. pp. 363–406.
- Getto, Giovanni, ed. (1954). Opere Scelte di Giovan Battista Marino e dei Marinisti. Vol. II. Turin: U.T.E.T. pp. 499–528.
- Bonito, Vitaniello (1988). "Il nodo dell'antitesi: da Góngora a Ciro di Pers". Lingua e Stile. 23 (3): 427–444.
- Bonito, Vitaniello (1990). "Visione del tempo e tempo della morte in un poeta barocco". Intersezioni. X: 239–260.
- Paolini, Paolo (1986). "La poesia lirica di Ciro di Pers". Italianistica: Rivista di letteratura italiana. 15 (2/3): 239–266. JSTOR 23928133.
- Pelosi, Olimpia (1995). "Ellipse and the Circle: An Analysis of Ciro di Pers between «Anima in Barocco» and Neoplatonism". In Aldo Scaglione; Gianni Eugenio Viola (eds.). The image of the Baroque. New York: P. Lang. pp. 93–107.
- Carpanè, Lorenzo (1999). "Nuove acquisizioni su Ciro di Pers". Rivista di letteratura italiana. XVII: 100–150.
- Ritrovato, Salvatore (2011). "Pers (di) Ciro". In Cesare Scalon; Claudio Griggio; Ugo Rozzo (eds.). Dizionario biografico dei friulani. Nuovo Liruti online (in Italian). Vol. 2. L’età veneta. Istituto Pio Paschini per la storia della Chiesa in Friuli.
- Slawinski, M. (2002). "Ciro Di Pers". The Oxford Companion to Italian Literature. Oxford University Press.
- Colella, Massimo (2019). "Separatezza e conversazione. Sondaggi intertestuali attorno a Ciro di Pers". Xenia. Trimestrale di Letteratura e Cultura. IV (1): 11–37.
