= Cipriano Pérez y Arias =

Costa Rican politician

Cipriano Pérez y Arias (1784–1823) was a Costa Rican politician.

== Personal information ==
He was baptized in Heredia, Costa Rica, on 8 December 1784. His parents were Matías Pérez Viera and Feliciana Arias and Ugalde. On 30 April 1804 he married Juana de Jesús Reyes and Bludgeons, daughter of Pablo José Reyes y Jiménez and Ramona Engracia Porras and González of León.

== Career ==
In October 1821 the mayoralty of the town of Heredia designated him as its representative in the Meeting of Legatees of the Mayoralties, who met in Carthage on 25-26 October 1821 to discuss the independence of Costa Rica from Spain. He was present on 29 October 1821 at the meeting of the Mayoralty of Carthage he signed the Record of Independence of Costa Rica.

== Death ==
He died in Rivas, Nicaragua in February 1823.
