= André Cypriano =

Andre Cypriano
- Born: Andre Augusto Cypriano; May 14, 1964 (age 62); Piracicaba, São Paulo, Brazil
- Known for: Documentary Photographer, Fine Art Photography
- Notable work: 4 photo books
- Website: http://www.andrecypriano.com

André Cypriano (born in Piracicaba, São Paulo, Brazil on May 14, 1964) is a documentary and fine art photographer, known for his photography of traditional lifestyles and practices of lesser known societies in remote corners of the world.

== Biography ==
André Cypriano graduated with a Bachelor of Business Administration at Centro Universitário das Faculdades Metropolitanas Unidas in São Paulo, Brazil. Concerned with environmental issues, he contributed time and effort as the administrator of "Salva Mar" Save the Sea - a Brazilian organization dedicated to save the whales in North Brazil.

In 1990, one year after relocating to the United States, André began to study photography at City College of San Francisco. He has since completed several projects which have been exhibited in several galleries and museums in South America, North America and Europe.

André has been a recipient of the first place award in San Francisco City College's Photography Department of Scholarship (July 1992), the World Image Award Competition promoted by Photo District News in N.Y. (Dec. 1992), New Works Awards - promoted by En Foco in N.Y. (July 1998)., Mother Jones International Fund for Documentary Photography (Sep.1999), Bolsa Vitae de Artes in São Paulo (Jan. 2002), Caracas Think Tank (Jan. 2003), as well as All Roads Photography Program from National Geographic Society (Oct. 2005)

As part of a long term project, Cypriano began to document traditional lifestyles and practices of lesser known societies in remote corners of the world with a slant toward the unique and unusual. Thus far, he has photographed the people of Nias, an island off the northwest coast of Sumatra (Nias - Jumping Stones), the dogs of Bali (Spiritual Quest), the infamous penitentiary of Candido Mendes, in Rio de Janeiro (The Devil's Caldron – book published by Cosac & Naify), the largest shanty town in Brazil, Rio de Janeiro (Rocinha – book published by SENAC Editoras), the 10 most important shantytowns of Rio de Janeiro. The shantytowns of Caracas (The Culture of the Informal Cities – book published by CaracasThinkTank), as well as the culture of resistance of the Quilombolas people (Quilombolas – book published by Aori Produções). In 2010, André Cypriano participated in Cultures of Resistance, a documentary film directed by Iara Lee. A 20-year retrospective of his work was exhibited at Frederico Sève Gallery / latincollector in 2012. His ongoing projects have also been used in educational workshops.

Currently, André Cypriano lives and works in New York City and Rio de Janeiro, and continues to be involved in social and cultural activities.

== Books ==
- O Caldeirão do Diabo (The Devi's Caldron) - photography and text by André Cypriano, published by Cosac & Naify Edições, 2001. ISBN 85-7503-053-1
- Rocinha - photography and text by André Cypriano, published by Editora SENAC, 2005. ISBN 85-7359-431-4
- Quilombolas: Tradição e Cultura da Resistência - photography by André Cypriano, text by Rafael Sanzio dos Anjos, published by AORI, 2006. ISBN 978-85-999-5301-3
- Capoeira: Luta, Dança e Jogo da Liberdade - photography by André Cypriano, text by Rodrigo de Almeida and Letícia Pimenta, published by AORI, 2009. ISBN 978-85-99953-04-4

== Catalogues ==
- 2012 - Two Decades, Frederico Seve Gallery
- 2011 - Afro-Colombianos, Galeria Portfolio
- 2011 - FotoRio 2011, Centro Cultural Correios
- 2010 - Capoeira: Luta, Dança e Jogo da Liberdade, Caixa Cultural
- 2008 - Rocinha, Museu de Arte de São Paulo Coleção Pirelli
- 2007 - Sutil Violento, Itau Cultural
- 2002 - Favelas Upgrading - 8. Mostra Internazionale D'Architettura, Fundação Bienal de São Paulo
- 2002 - Rocinha, Pinacoteca do Estado de São Paulo
- 2001 - Transfigurações - O Rio no Olhar Contemporâneo, Centro Cultural Light

== Awards ==
- 2007 - Coleção Pirelli/MASP de Fotografia - São Paulo, SP - Brazil
- 2007 - Clube da Fotografia do MAM - São Paulo, SP - Brazil
- 2005 - National Geographic, All Roads Photography Program - Washington, D.C. - USA
- 2003 - Caracas Case Project, Federal Cultural Foundation of Germany and Caracas Think Tank - Caracas, CCS - Venezuela
- 2002 - Bolsa Vitae de Artes - São Paulo, SP - Brazil
- 1999 - Mother Jones International Fund for Documentary Photography - San Francisco, CA - USA
- 1998 - En Foco, New Works Award - New York, NY - USA
- 1996 - Lifetouch, Portrait Excellence Award - Burlingame, CA - USA
- 1992 - PDN, World Image Awards - New York, NY - USA
- 1992 - San Francisco City College, Photography Department of Scholarship - San Francisco, CA - USA
