= Carpaccio =

Thin pieces of fish or meat, served raw as an appetiser

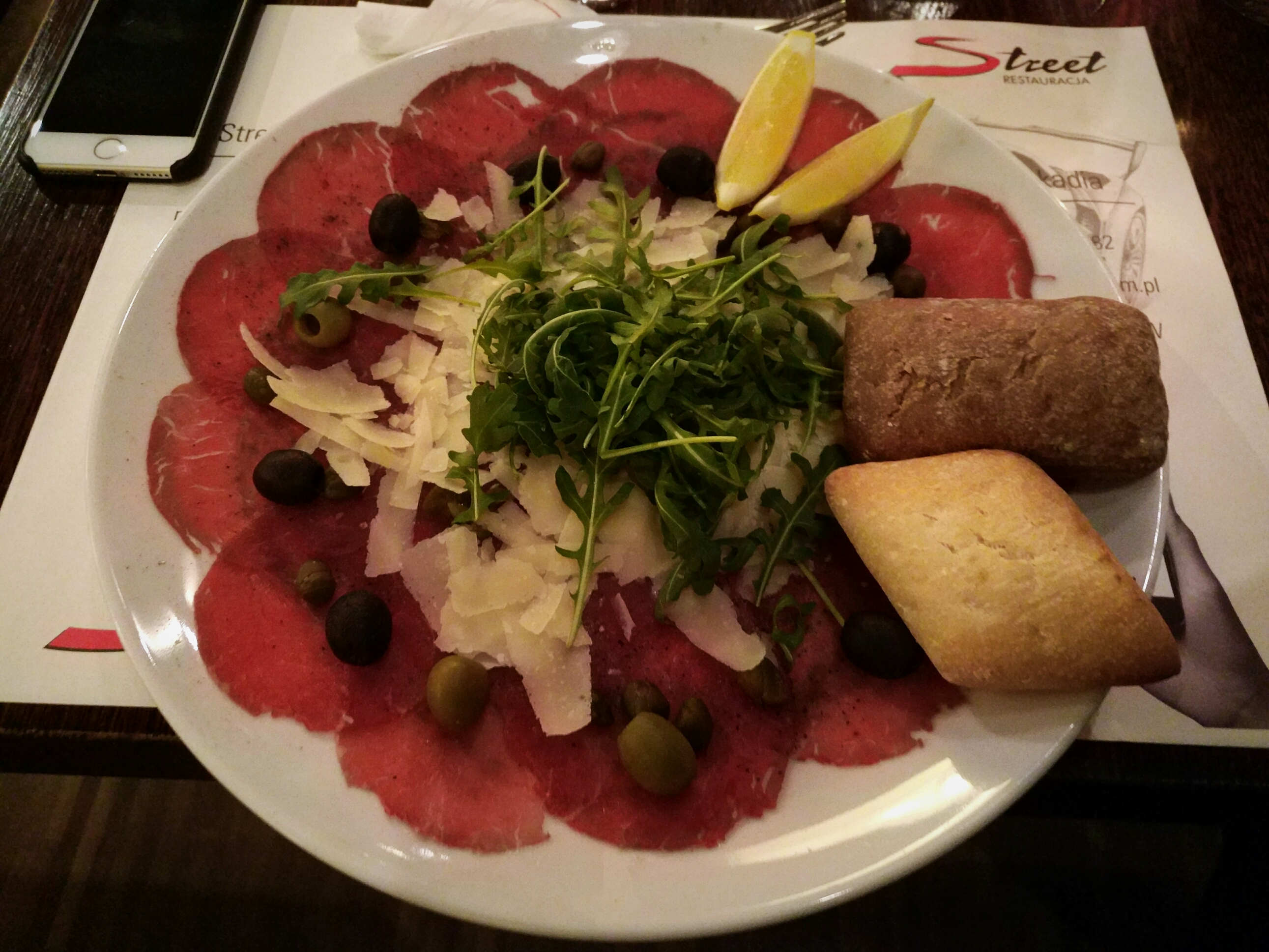
- Carpaccio of raw meat topped with cheese, olives and greens (Warsaw, 2017)
- Course: Antipasto
- Place of origin: Italy
- Main ingredients: Raw meat or fish, beef, horse, veal, venison

Carpaccio (Note: UK: /kɑːrˈpætʃ(i)oʊ/ kar-PATCH-(ee-)oh, US: /-ˈpɑːtʃ-/ kar-PAHCH-; Italian: [karˈpattʃo].) is a dish of meat or fish (such as beef, veal, venison, salmon or tuna), thinly sliced or pounded thin, and served raw, typically as an appetiser. It was invented in 1950 by Giuseppe Cipriani, founder of Harry's Bar in Venice, Italy, and popularised during the second half of the twentieth century. The beef was served with lemon, olive oil and white truffle or Parmesan cheese. Later, the term was extended to dishes containing other raw meats or fish, thinly sliced and served with lemon or vinegar, olive oil, salt and ground pepper.

== History ==
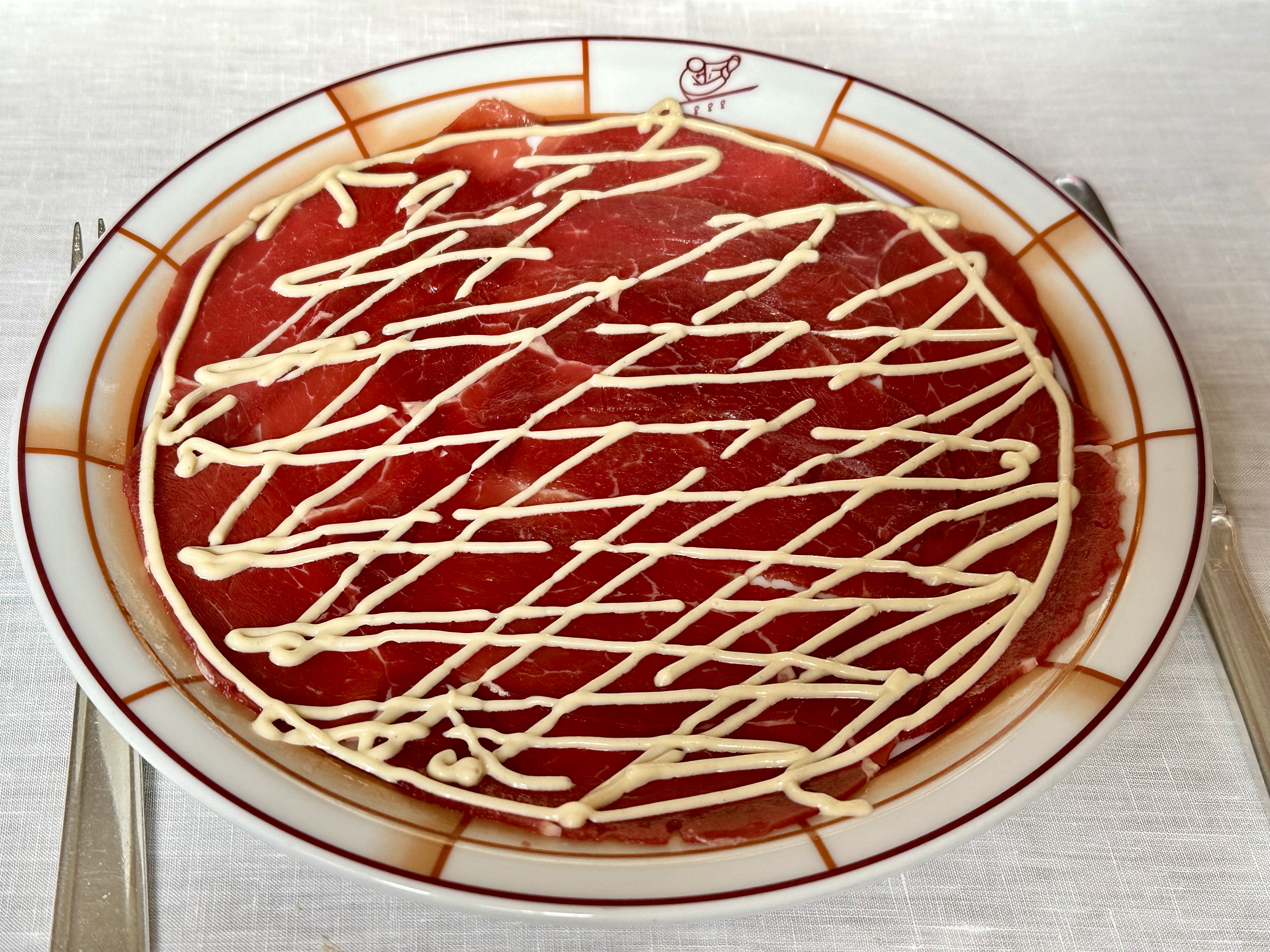
Carpaccio Cipriani, thin slices of raw beef drizzled in mayonnaise, served at Harry's Bar (Venice, 2024)

The dish, based on the Piedmont speciality carne cruda alla piemontese, was invented in 1950 by Cipriani, who originally prepared the dish for countess Amalia Nani Mocenigo when he learned that her doctors had recommended that she eat raw meat. The dish was named carpaccio after Vittore Carpaccio, the Venetian painter known for the characteristic red and white tones of his work. Cipriani was reportedly inspired by Carpaccio's red-and-white paintings because of the major exhibit of the artist's work that took place in the Doge's Palace at the time.

== See also ==
- List of fish dishes
- Sashimi
- Tataki
