= Luciano Cipriani =

Argentine footballer

Luciano Cipriani (born 8 March 1981 in Córdoba, Argentina) is an Argentine former professional footballer who played as a forward.

== Clubs ==
- Belgrano de Córdoba 2002–2003
- Central Norte 2004–2005
- Luján de Cuyo 2005–2006
- Independiente Rivadavia 2006–2007
- Nocerina 2007
- Gimnasia y Esgrima de Mendoza 2008
- Defensores de Belgrano 2008–2009
- Santiago Wanderers 2009
- Deportivo Merlo 2010
- Sarmiento de Junín 2010
- Estudiantes de Buenos Aires 2011
