= Murder of Joana Cipriano =

2004 murder in Algarve, Portugal

Joana Cipriano
- Born: Joana Isabel Cipriano Guerreiro; 31 May 1996
- Disappeared: 12 August 2004 (aged 8) but known to have been murdered Figueira, Algarve, Portugal
- Status: Missing for 21 years, 9 months and 25 days
- Parent: Leonor Cipriano (mother)
- Investigating force: Polícia Judiciária, Portimão
- Charge: Murder
- Convicted: Leonor Cipriano (mother), João Cipriano (maternal uncle)

Joana Isabel Cipriano Guerreiro (born 31 May 1996) was a Portuguese child who disappeared on 12 August 2004 from Figueira, a village near Portimão in Portugal's Algarve region. An investigation by the Polícia Judiciária (PJ), Portugal's criminal police, concluded that she had been murdered by her mother, Leonor Cipriano, and her uncle, João Cipriano, after witnessing them engaged in incestuous sex. Joana's body was never found; there is no tangible evidence she is dead.

Joana's mother and uncle confessed to police in October 2004; her uncle said he had cut the girl's body into pieces before disposing of it by throwing it into a nearby pigsty. Her mother withdrew her confession the day after signing it, alleging that she had been beaten during a 48-hour-long interrogation. Police officers accounted for the bruising on the mother's face and body by maintaining that she had thrown herself down some stairs in the police station in an effort to commit suicide. Both the mother and uncle were convicted of murder and sentenced to sixteen years in jail. It was the first murder trial in Portuguese legal history to take place without the discovery of a body.

Five officers were charged with a variety of offences as a result of the allegations of assault; three were acquitted. One of the two officers who was convicted, Chief Inspector Gonçalo Amaral, led the investigation into the disappearance of Madeleine McCann, a British girl who went missing in May 2007 from the nearby resort town of Praia da Luz. Amaral was not present during the alleged assault, but was accused of having covered up for other officers; he was convicted of having falsified police documents in the case and received an eighteen-month suspended sentence.

Several similarities between the Cipriano and McCann cases—both girls vanished without trace within eleven kilometers (seven miles) and three years of each other, both cases had officers who failed to secure the crime scene, both mothers mounted campaigns to find their daughters, and both women were accused of involvement—prompted Cipriano's family to appeal in 2008 for police to investigate whether there was a link between the disappearances.

== Disappearance and charges ==
Joana Cipriano, aged eight, was last seen at around 8:00 pm on 12 August 2004 after being sent to buy milk and a tin of tuna from a local store. A neighbour saw her around 200 meters from her house, returning from the store. Her mother, Leonor Cipriano, launched a local campaign to find her, distributing posters around the neighbourhood.

The prosecution argued that Joana was murdered because she had seen her mother and her uncle, João Cipriano, having sex. Leonor confessed to killing her daughter after nearly 48 hours of continuous interrogation; João confessed to having assaulted Joana, and said he had cut her body into small pieces and placed them inside a refrigerator before disposing of them by throwing them into a nearby pigsty. When asked if he had sexually abused Joana, he said, "I did not harm her— I only killed her."

In 2019, Leonor was released from prison after serving five-sixths of her sentence.

== Controversy ==
=== Allegations of police misconduct ===
Leonor retracted her confession the day after making it, claiming she had been beaten during her interrogation. She suffered extensive bruising to her face and body, which the police said was caused by her throwing herself down a stairwell in the police station in an effort to kill herself. Five officers, including Gonçalo Amaral, head of the regional Polícia Judiciária (PJ) in Portimão at the time, were charged with a number of offences. The indictment alleged that several of them had kicked Leonor, hit her with a cardboard tube, put a plastic bag over her head, and made her kneel on glass ashtrays.

Three officers–Leonel Marques, Paulo Pereira Cristóvão and Paulo Marques Bom–were acquitted of torture. Amaral was not present at the time of the alleged beating but was accused of having covered up for the other officers, which he denied. He was convicted of perjury in May 2009 for having falsified documents in the case, and received an eighteen-month suspended sentence. Another officer, António Nunes Cardoso, was also found guilty of having falsified documents and received a 2 1/2-year suspended sentence.

=== Comparison to McCann case ===
The village of Figueira is only eleven kilometers from Praia da Luz, where Madeleine McCann disappeared on 3 May 2007. In both cases the mothers launched campaigns to find their daughters, and in both cases the local PJ investigated the possibility that the mothers had killed their daughters.

A child-protection specialist, Mark Williams-Thomas, who believes that Joana's and Madeleine's disappearances are related, said that the disappearance of two children unknown to each other within a seven-mile radius over a period of three years would be a huge coincidence, especially considering that Portugal is a small country with few abductions. Before Joana's disappearance, the previous first-degree murder of a child in the Algarve region was in November 1990 and involved a British girl, nine-year-old Rachel Charles, who was abducted and murdered in Albufeira. Her body was found three days later; a British mechanic and friend of the family, Michael Cook, was arrested and convicted. Leandro Silva, Leonor's common-law husband, said in 2007 that "the only difference between the McCanns and us is that we don't have money."

== See also ==
- Crime in Portugal
- List of murder convictions without a body
- List of solved missing person cases: 1950–1999
