= Harry's Bar (Venice) =

Restaurant in Venice, Italy

Coordinates: 45°25′57″N 12°20′14″E

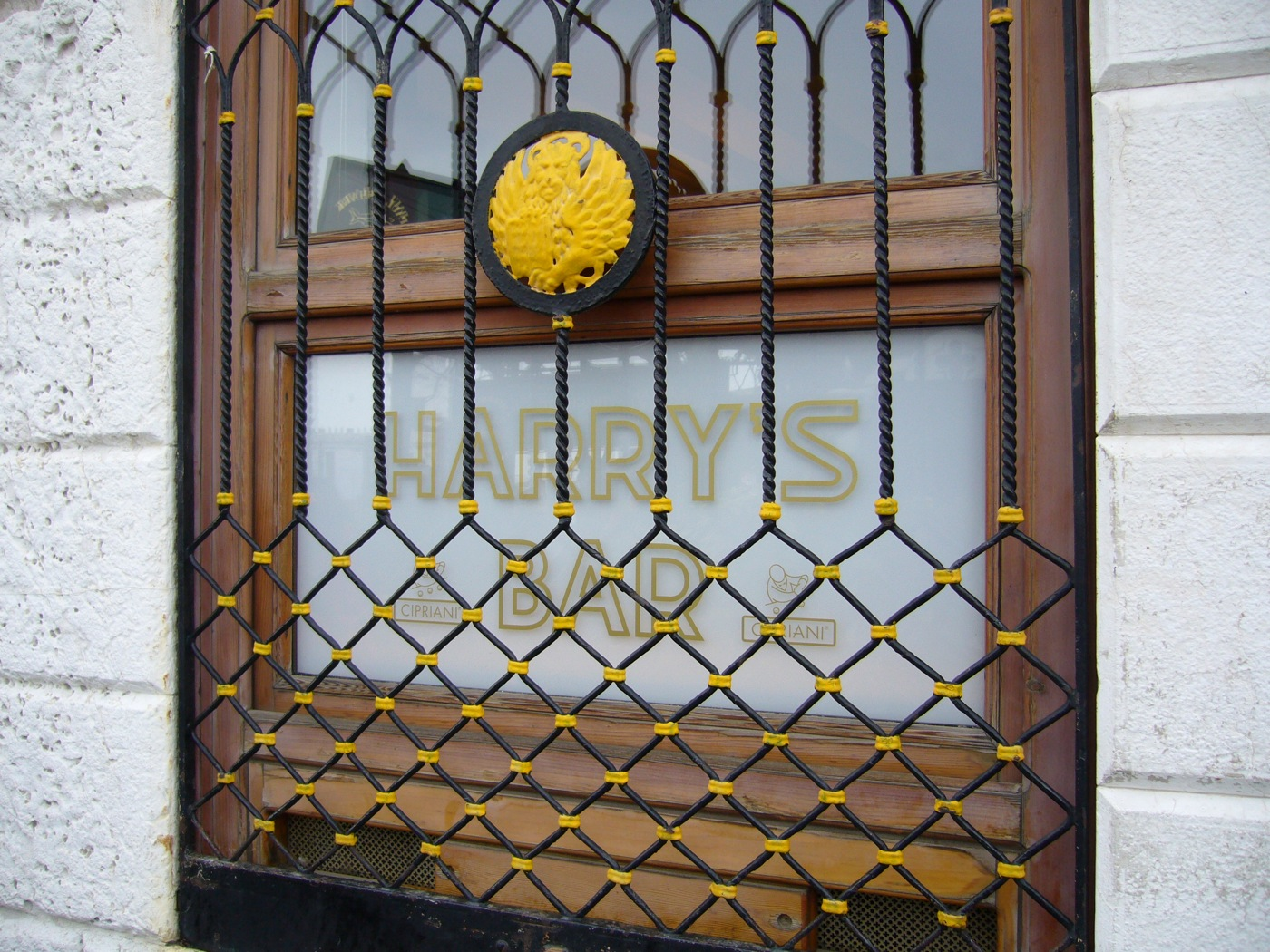
Sign for Harry's Bar

Harry's Bar is a restaurant located at Calle Vallaresso 1323, Venice, Italy, owned by Cipriani S.A.

== History ==
Harry's Bar was opened in 1931 by Giuseppe Cipriani. According to the company's history, Harry Pickering, a rich young American, had been frequenting the Hotel Europa in Venice, where Cipriani was a bartender. When Pickering suddenly stopped coming to the hotel bar, Cipriani asked him why. Pickering explained that he was broke because his family found out his drinking habits and cut him off financially, and Cipriani lent him 10,000 lire (then about $500 US [$7,839 in 2015 dollars]). Two years later, Pickering returned to the hotel bar, ordered a drink, and gave Cipriani 50,000 lire in return. "Mr. Cipriani, thank you", he said, according to the Cipriani website. "Here's the money. And to show you my appreciation, here's 40,000 more, enough to open a bar. We will call it Harry's Bar."

The Italian Ministry for Cultural Affairs declared it a national landmark in 2001.

== Patrons ==
Harry's Bar has long been frequented by famous people, and it was a favourite of Ernest Hemingway. Other notable customers have included Italian conductor Arturo Toscanini, inventor Guglielmo Marconi, Charlie Chaplin, Alfred Hitchcock, Jimmy Stewart, Maria Callas, Richard Halliburton, Truman Capote, Orson Welles, Baron Philippe de Rothschild, Giuseppe Sinopoli, Princess Aspasia of Greece, Aristotle Onassis, Barbara Hutton, Peggy Guggenheim, Tareq Salahi, George Clooney, Joe DiMaggio, and Woody Allen.

The original Harry's in Venice was extensively featured in Hemingway's 1950 novel, Across the River and into the Trees.

The bar was also briefly mentioned in the second and subsequent editions of Evelyn Waugh's novel Brideshead Revisited (in the first edition Waugh simply called the bar "the English bar") as a frequent haunt of principal characters Charles Ryder and Lord Sebastian Flyte during their time in Venice. The mention is anachronistic as their visit takes place in 1923.

== Food and drink ==
Harry's Bar is home of the Bellini and Carpaccio.

Harry's Bar is also famous for its dry martini, which is served in a small glass without a stem. Their dry martinis are very dry, apparently with the ratio of 10 parts gin to 1 part vermouth. This is an adaptation of the Montgomery Martini, which is 15 parts gin to 1 part dry vermouth. The Montgomery is named after British Field Marshal Bernard Montgomery, who liked to have a 15 to 1 ratio of his own troops against enemy troops on the battlefield.

Harry's Bar serves classic Italian dishes. Its prices are relatively high (40,000 lire (€20) for a bowl of minestrone, in 2001).

== Expansion ==
Harry's Bar is today "the anchor to a global brand, positioned around the Cipriani name." In New York City, the Ciprianis run the restaurants Harry Cipriani, Cipriani 42nd Street, and DownTown, a travel company, and a catering company. Buenos Aires is home to three more outlets. In Venice, the Ciprianis also own Harry's Dolci. The Cipriani brand also includes lines of pastas, sauces, olive oils, coffee, books, and kitchenware.

In 2007, the Ciprianis pleaded guilty to tax evasion in the United States. In 2012, with debts of over €6m, the bar was sold to Luxembourg-based investment group Blue Skye.

== Reception ==
Anthony Bourdain said of Harry's, "You get a pretty good plate of food—and the Bellinis are just fine. They just cost a fuck of a lot. But they do treat you courteously and it is Venice out the window—and everything's expensive anyway."

== See also ==
- Harry's Bar (Rome)
- Harry's Bar (London), named after the Venetian establishment
- Harry's New York Bar, in Paris, founded and run by different owner.
