= Francesco Spighi =

Francesco Spighi (18th century) was a Florentine artisan active in the late eighteenth century.

All we know about him is that he worked for some time as craftsman and cabinet-maker for the Museo di Fisica e Storia Naturale of Florence, producing inlaid-wood furniture and apparatuses for the Physics Cabinet. He was also a part of a revival in piano making in late eighteenth-century Italy, along with revival of piano making in late eighteenth-century Italy by such makers as Giuseppe Zannetti, Vicenzio Sodi, Luigi Vignoli, and Errico Gustadt.

== See also ==
- Bregans lens
