= Harry's Bar (Rome) =

Bar in Italy

Coordinates: 41°54′33.14″N 12°29′17.8″E

Harry's Bar Rome
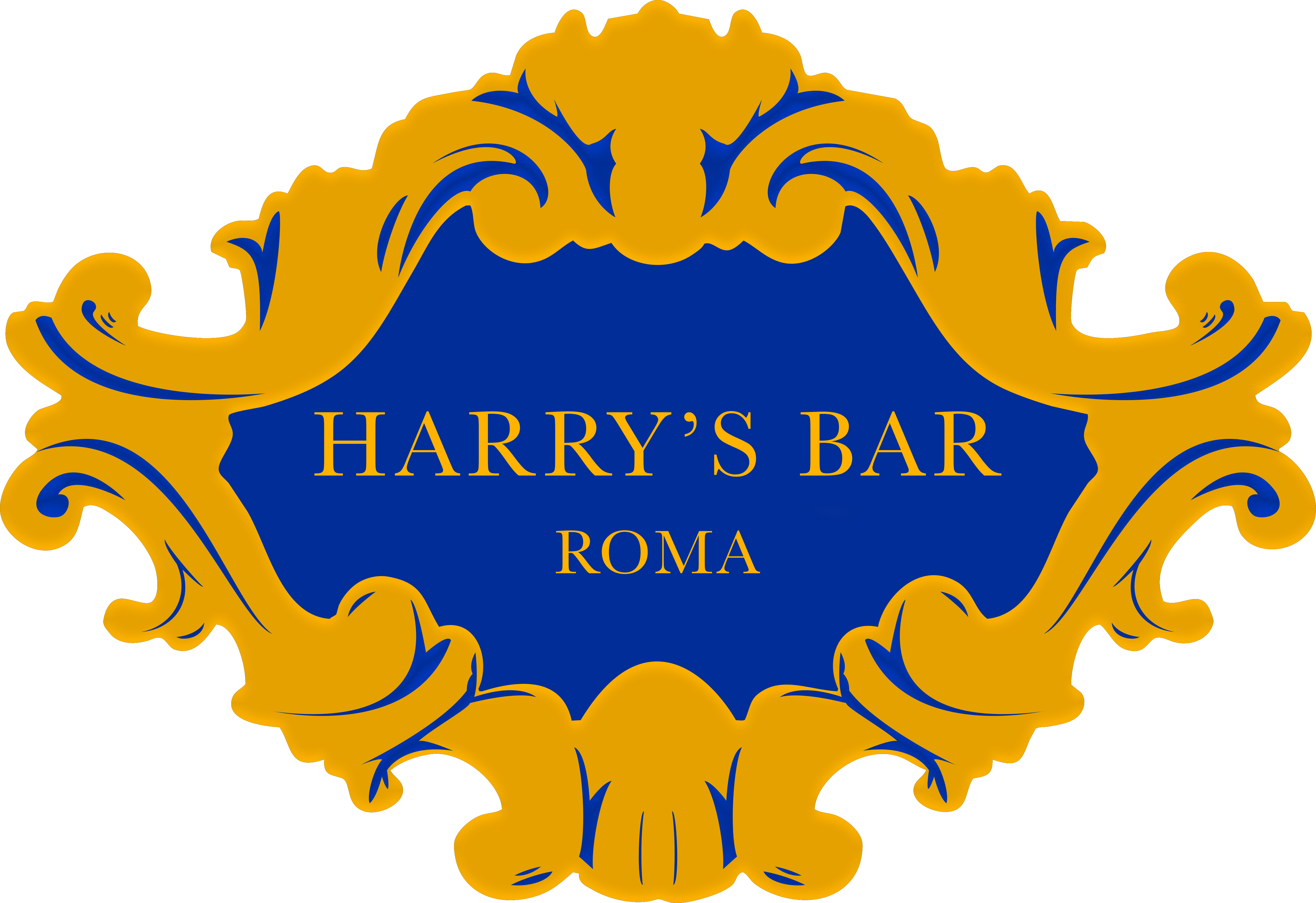
- Industry: Restaurants
- Founded: 1918 in Rome
- Headquarters: Via Vittorio Veneto 150 - Rome
- Key people: Pietro Lepore
- Website: harrysbar.it

Harry's Bar Rome is a historic bar and restaurant located on the Via Veneto in Rome, Italy. It gained international fame when it was featured in La Dolce Vita, a film by Federico Fellini.

Today, it operates as a bar and restaurant and attracts an upscale Roman and international crowd.

It is not related to Harry's Bars in Venice, Florence, Paris or London.

== History ==
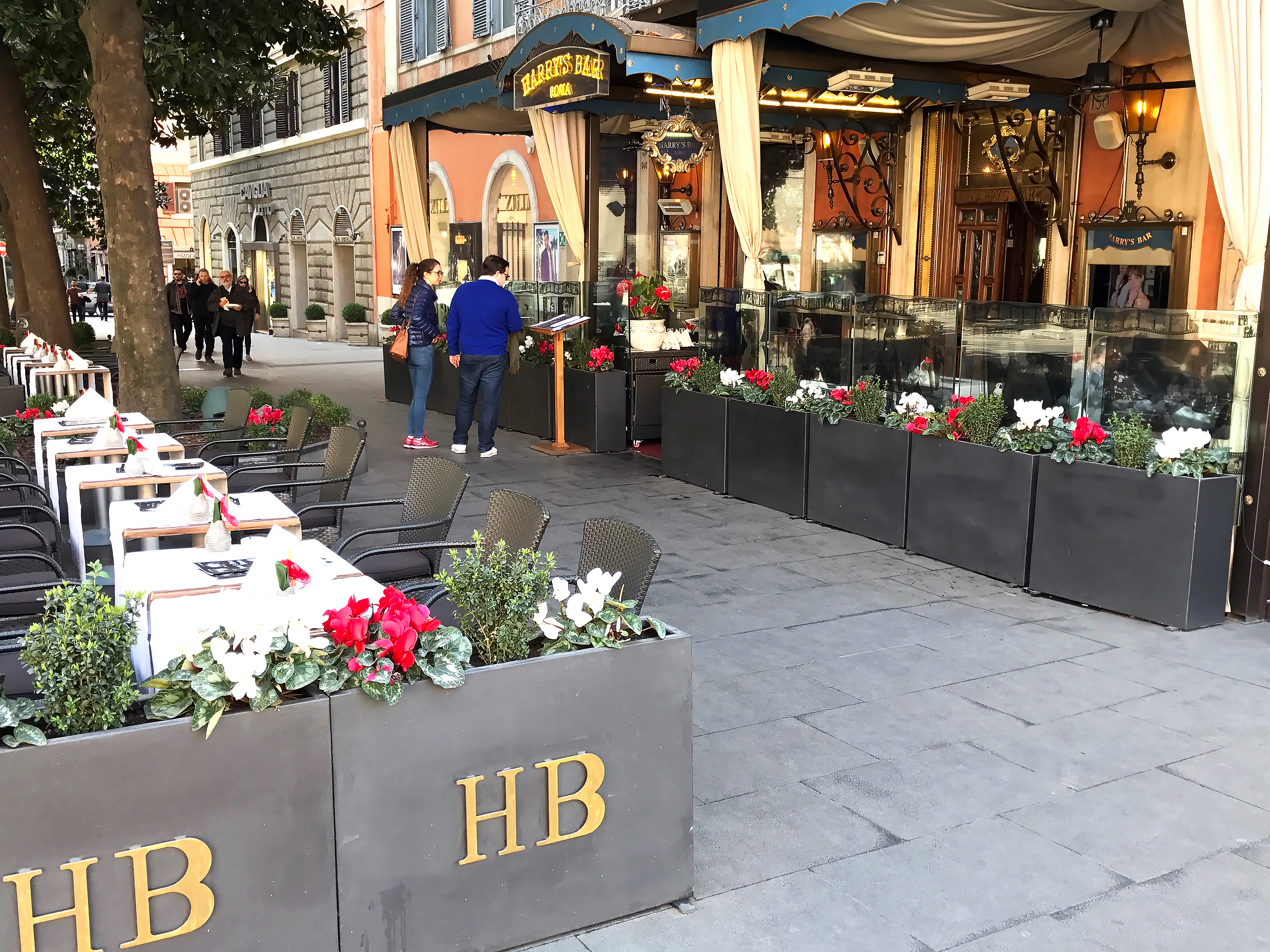
Harry's Bar Rome

Harry's Bar Rome opened in 1918 under the name "Golden Gate". The owner, an American woman who lived in Rome, found her inspiration for the restaurant name from her native town of San Francisco, California. The Golden Gate is the strait between San Francisco Bay and the Pacific Ocean.

The owner, originally from Rome, decided to open the bar as a tea saloon. In 1950, a new owner bought the place and decided to renovate the business and change its name from Golden Gate to Harry's Bar Rome.

=== Dolce Vita years ===
During the "Dolce Vita" years (late 1950s to early 1960s), Harry's Bar had its most successful period. Rome saw a period of economic boom. Cinecittà attracted American directors, producers, actors and actresses.

Celebrities who used to spend their time in this bar include Jean Paul Belmondo, Ava Gardner, Federico Fellini, Lana Turner, Marlon Brando, Alberto Sordi, Audrey Hepburn, Sophia Loren and Silvana Pampanini.

During this period, it was usual to see Anita Ekberg seated at the table drinking after shopping in Via Frattina. Frank Sinatra famously played the bar's piano.

The paparazzi crowded the exit of Harry's Bar Rome in order to take celebrity photos, including Rino Barillari, a historic Dolce Vita photographer.

=== Aftermath ===
During the 80s, Harry's Bar Rome was bought and renovated by the Cremonini group.

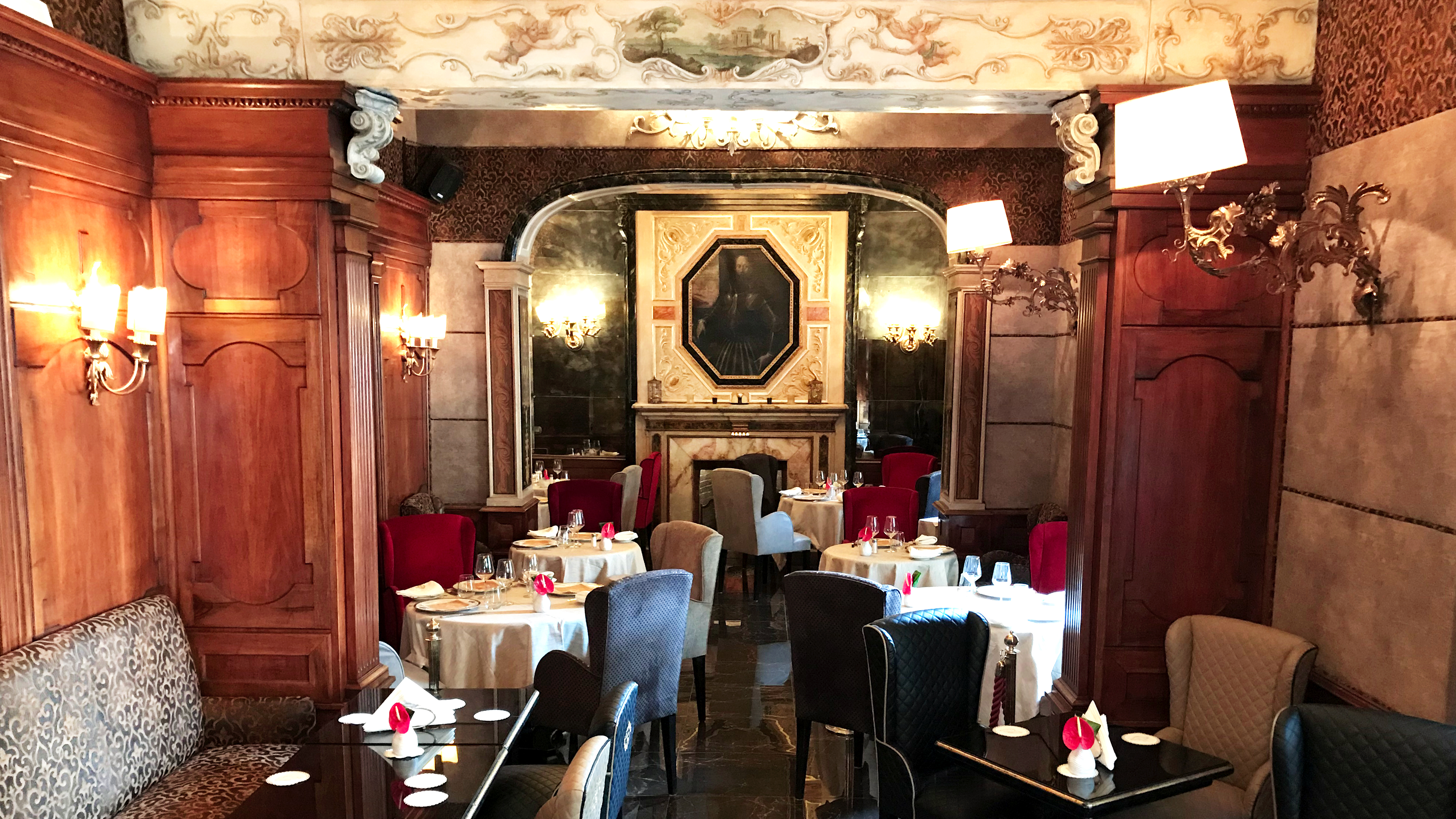
Harry's Bar Rome - Inside view

In the early 2000s Harry's Bar Rome was bought and renovated by the Lepore family. Today, the bar recreates the atmosphere of the Dolce Vita years.

Many later celebrities visited Harry's Bar Rome, including Mel Gibson, Woody Allen, Katherine Kelly Lang, Romina Power, Carla Bruni, Anthony Hopkins, Pamela Prati, Paolo Sorrentino and United States Secretary of State Hillary Clinton.

In 2013, the bar was used as set for the Oscar award-winning film The Great Beauty by Paolo Sorrentino.

== See also ==
- Harry's New York Bar in Paris
- Harry's Bar (Venice)
