= Reka Der-Cipriani =

Italian fencer (born 1943)

Personal information
- Born: 6 June 1943 (age 83)

Sport
- Sport: Fencing

Reka Der-Cipriani (born 6 June 1943) is an Italian fencer. She competed in the women's team foil event at the 1972 Summer Olympics, placing fourth.
