= Renato Cipriani =

Italian footballer (born 1917)

Personal information
- Date of birth: 2 April 1917
- Place of birth: Rome, Kingdom of Italy
- Position: Midfielder

Senior career*
Years	Team	Apps	(Gls)
1933–1934	A.S. Alba Roma	?	(?)
1934–1940	Roma	2	(0)
1940–1943	Cavese	?	(?)
1945–1948	A.C. Nocerina	74	(3)
1948–1950	Frosinone	46	(1)
1954–1955	Federconsorzi Roma	?	(?)

Managerial career
- 1941–1942: Cavese
- * Club domestic league appearances and goals

Renato Cipriani (born 2 April 1917) was an Italian professional football player.

Cipriani spent 4 seasons in the Serie A with A.S. Roma, playing 2 games.
