= Renee Cipriano =

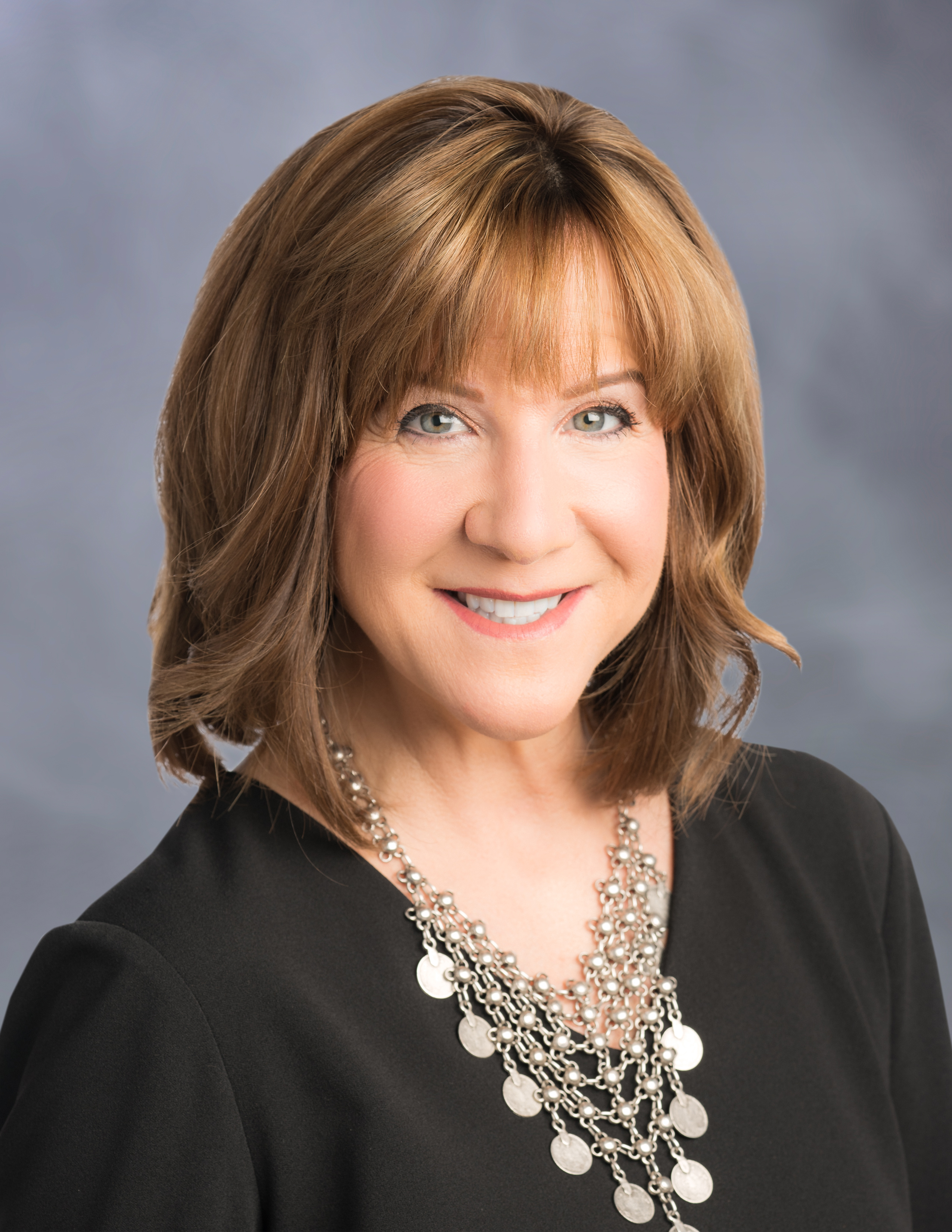

Former Director, Illinois Environmental Protection Agency
- In office 2001–2005
- Preceded by: Thomas Skinner
- Succeeded by: Douglas P. Scott

Personal details
- Occupation: Partner, law firm Thompson Coburn LLP

Renee Cipriano is currently a Partner and Environmental Lawyer with Thompson Coburn LLP in Chicago, Illinois. Ms. Cipriano provides strategic planning and counseling around statutory and regulatory requirements, enforcement and compliance.

Cipriano is the former director of the Illinois Environmental Protection Agency. She left the Illinois EPA in May 2005 after almost four years as director. She was succeeded by Douglas P. Scott.

== Views on product regulations ==
Cipriano sees significant tension between federal and state product regulation, including those meant to protect the environment from contaminants that have been incorporated into products. She thinks the fact that states, not federal lawmakers, adopt and enforce most of these product regulations presents "great challenges", for manufacturers, distributors, and retailers in particular.

== Awards and appointments ==
In 2009, Cipriano was appointed to the Illinois Carbon Capture and Sequestration Legislation Commission by Illinois Senate President John J. Cullerton.

Cipriano, who is co-chair of Keep Chicago Beautiful, won its President's Lifetime Volunteer Service Award in 2011. Keep Chicago Beautiful is an affiliate of Keep America Beautiful, an environmental organization that advocates litter prevention, recycling, and community greening.

In October 2011, she was named 2012 Chicago Environmental Law Lawyer of the Year by Best Lawyers.

A February 9, 2006 Chicago Tribune article written by Michael Hawthorne[2] raised the issue of Cipriano registering as a lobbyist for Ameren less than a year after leaving public office. The article cites a 2003 ethics law barring state employees from working for companies they formerly regulated for at least one year.

However, the article also stated that an EPA spokeswoman argued "that the law doesn't apply to Cipriano's new job lobbying for a power company subject to scores of environmental regulations."
