= Cipriano Targioni =

Italian scientific instrument maker (1672–1748)

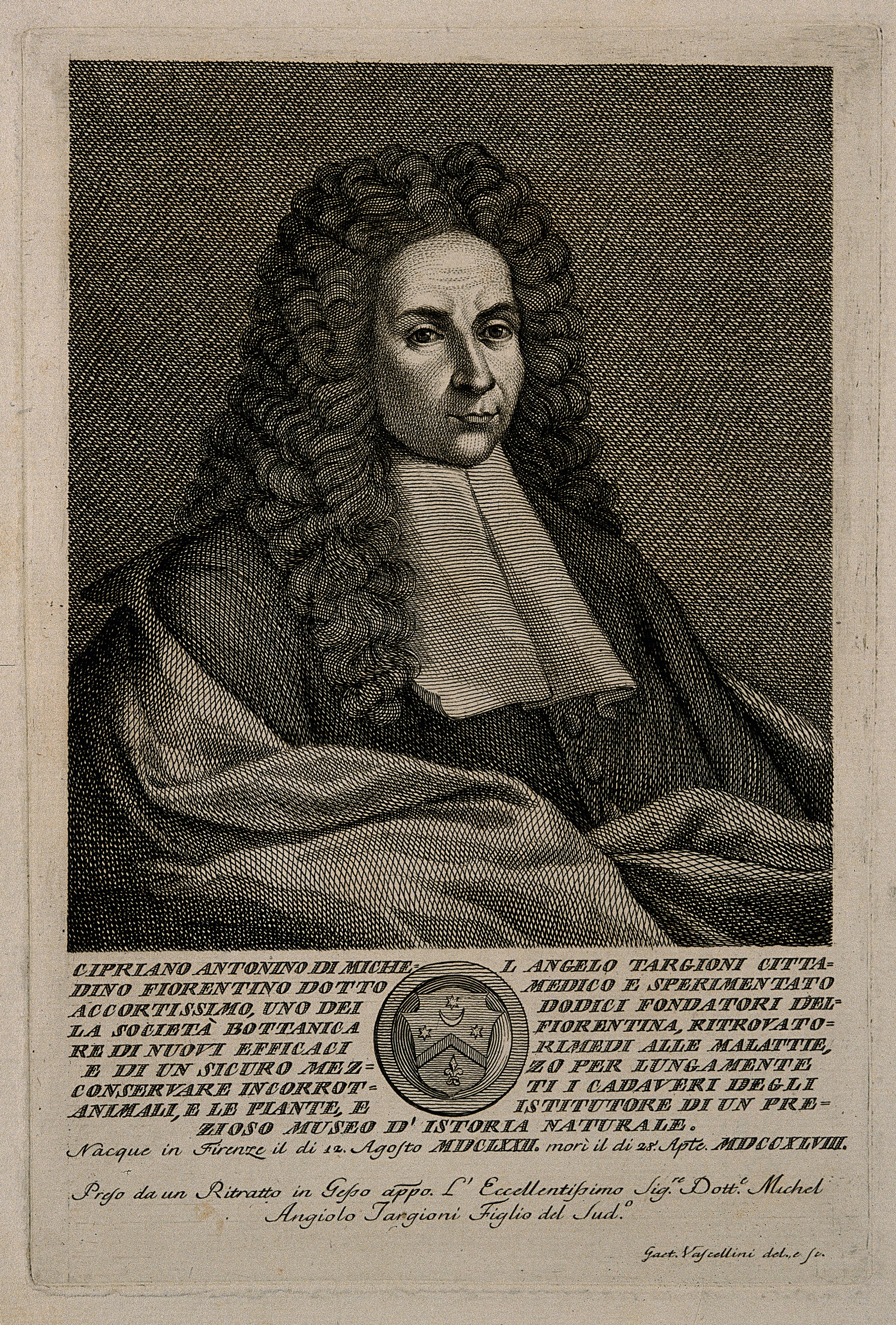

Cipriano Targioni (1672–1748) was an Italian scientific instrument maker.

He was born in Florence, Grand Duchy of Tuscany. Targioni studied medicine at the University of Pisa. On returning to his native town, he was named supervisor of the observations and physical experiments carried out in the Galleria Medicea by order of the Grand Duke of Tuscany, Cosimo III de' Medici. He developed methods for preserving animal corpses for anatomical dissection. Targioni also conducted meteorological observations on a systematic basis beginning in 1728.
