= Giuseppe Cipriani (chef) =

Italian chef

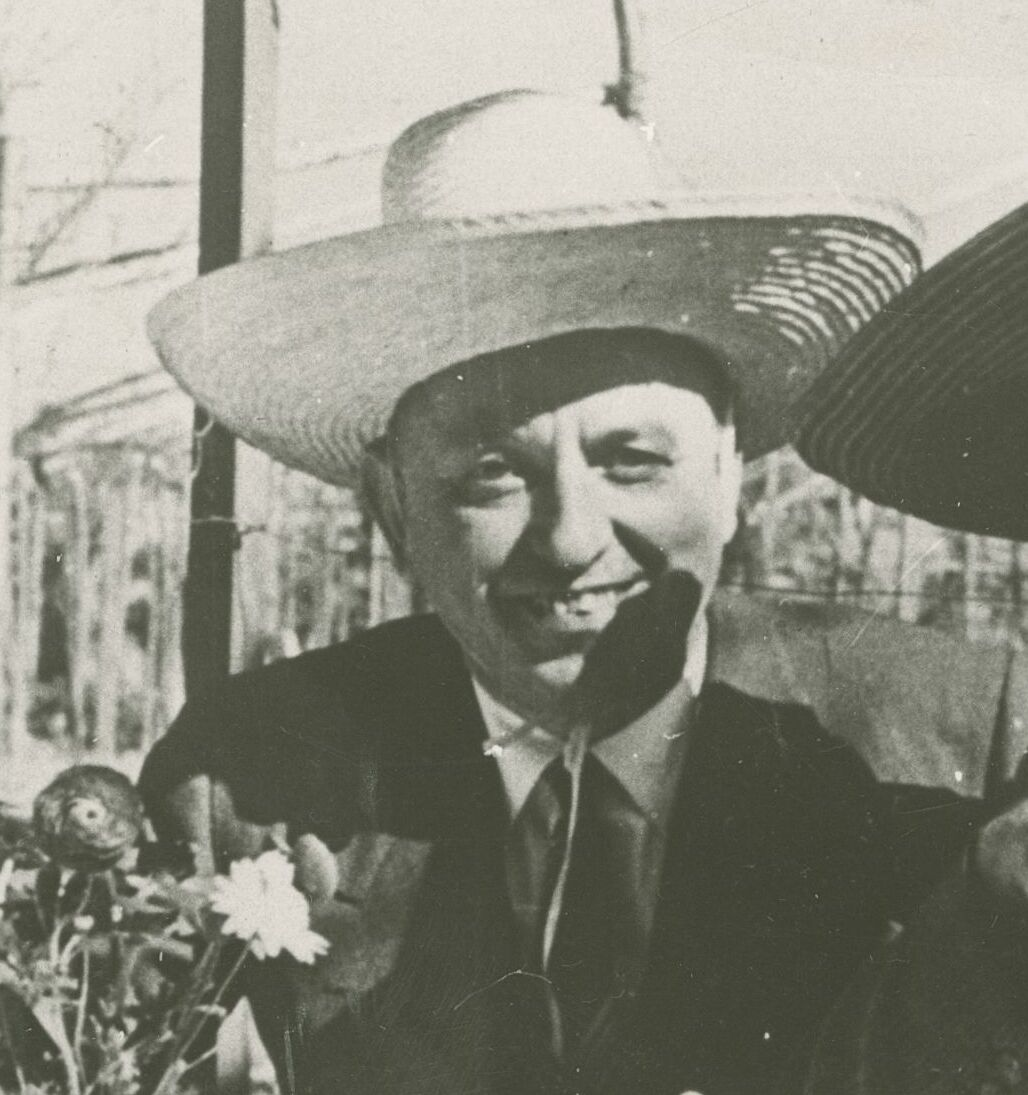
Cipriani in 1954

Giuseppe Cipriani (1900–1980) was an Italian chef who founded Harry's Bar in Venice in 1931. He created the Bellini cocktail and the raw beef dish carpaccio. In 1956, he founded the Belmond Hotel Cipriani in Venice. In 2023, it was named the best hotel in the world by La Liste.

== See also ==
- Cipriani S.A.
