= Ermes di Colorêt =

Italian count and writer (1622–1692)

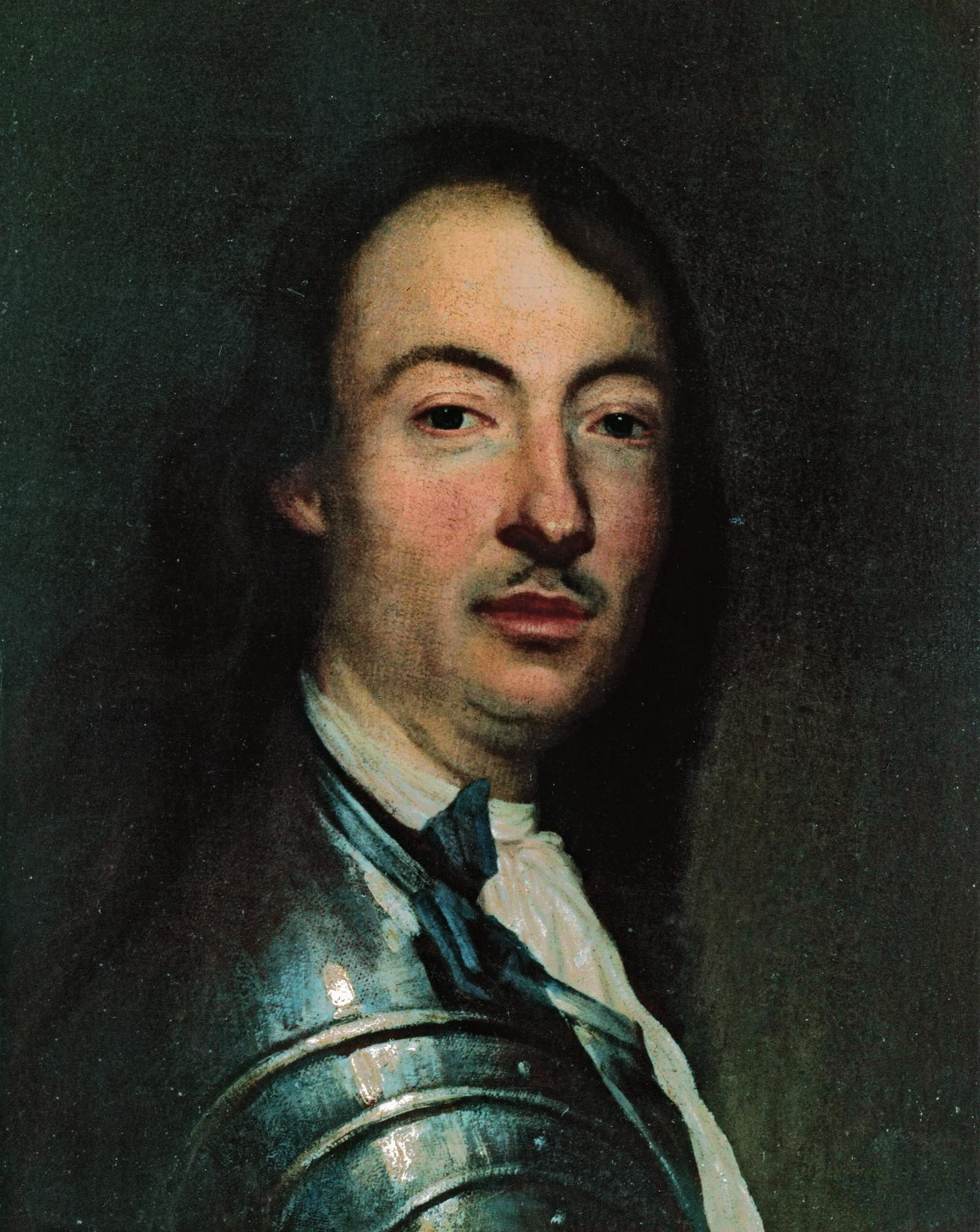
- Sebastiano Bombelli, Portrait of Ermes di Colorêt, oil on canvas, Venice, private collection
- Born: 28 March 1622; Colloredo di Monte Albano, Republic of Venice
- Died: 21 September 1692 (aged 70); Gorizzo, Codroipo, Republic of Venice
- Occupations: Poet; Writer; Soldier
- Writing career
- Parent(s): Orazio di Colorêt and Lucia di Colorêt (née di Porcia)
- Language: Friulian; Italian
- Period: 17th century; Baroque literature
- Genres: Poetry; dialogue
- Literary movement: Baroque

Ermes di Colloredo (28 March 1622 – 21 September 1692) was an Italian count and writer who served the Grand Duke of Tuscany, the Holy Roman Emperor and the Republic of Venice. He is widely considered the father and innovator of Friulian literature.

== Biography ==
Ermes was born in Colloredo di Monte Albano, Friaul. A cousin of Ciro di Pers, he was educated at the Medici court in Florence as page of Grand Duke Ferdinando II, and subsequently became a career soldier. He entered the service of Emperor Ferdinand III during the Thirty Years War as a Cuirassiers' Officier, at the orders of his uncle, Generalfeldmarschall Rudolf von Colloredo, Governor of Prague, and later served the Republic of Venice as a Cavalry Colonel. He retired in 1658 to his estate, to focus on writing poetry, most of which centers on the theme of love.

Ermes wrote over 200 sonnets, in both Friulian and Italian. He used the koinè from San Daniele, which would become the most notable literary language and the basis of today's standard Friulian. Di Colloredo's poetry strikes particularly in its Baroque imagery. His lively dialogues are generally considered the genuine origins of Friulian prose. Ermes di Colorêt died in Gorizzo, Codroipo, on September 21, 1692.

== See also ==
- Friulian literature

== Sources ==
- Benzoni, Gino (1982). "COLLOREDO, Ermes". Dizionario Biografico degli Italiani (in Italian). Vol. 27: Collenuccio–Confortini. Rome: Istituto dell'Enciclopedia Italiana. ISBN 978-88-12-00032-6.
- Haller, Hermann W. (1999). The Other Italy: The Literary Canon in Dialect. University of Toronto Press. ISBN 0802044247.
- Slawinski, M. (2002). "Ermes di Colloredo". The Oxford Companion to Italian Literature. Oxford University Press.
