= Ca' Giustinian =

Palace in Venice, Italy

Coordinates: 45°25′56″N 12°20′12″E

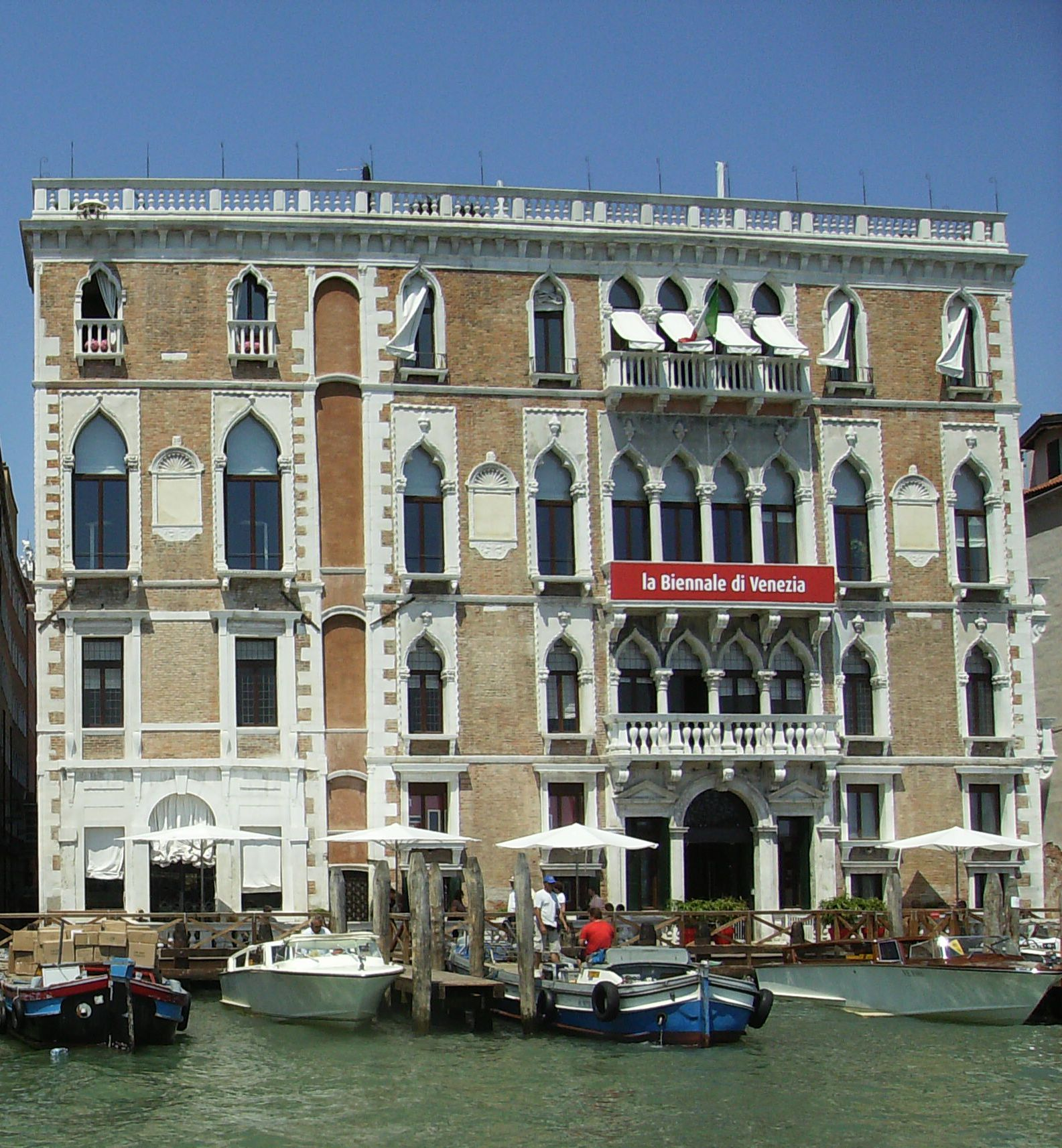
Ca' Giustinian

The Ca' Giustinian, sometimes called the Palazzo Giustinian, is a palace on the Grand Canal in the San Marco sestiere of Venice, Italy. It is today the seat of the Venice Biennale. Built in 1471, it was among the last Gothic palazzi built in Venice. It was partially modernized in the 17th century.

== Design ==
The current building is the fusion of two earlier buildings, the larger Giustinian to the east and the smaller Badoer-Tiepolo to the west.

== Location ==
Ca' Giustinian fronts on the Grand Canal on the south. To its left, separated by the Calle Tredici Martiri, is the Bauer Hotel, and to its right, separated by the Calle Ridotto, is the Hotel Monaco and Grand Canal.

== History ==
Starting in around 1820, the palazzo was the Hotel Europa, also called the Hotel d'Europa and the Albergo d'Europa. Many famous visitors stayed here, including Chateaubriand, Rodolphe Töpffer, Théophile Gautier, George Eliot, and Richard Wagner.

The modern Westin Europa shares the name, but not the location.

Ca' Giustinian is now the seat of the Venice Biennale.
