= Clifford Y. Stephens =

Owner of High's Dairy Store (1891–1971)

Clifford Young Stephens
- Died: 1963; Anne Arundel County, Severn River Bridge
- Education: Iowa State University
- Occupation: Businessman
- Known for: High's franchise
- Spouse: Mary Ann Marsh
- Children: Alan Craig Stephens, Mark, Patric, Greg, Jeffery, Peggy (Corey), Barbara (Anderson), Mary Margret

Clifford Y. Stephens (1902–1963) was the owner of High's Dairy Store and the namesake of Stephens Auditorium, part of the Iowa State Center at Iowa State University.

Stephens started out as a farmer and dairyman. He attended Iowa State University and graduated in 1925 working locally. Later he worked for Pet in Greensboro North Carolina. At the peak of the depression in 1933, he bought controlling interest in the Washington-based High's Dairy Products Corporation. With a $1,800 loan he operated ten ice cream stores and a plant at 1326 Half Street SE in Washington. In 1941, Stephens took over as sole owner of the High's Dairy Store Corporation. Stephens opened plants in Washington and Frederick to process milk. The Frederick plant opened in 1959 with a production capacity of 100,000 gallons daily. He became active in politics regarding milk cooperatives, creating "Marylander for Milk Freedom" in 1959 to oppose price controls on state milk production. In 1961, Stephens created the East Coast Ice Cream Novelty Company which constructed a large ice cream manufacturing plant on Whiskey Bottom Road. The plant in later years would be expanded to become the second-largest ice cream plant on the east coast, operated by Nestle, with the offices later becoming the Phillips School for students with cognitive, emotional, social learning or behavioral challenges.

Stephens became a trustee of Hood College in Frederick and Glenelg Country School. In 1962, he donated all of his stock to his alma mater, the Campus of Iowa State University which in turn named an auditorium after him. The Capitol Milk Producers of Frederick repurchased the stock, retaining Stephens as president. In 1962, Senator Frank E. Shipley bypassed the state school board nominating commission recommendation of Fred Schoenbrodt, and installed C.Y. Stephens. In October 1963, Stephens was indicted with multiple milk producers for price fixing between 1956 and 1960. A month later, Stephens died outside of Annapolis, Maryland in an automobile collision on the Severn River Bridge on 29 November 1963.

- Stephens Road in North Laurel is named after C.Y. Stephens

== See also ==
- North Laurel, Maryland
