= Triest (surname) =

Triest is a surname. Notable people with the surname include:

- Anthonius Triest (1576–1657), Roman Catholic bishop of Bruges and of Ghent
- Howard Triest (1923–2016), German-born United States Army translator
- Joran Triest (born 1997), Belgian footballer
- Monika Triest (born 1941), Belgian academic, writer, and civil rights activist
- Petrus Joseph Triest (1760–1836), Belgian Roman Catholic priest
- Willard Gustav Triest (1905–1989), American civil engineer, son of Wolfgang
- Wolfgang Gustav Triest (c. 1863 – 1946), American civil engineer

== See also ==
- Shirley Julian (1914–1995), also known as Shirley Triest, American visual artist
