= Severn Bridge (disambiguation) =

Severn Bridge may refer to:

== Bridges ==
=== Australia ===
- Severn River railway bridge, Dundee, over the Severn River at Dundee in New South Wales

=== United Kingdom ===
- Severn Bridge, the first road bridge over the Severn Estuary between England and Wales
- Second Severn Crossing, over the Severn Estuary between England and Wales
- Severn Railway Bridge, over the Severn Estuary in England

=== United States ===
- Severn River Bridge, also known as Pearl Harbor Memorial Bridge, over the Severn River in Maryland
- Naval Academy Bridge, over the Severn River in Maryland

== Other uses ==
- Severn Bridge, Ontario, a community in Ontario, Canada
- Severn Bridge railway station, Gloucestershire, England

== See also ==
- List of crossings of the River Severn
- Seven Bridges (disambiguation)
