= Jonas Green Park =

Park in Anne Arundel County, Maryland, United States

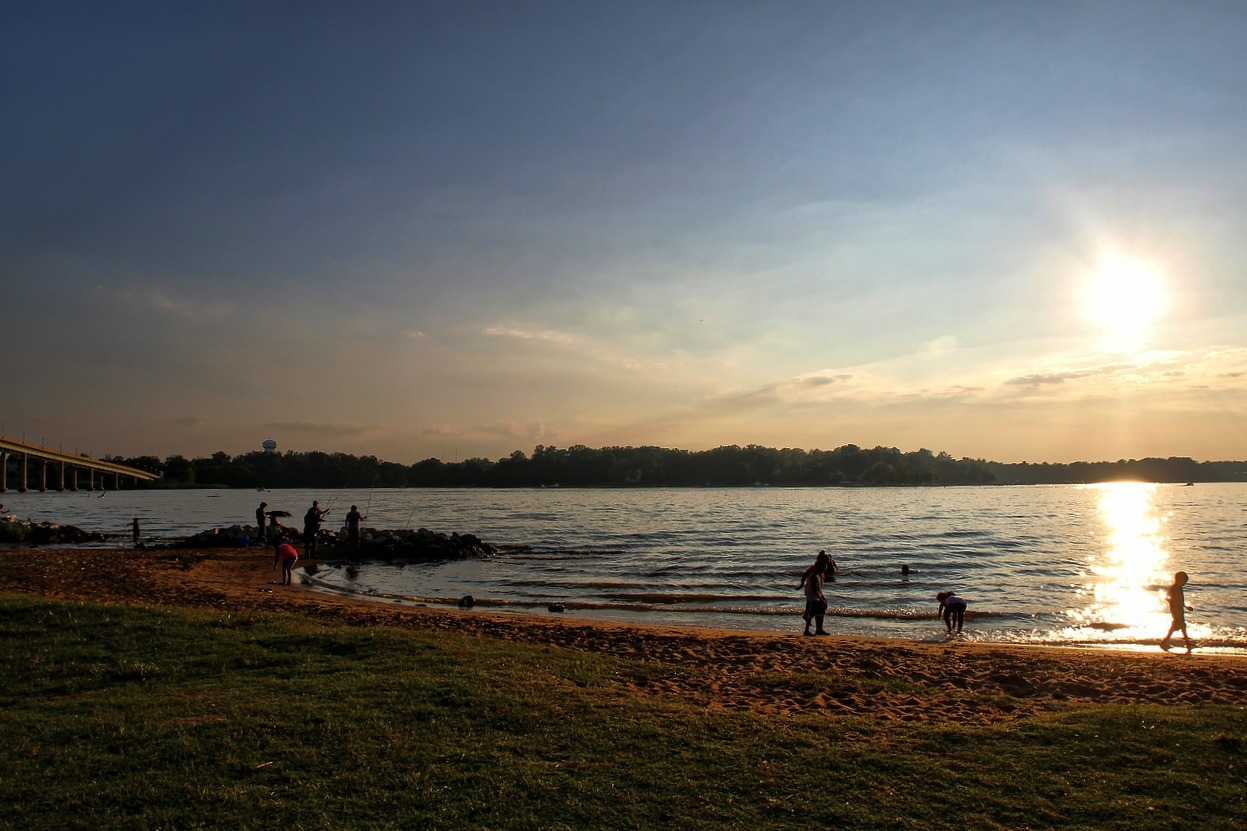
- The park's Severn River shore with the Naval Academy Bridge in the distance

- Location within Maryland
- Location: Annapolis, Anne Arundel, Maryland, United States
- Coordinates: 38°59′45″N 76°29′03″W
- Area: 6 acres (2.4 ha)
- Elevation: 3 ft (0.91 m)
- Established: Unspecified
- Operator: Anne Arundel County Department of Recreation and Parks
- Website: Jonas Green Park

Jonas Green Park is a public recreation area on the Severn River owned and operated by Anne Arundel County, Maryland. The park sits at the east end of the Naval Academy Bridge on Maryland Route 450 just outside the city of Annapolis. The former state park bears the name of Jonas Green, Maryland’s public printer during the colonial period. It was turned over to the county in 2009. The park offers a visitors center, cartop boat launch site, and fishing pier. It is the southern terminus of the Baltimore & Annapolis Trail.
