= Phillips School (Laurel, Maryland) =

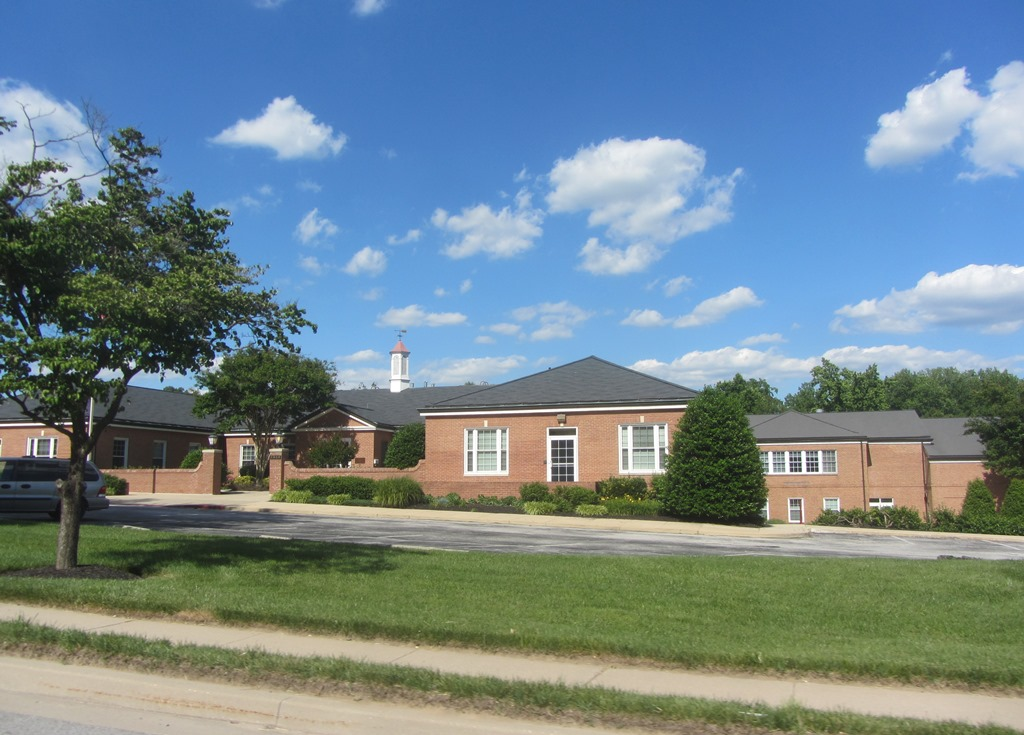

Location
- 8920 Whiskey Bottom Road; Laurel, Maryland 20723; United States
- 39°06′45″N 76°49′38″W

Information
- Type: Private School
- Established: 1994
- School district: Within Howard County Public School System boundaries

Phillips School serves families from Howard County, Maryland, United States. It is not affiliated with the Howard County Public School System.

== School history ==
In 1967, the School for Contemporary Education was founded by Larkin Phillips to work with children and youth with cognitive, emotional, social learning or behavioral challenges. The school moved to the Laurel facility from Baltimore 1994 in the former headquarters of High's Dairy, built by Clifford Y. Stephens in 1961, which was split off from the adjacent Nestlé ice cream plant.

In 2014, the adjacent historic Duvall Farm was rezoned from agricultural to transit-oriented development, allowing high volume trucking operations across from the school to accommodate Coastal Sunbelt Produce.

== Renovation ==
An expansion of the facility was built in 1998.
