= Jock Freedman =

American bridge engineer (1930–2026)

Earle "Jock" Freedman
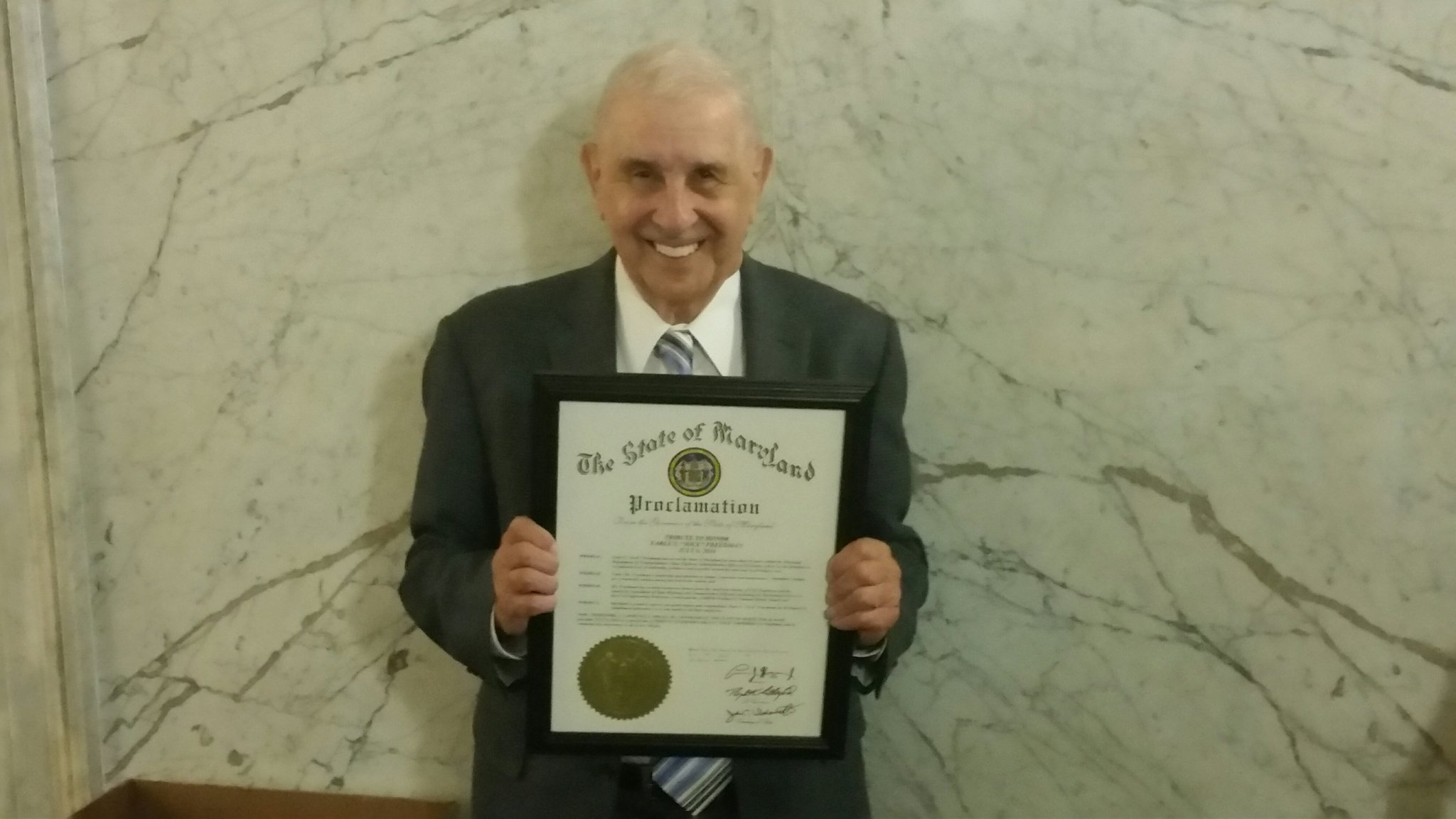
- Earle Freedman
- Born: February 18, 1930; Baltimore, Maryland, U.S.
- Died: April 9, 2026 (aged 96)
- Occupation: Bridge Engineer

Earle "Jock" Freedman (February 10, 1930 – April 9, 2026) was an American bridge engineer and the State of Maryland's "longest-serving" employee. Freedman, affectionately known as "Jock", began his career at age 19 in 1950 following graduation from Johns Hopkins University. For over 65 years, Freedman designed and maintained over 2,500 bridges for the Maryland State Highway Administration. Freedman was generally recognized as one of the "foremost bridge engineers" in the country. Freedman oversaw the design and construction of the Naval Academy Bridge that crosses the Severn River in Annapolis, Maryland. The first competition of its kind, Freedman created a design contest in which a collection of engineers would consider and evaluate various design submissions without knowledge of who designed the plans. Freedman toured the site with Governor William Donald Schaefer who shared Freedman's belief of bridges that incorporated scenic and aesthetic features. In 2004, the state of Maryland honored Freedman by "putting his name on a new bridge carrying Reisterstown Road over the Beltway." Freedman received the 2016 AASHTO Alfred E. Johnson Achievement Award for his "outstanding contribution in engineering."

Freedman died on April 9, 2026, at the age of 96.
