= Senator Shipley =

Senator Shipley may refer to:

- Frank E. Shipley (1891–1971), Maryland State Senate
- Tom Shipley (politician) (born 1953), Iowa State Senate
