= Frederick Snare Corporation =

American construction contracting firm

- Formerly: Snare & Triest Company
- Company type: Construction engineering
- Industry: Construction
- Founded: 1898 in Philadelphia
- Founders: Frederick Snare; W.G. Triest

Frederick Snare Corporation, formerly known as the Snare & Triest Company, was an American engineering and construction firm.

== History ==
The Snare & Triest Company was established in the late 1890s. Frederick Snare and Wolfgang Gustav Triest, a civil engineer active in bridge construction, created the Snare & Triest Company in 1898. The Snare & Triest Company was incorporated in 1900, with Snare as the President. It was a privately held company with offices in Philadelphia, New York, Havana, Lima, and Columbia.

Among the engineering and construction projects completed by the Frederick Snare Corporation were pier building, constructing terminals, developing power plants, planning bridges, building sugar mills, and handling complex foundation projects. Around 1912, Snare's son Frederick Snare Jr. joined the firm, eventually becoming an executive of the company in 1919.

The company set up a Cuban headquarters and built much of Havana's early infrastructure, including highways and railways. In 1912, the Frederick Snare Company built the main railway terminal in Havana, the Havana Central railway station. By the mid-1910s, the Snare & Triest Company was constructing streetcar railways in Havana. The company was engaged in the work of constructing Havana's Víbora Sub Station in 1918.

The Snare & Triest Company became the Frederick Snare Corporation Contracting Engineers in the early 1920s. By about 1921, Frederick Snare and W.G. Triest decided to go separate ways. In New York, W.G. Triest established the firm, Triest Contracting Corporation, subway and bridge builders of New York.

In the 1930s, the Frederick Snare Corporation of New York City won the bid to build the Rip Van Winkle Bridge.

In July 1940, the firm was awarded a building contract by the Navy for its role in the development of a naval operating base at Guantánamo Bay.

In 1946, the construction of the national sports stadium, Estadio Latinoamericano, in Havana was executed by the Snare company and Cuban architect Max Borges Jr.

== Projects ==
=== Construction ===
- Whitehall Street Ferry Terminal (1908)
- Battery Maritime Building (1909)
- Havana Central railway station (1912)
- Nicaro Nickel Processing Plant (1942)
- Estadio Latinoamericano (1946)
- Habana Hilton (1958)
- West Side Highway

=== Bridge engineering ===
- North Market Street Bridge (1928)
- Triborough Bridge
- Bronx–Whitestone Bridge
- Rip Van Winkle Bridge
- Verrazzano–Narrows Bridge
- Newburgh–Beacon Bridge
- Severn River Bridge
- Sarah Mildred Long Bridge (1940)

=== Waterfront facilities ===
- Southwark Municipal Piers
- Chelsea Piers
