= Iowa State Center =

Coordinates: 42.020855°N 93.636972°W

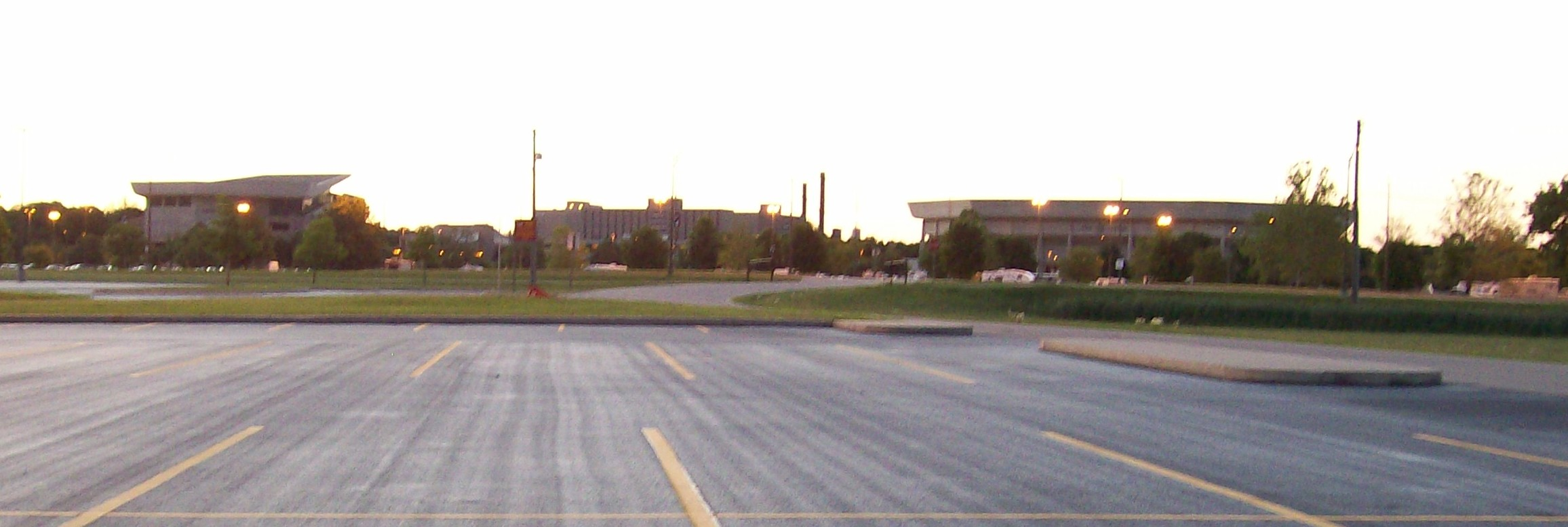
Iowa State Center

The Iowa State Center is located just southeast of Iowa State University's central campus in Ames, Iowa. It is a complex of cultural and athletic venues. The Center consists of the following: Hilton Coliseum, Stephens Auditorium, Fisher Theater, Scheman Building, and Jack Trice Stadium.

== Overview ==
James Hilton (1899–1982), the 10th president of ISU, proposed the construction of an educational, cultural and athletic complex to faculty in 1954. In 1958 the ISU Foundation was formed with the primary goal of raising funds for the construction of the Iowa State Center. The ISU Foundation still exists and is currently working on raising $800 million in donations to be used in all aspects of the University.

The state did not appropriate any funds for the construction of the Center. The first donation was two dollars from an anonymous donor, the second donation was one million dollars from C. Y. Stephens, for whom Stephens Auditorium is named. The center is located on 76 acres (310,000 m^{2}), originally university agricultural fields, and is run by 40 full-time employees.

Iowa State Center
Structure	Completion Date	Cost	Capacity
Fisher Theater	1974	$900,000	454
Hilton Coliseum	1971	$8.1 million	14,356
Jack Trice Stadium	1975	$7.6 million	61,500
Scheman Building	1975	$5.3 million	-
Stephens Auditorium	1969	$4.9 million	2,747

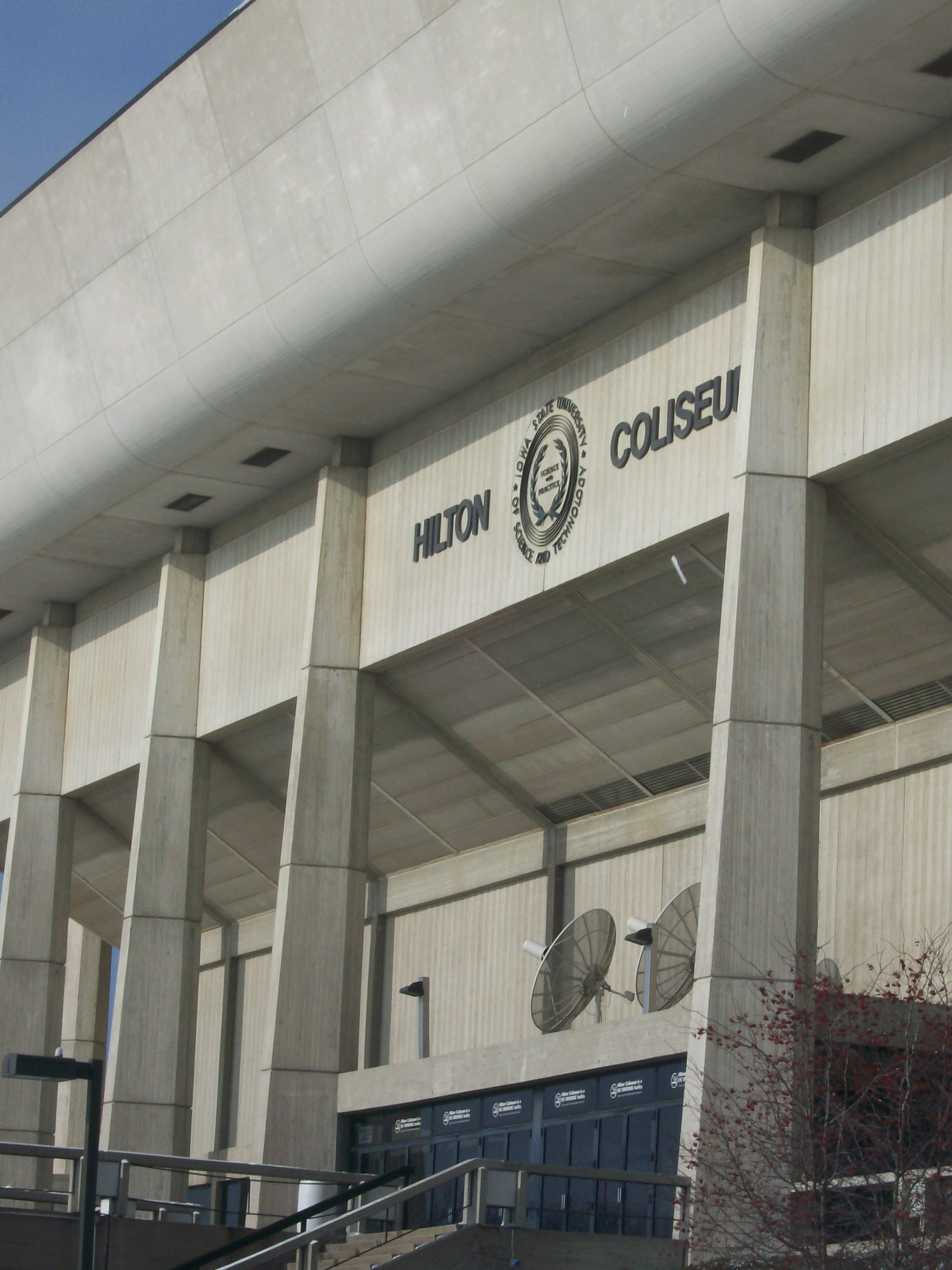
Main entrance Hilton Coliseum

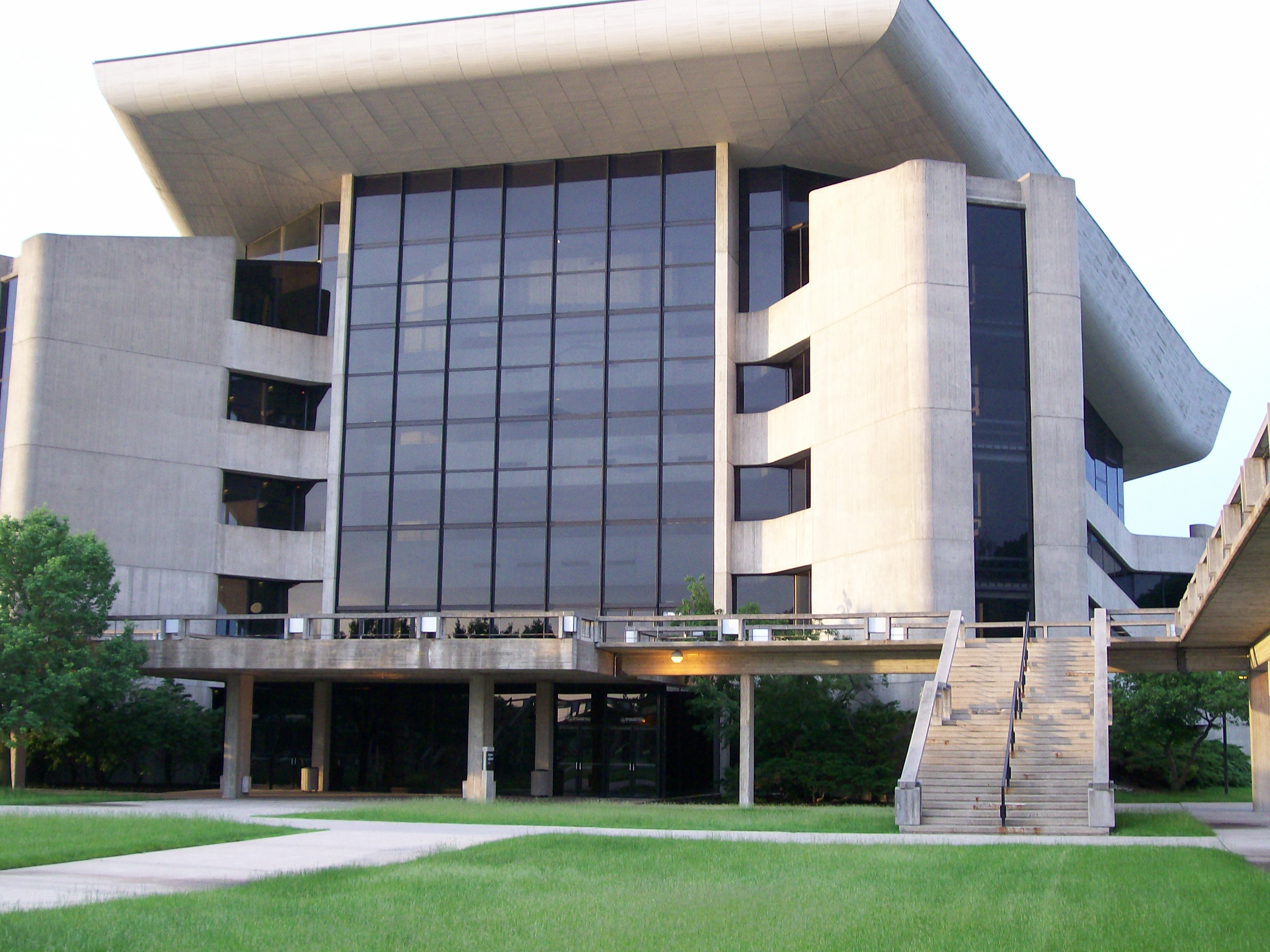
North entrance to Stephens Auditorium

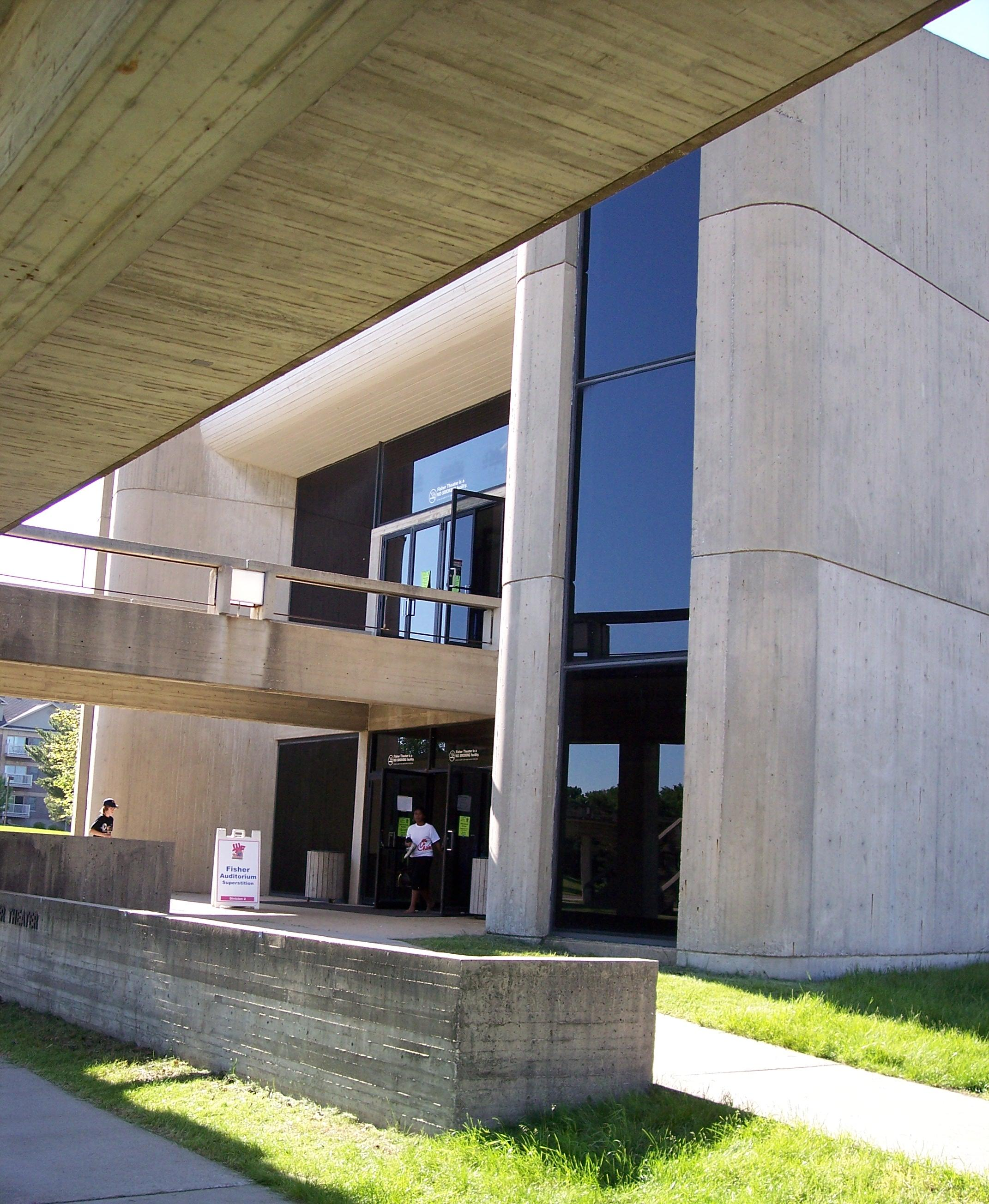
South entrance of Fisher Theater

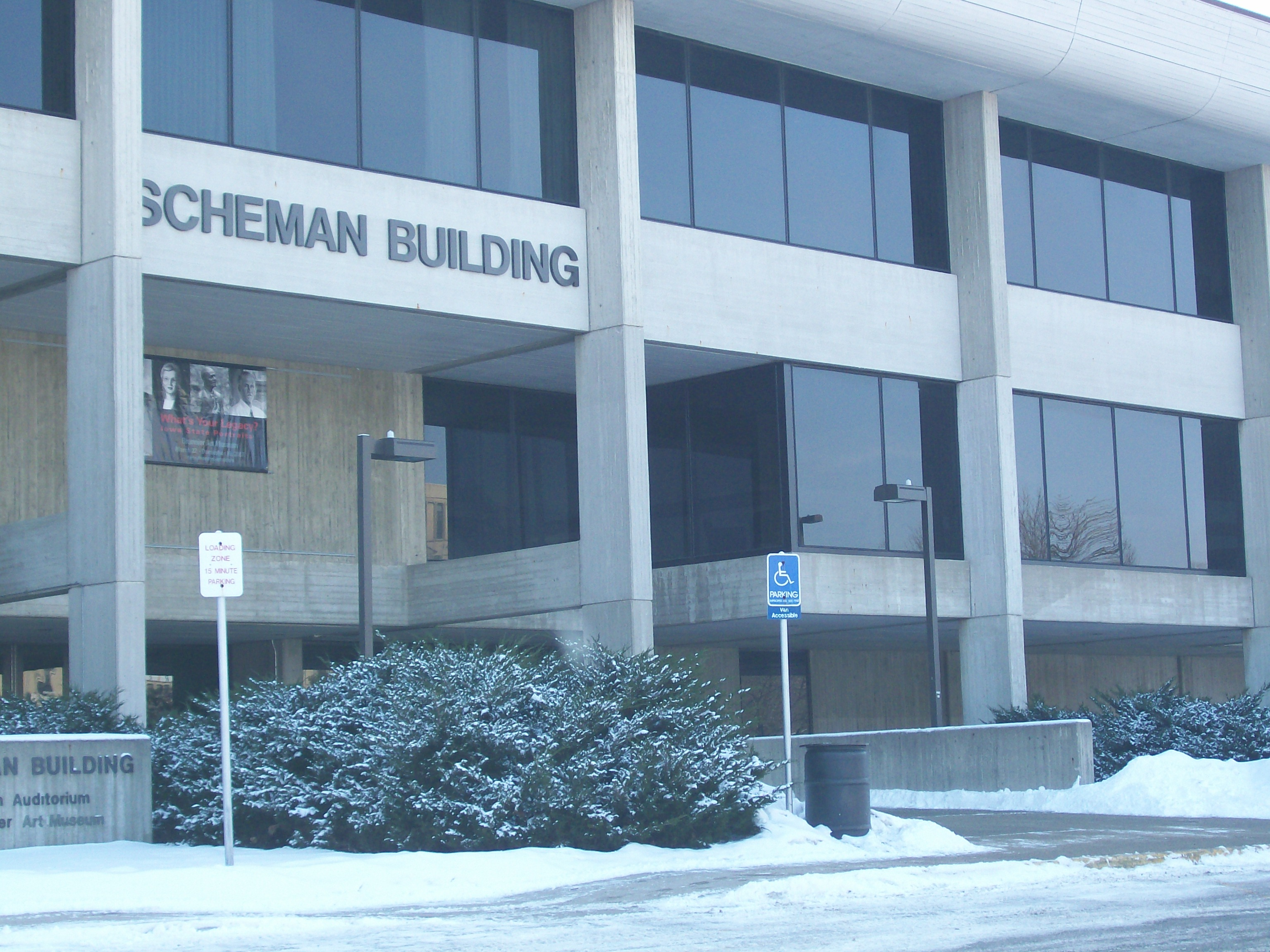
Main entrance of Scheman Building

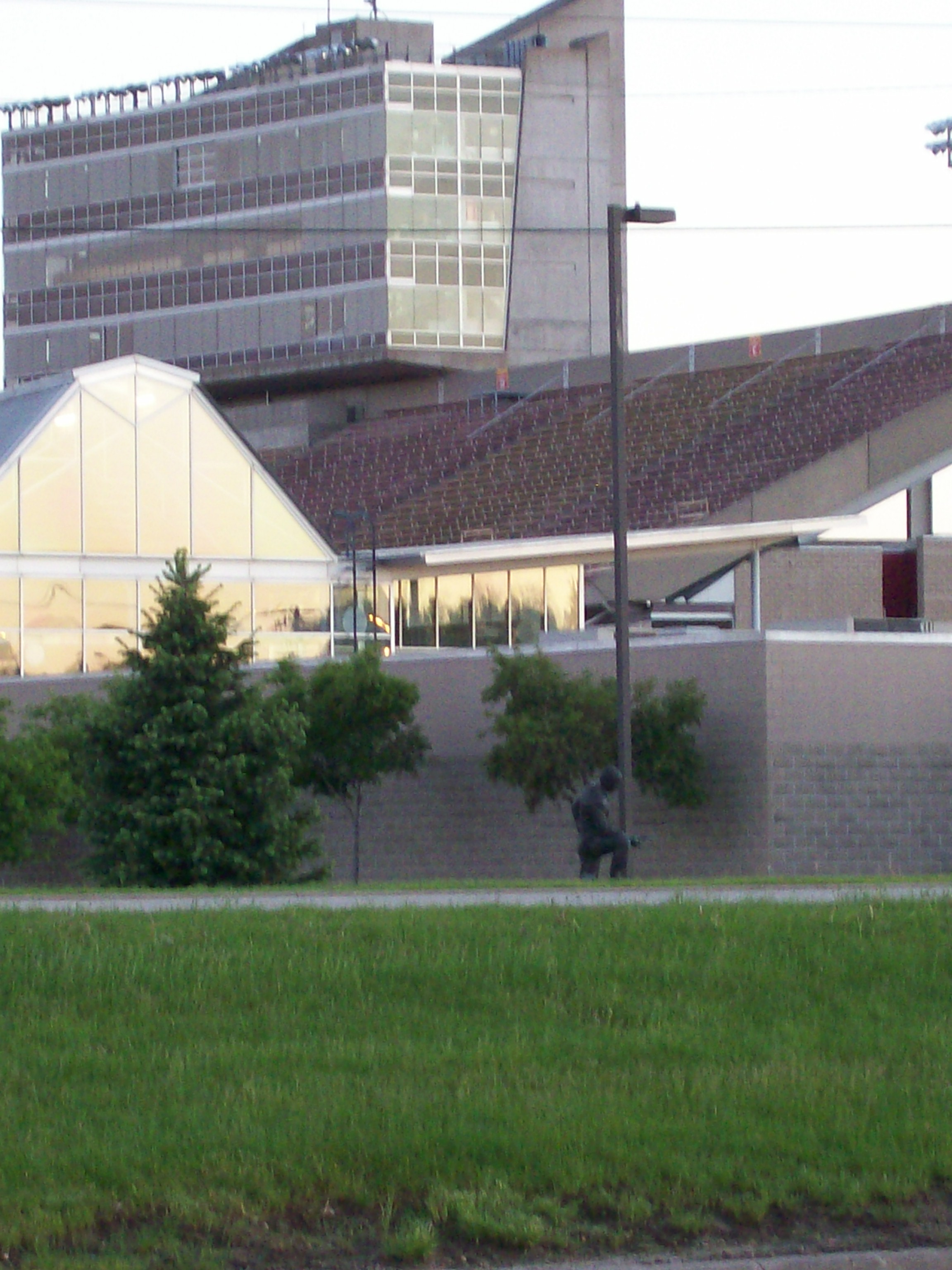
Jack Trice Football Complex

== Complex information ==
=== Stephens Auditorium ===
Stephens Auditorium was named after Clifford Y. Stephens for his contribution to the auditorium. Construction started in 1965 and was completed in 1969 with a cost of $4.9 million. The New York Philharmonic Orchestra presented the opening concerts during a week long festival. The 2,747 seat auditorium was named Building of the Century by the American Institute of Architects, Iowa Chapter in 2004.

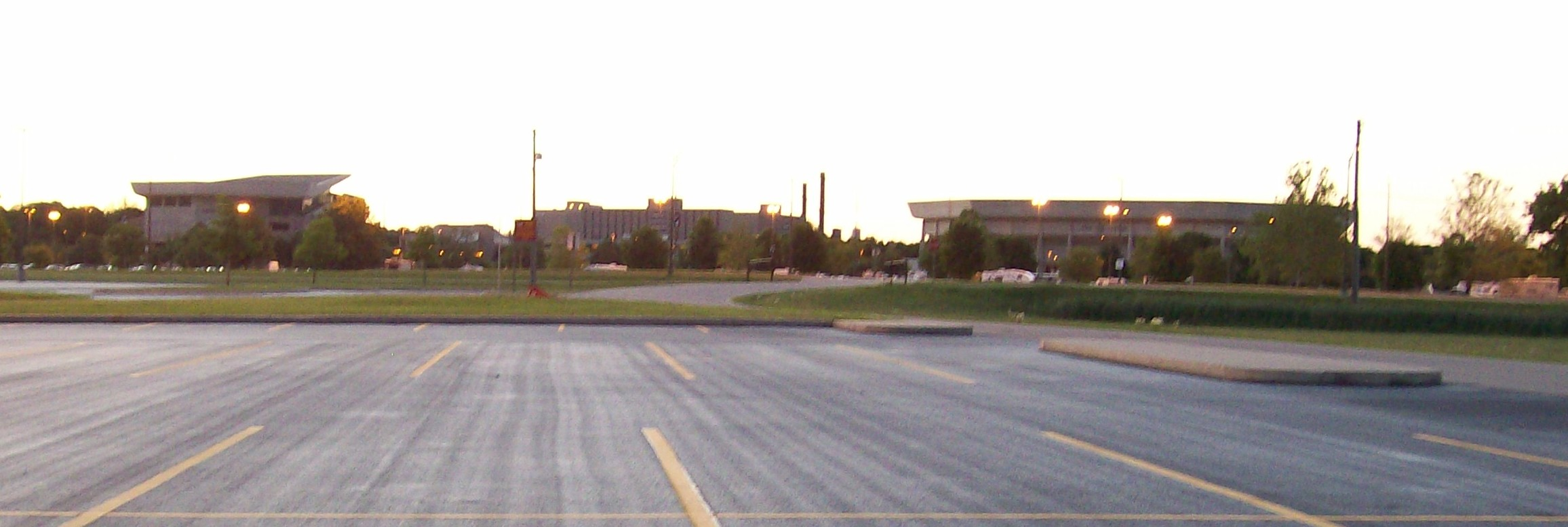
Iowa State Center, Hilton Coliseum and Stephens Auditorium. ISU dormitories can be seen in the distance between the two buildings.

=== Hilton Coliseum ===
Hilton Coliseum was named after Dr. James H. Hilton. Dr. Hilton was the president of Iowa State University who presented the idea for the Iowa State Center. Hilton Coliseum was completed in 1971 at a cost of $8.1 million. Hilton Coliseum can seat approximately 14,000 for athletic events and 15,000 for concerts. The first event in Hilton was an agriculture conference; the first athletic event was a men's basketball game between Iowa State and Arizona in which ISU won.

=== Fisher Theater ===
Fisher Theater was named for J. W. Fisher of Marshalltown, Iowa. J. W. Fisher was a major contributor to the university and the Iowa State Center. Fisher Theater was completed in 1974 at a cost of $900,000. The theater seats 454 and is mainly used by Iowa State student theater and dance groups.

=== Jack Trice Stadium ===
Jack Trice Stadium was completed in 1975 after two years of construction. The stadium was originally named Cyclone Stadium, but its name was changed in 1997 to honor the school's first African-American athlete and the only ISU athlete to die from injuries suffered while competing in an athletic event, Jack Trice. The first game played in the stadium was a Cyclone victory over Air Force in September 1975. The stadium is primarily used for NCAA college football, but has also been used for concerts.

=== Scheman Building ===
Scheman Building was named for Carl Scheman who was an ISU alumnus and a major contributor to the Iowa State Center. It was completed in 1975 at a cost $5.3 million and hosts small and large conferences, board meetings, pre-performance dinners, wedding receptions and much more.

The Scheman Building is also the site of the Brunnier Art Museum. It is the state's only accredited museum emphasizing a decorative arts collection, and one of the nation's few museums located within a performing arts and conference complex.

=== CyTown ===
In September 2019, Iowa State University announced its intent for a mixed use development facility in between Jack Trice Stadium and Hilton Coliseum, in the heart of the Iowa State Center. The initial plan had the entrance from University Avenue with the project heading west. The project that was approved by the Iowa Board of Regents in June 2022 and officially announced in September 2022 by the university has the project coming off Jack Trice Avenue heading north. McFarland Clinic agreed to become the first tenant of CyTown, with construction of their building currently underway. CyTown will also include a hotel between the Scheman Building and Hilton Coliseum dubbed 'The Cardinal.' The project is expected to be completed in time for the 2028 football season.
