= Seven Bridges =

Seven Bridges may refer to:

- Seven Bridges, Reading, a street named after a series of bridges over streams of the River Kennet
- Seven Bridges of Königsberg, a notable historical problem in mathematics
- Seven Bridges Road (album), a 1972 album by country rock musician Steve Young
  - "Seven Bridges Road", the album's title track, covered by The Eagles and others

== See also ==
- Severn Bridge (disambiguation)
