= Anne Catherine Hoof Green =

American journalist

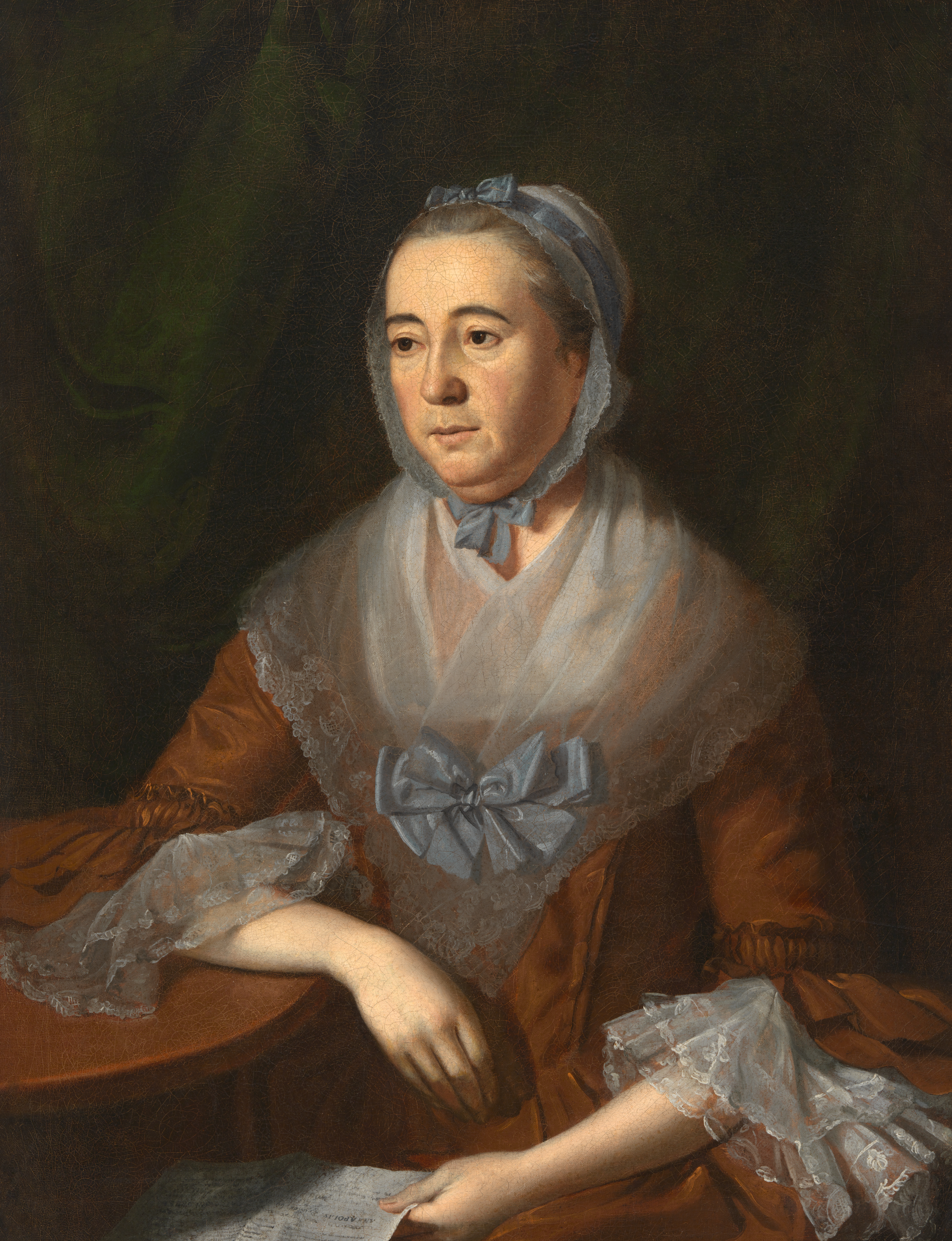
- Portrait by Charles Willson Peale, c. 1769
- Born: Netherlands
- Died: March 23, 1775 (aged 54–55)
- Occupations: Printer, publisher
- Known for: One of the first female publishers in the Colonies
- Notable work: Reviving the Maryland Gazette
- Spouse: Jonas Green

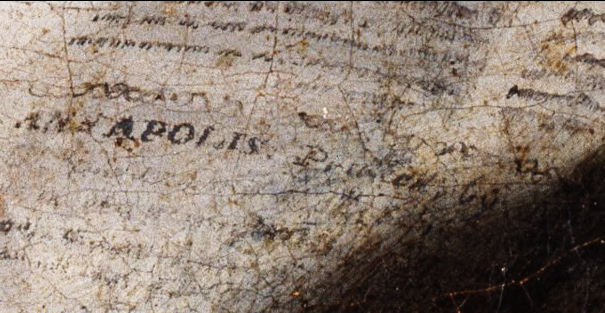
Detail of paper in above painting, showing the words "Annapolis printer to..." referring to her succeeding her husband as official printer of Maryland.

Anne Catherine Hoof Green (c. 1720 – March 23, 1775) was a printer and publisher in Maryland.

== Early life ==
Anne Hoof was most likely born in the Netherlands around 1720. She emigrated to Philadelphia with her parents sometime between 1720 and 1738. She married Jonas Green (c.1720-1767) at Christ's Church in Philadelphia on April 25, 1738, and had fourteen children, with six surviving infancy.

== The Maryland Gazette ==
In 1738, Anne and Jonas moved to Annapolis where they later revived the dormant Maryland Gazette in 1745. The Maryland Gazette was one of the first newspapers published in America and was the main source for news for Maryland colonists. In Annapolis, the Greens rented a small two-story house with a kitchen and two bedrooms, located at 124 Charles Street. During the early 1740s the owner of the house expanded it to contain a print shop, post office, and room for their 14 children. The Green family purchased the house in 1770.

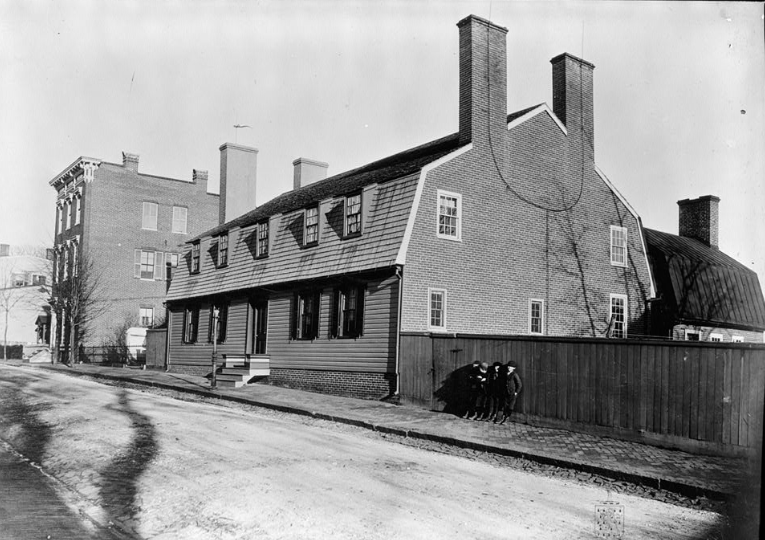
Jonas Green House, Annapolis

After the death of her husband on April 11, 1767, Anne Green took over production of the newspaper, becoming one of the first women publishers in the American colonies (preceded by Ann Smith Franklin of Rhode Island). In the April 16, 1767, edition, Anne Green announced that she would continue to publish the paper with her son.

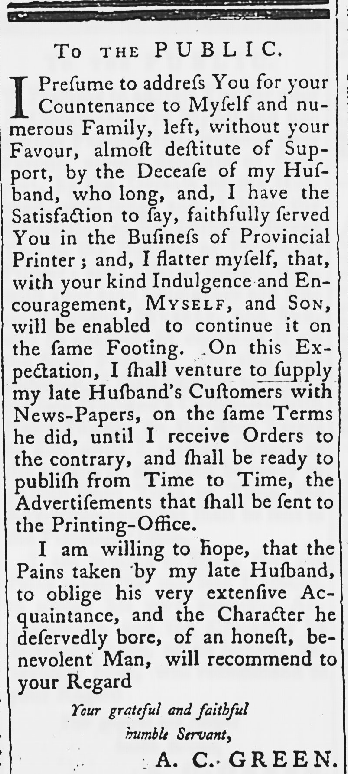
April 16, 1767, Maryland Gazette: announcement by Anne Green

She became the printer of the General Assembly after taking over her husband's contract. The Maryland Gazette continued to be critical of British colonial policies.

Green's portrait was painted by Charles Willson Peale in 1769. The words "Annapolis printer to..." appear on the paper she is holding in the portrait, referring to the Maryland legislature's choice of Anne to succeed her husband as the official printer of the Maryland colony. Under her guidance business thrived and Anne Green became one of the few women of her time to gain success in the male-dominated business world.

== See also ==
- List of women printers and publishers before 1800
