= Weems Creek =

Stream in Maryland, U.S.

Coordinates: 38.99042°N 76.51650°W

Weems Creek is a stream in the U.S. state of Maryland. It is a tributary to the Severn River.

Weems Creek is named after the Weems family, which settled near its course in the 1780s. A variant name is "Weem Creek".
