= Frederick Snare =

Contracting engineer (1862–1946)

- Born: Frederick Snare; December 4, 1862
- Died: September 27, 1946 (aged 83); Havana, Cuba
- Children: Frederick Snare Jr.
- Engineering career
- Practice name: Snare & Triest Company (1900-1920s); Frederick Snare Corporation (1920s)

Frederick Snare (December 4, 1862 – September 27, 1946) was an American engineer and international construction contractor.

== Career ==
After an unsuccessful contracting business in 1885 in Huntingdon, he relocated to Philadelphia and established a new contracting firm. Frederick Snare and Wolfgang Gustav Triest established the Snare & Triest Company in 1898. The Snare & Triest Company was incorporated in 1900, with Snare as the President. The Snare & Triest Company became the Frederick Snare Corporation in the 1920s. Snare's company operated in the United States, Cuba, Peru, Argentina, Columbia, and Panama. It grew to become one of Latin America's major contractual engineering firms.

The biggest project was Guri Dam in 1963, with another bigger companies as: Merrit Chapman & Scott, Morrison Knudsen, Kaiser Constructors and others.

In Havana, he constructed a country club after a group of American and British residents, led by Snare, arrived in 1911 and purchased an estate in Marianao. The original country club that Snare had established was renamed the Havana Biltmore Yacht and Country Club by the 1930s.

== Golf ==
In 1922 and 1925, he won the Seniors' Golf Championship, an annual tournament of the United States Seniors Golf Association. Snare was a member of the Garden City Golf Club and National Golf Links of America. In 1927, he captained the United States Expeditionary Golf Forces at the first annual triangular international tournament in England.

== Death ==
Frederick Snare died on September 22, 1946, at the Anglo-American Hospital in Havana, Cuba.
