= Hilton Coliseum =

Multi-purpose arena in Ames, Iowa, U.S.

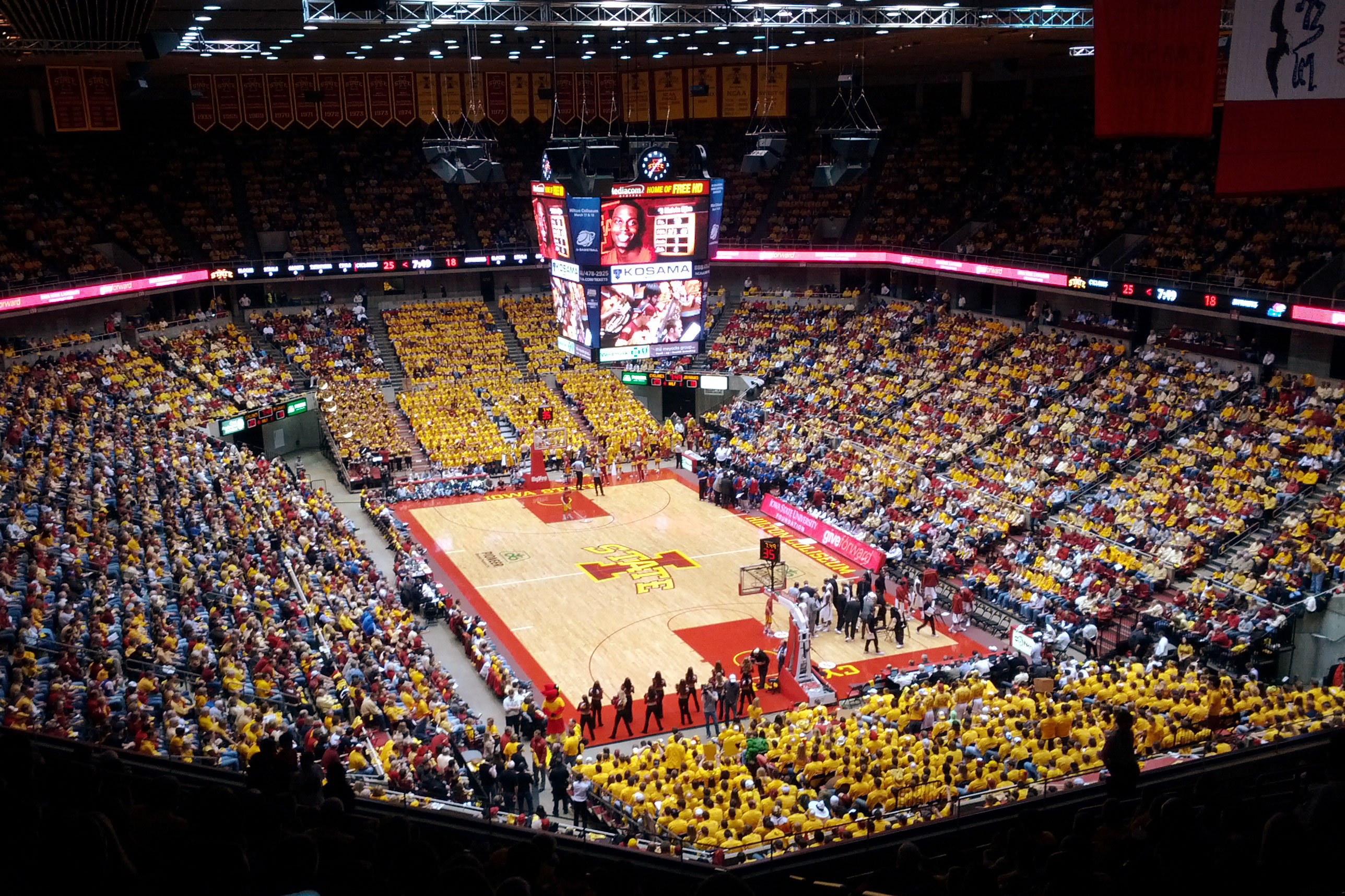
- Interactive map of Hilton Coliseum
- Location: Iowa State Center; Lincoln Way & University Boulevard; Ames, IA 50010
- Coordinates: 42.02101°N 93.634763°W
- Owner: Iowa State University
- Operator: ISU Athletic Department
- Capacity: 15,000+ (concerts); 14,267 (2021–present); 14,384 (2013–2020); 14,376 (2011–2013); 14,356 (2007–2011); 14,092 (1998–2007); 14,020 (1971–1998)
- Surface: Multi-surface

Construction
- Groundbreaking: June 16, 1968
- Opened: December 2, 1971
- Cost: $8.165 million ($64.9 million in 2025 dollars)
- Architects: Crites & McConnell; Brooks Borg & Skiles
- General contractors: James Thompson & Sons

Tenant
- Iowa State Cyclones (NCAA DI) (1971–present)

James H. Hilton Coliseum is a 14,267-seat multi-purpose arena located in Ames, Iowa, United States. The arena opened in 1971. It is home to the Iowa State University Cyclones men's and women's basketball teams, wrestling, gymnastics and volleyball teams.

== Overview ==
The building was constructed in 1971 as part of the Iowa State Center, an athletic and cultural events area located southeast of the main campus. The Coliseum was named after James H. Hilton, ISU's president from 1953 to 1965, who pushed for the construction of the facility. The Iowa State Center also includes Jack Trice Stadium, C.Y. Stephens Auditorium, Fisher Theater and Scheman Continuing Education Building. Hilton Coliseum and Jack Trice Stadium replaced the Iowa State Armory and Clyde Williams Stadium, at the corner of Union Dr. & Sheldon Ave. Hilton Coliseum was specifically built to hold in sound with a solid concrete structure, steel doors, and a crowd that sits just a few feet from the court.

The first band to ever perform at the Hilton Coliseum was Meloncolony, a band composed of Midwest natives: Chuck Vail (singer), Wayne Groff (organ), Matt Peterson (bass), Clint Dudley (guitar), and Bob Curtis (drums). The band performed at an event organized by the YMCA to both entertain and encourage 2,300 locals to register to vote. Of the 2,300, 200 people registered that night. Phish played the arena in both 1996 and 1999.

The arena hosted the 1972 NCAA basketball tournament Midwest Regionals, as well as the 1982, 1988 and 1993 NCAA wrestling championships. The arena is also the site of the annual Iowa All State Music Festival. It has also hosted commencements, concerts, conventions and other assemblies. A crowd of 15,000 saw the Cyclones post a 97-94 win over Iowa in 1971. Until Casey's Center in Des Moines was built, Hilton Coliseum was Central Iowa's primary entertainment venue.

== Hilton Magic ==
The Hilton Coliseum is described as having "Hilton Magic" that gave the Cyclones unexpected victories. It was first described by Des Moines Register sportswriter Buck Turnbull. On a Feb. 14, 1989, showdown with No. 3 Missouri, the Cyclones conjured up the spirit of the Hilton crowd to produce a stunning 82–75 victory. The following day’s headline read “Hilton Magic Spells ‘Upset’ One More Time.” In the article, Turnbull called for more “Hilton Magic” in the Cyclones’ upcoming bout with Oklahoma State, which had defeated ISU, 102–74, just three weeks earlier. The Cyclones defeated the Cowboys, 90–81, marking a 37-point reversal from the season’s prior meeting.

== Athletic events ==
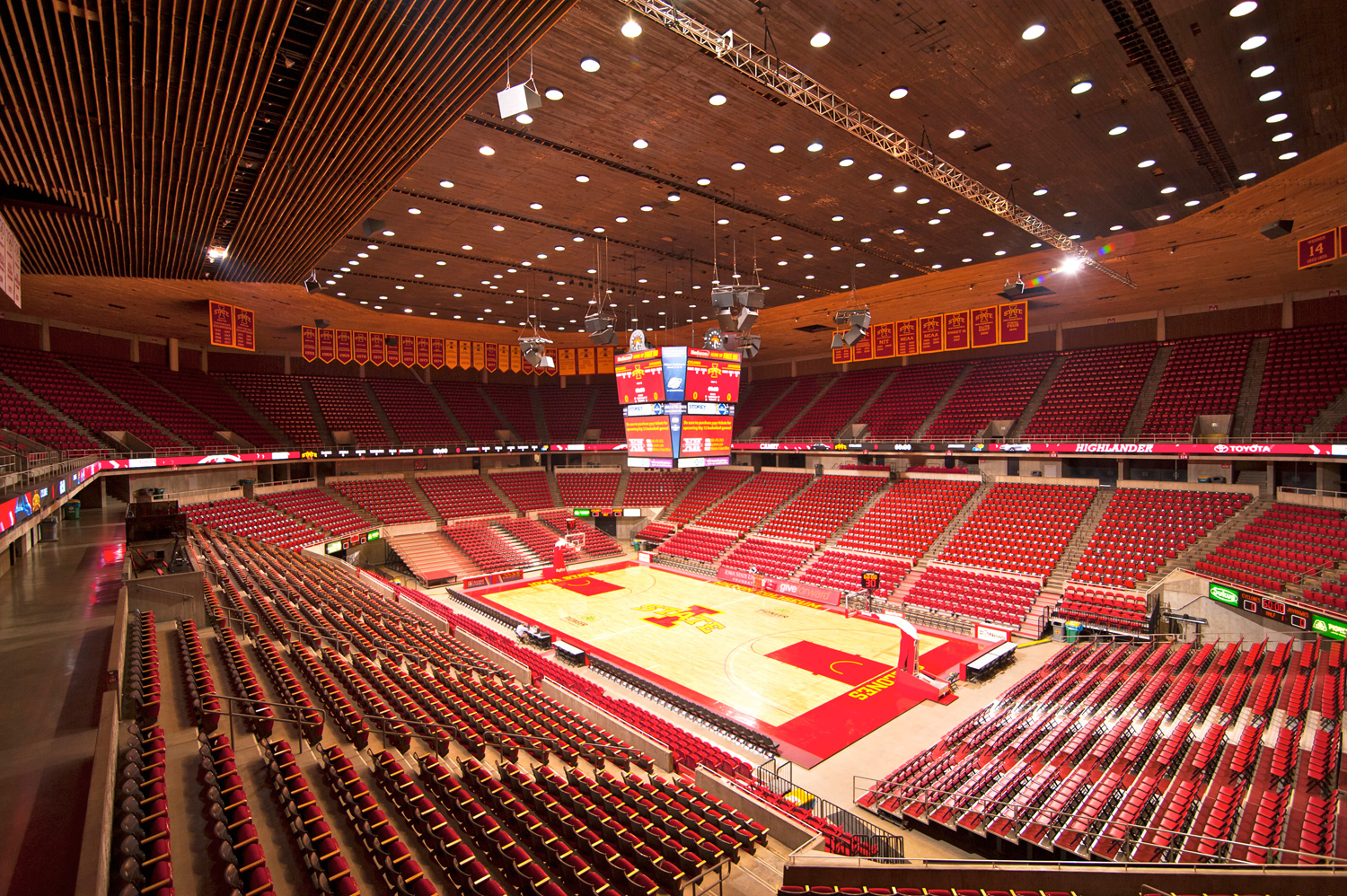
Hilton Coliseum interior

=== Basketball ===
==== Iowa State Cyclones ====
CBS SportsLine.com’s Dan Wetzel rated Hilton No. 10 on his list of the nation’s top college basketball arenas. Until the completion of the Sukup Practice Facility in the fall of 2009, both Cyclone squads held practices and games in the 14,384-seat arena. Both women's and men's teams continue to play home games at Hilton.

Hilton's facilities include dressing rooms for both the ISU women's and men's teams, additional rooms for visiting teams and officials, a weight room, training room, media room, and offices of the women's volleyball team. Men and women's basketball offices were relocated to the Sukup Practice Facility on its completion.

The Cyclones recorded the first women’s basketball sellout crowd when 14,092 attended the WNIT double-header in Hilton Coliseum on March 25, 2004. ISU defeated Saint Joseph's, 66–58, to advance to the WNIT Final Four.

On January 17, 2015, Hilton Coliseum hosted ESPN's College Gameday in front of roughly 7,000 fans. That evening, a sold-out Hilton saw the No. 11 Cyclones defeat No. 9 Kansas, 86–81.

==== High school basketball ====
Beginning in 2027, the Iowa High School Athletic Association boys' basketball championships will be held in Hilton Coliseum, making it the first venue outside of Des Moines to host the competition in over 60 years. The championships will remain at Hilton until at least 2031.

=== Hockey ===
One year after opening, Hilton Coliseum started hosting the Iowa State Cyclones Men's Hockey Team up until the mid-1980s. The Cyclones Men's & Women's Hockey Team later moved into the Ames/ISU Ice Arena in 2001.

The exact capacity for Ice Hockey games aren't listed online as of 2023, but according to founder, former player and coach of the ISU Men's Hockey Team Alan J Murdoch, the attendance for Men's Hockey games at Hilton Coliseum often exceeded just over 12,000 people.

Although the arena officially opened on December 2, 1971, the Cyclones' first Hockey game there didn't take place until March of 1972 due to ongoing construction issues. Dr. Murdoch and Vic Heyliger, a six-time NCAA National Champion head coach and member of the United States Hockey Hall of Fame, arranged for a weekend series that included the first game for ISU. According to Murdoch, 10 miles of piping were inserted into the arena's concrete floor to support an Ice rink.

=== Wrestling ===
The ISU wrestling program uses the Hilton Coliseum. The Iowa State wrestling program has hosted five NCAA Championship events in 1974, 1979, 1982, 1988 and 1993 and Hilton has been home to eight conference meets in 1976, 1979, 1983, 1986, 1994, 1999, 2004, and most recently in 2006.

=== Gymnastics ===
The Hilton Coliseum is home for the Iowa State gymnastics team, playing host to the 2000 Big 12 Championship and the 2006 NCAA Regional Meet.

=== Volleyball ===
The Iowa State volleyball team uses the Hilton Coliseum. The Cyclones hosted the NCAA First Round in 1995 at Hilton Coliseum. Iowa State also hosted NCAA First and Second Round games in 2009, 2011, and 2012.

== Concerts ==
- 38 Special
- Aerosmith
- Bad Company
- Beach Boys
- Billy Joel
- Billy Squire
- Bon Jovi
- Bruce Springsteen
- BulletBoys
- Bush
- Carol King
- Cheap Trick
- Cher
- Cinderella
- Commodores
- Def Leppard
- Disney on Ice
- Doobie Brothers
- Eagles
- Earth, Wind and Fire
- Elton John
- Elvis Presley
- Huey Lewis and The News
- Garth Brooks
- Genesis
- Guns and Roses
- Helen Reddy
- Ides of March
- INXS
- Its a Beautiful Day
- James Taylor
- Justin Timberlake
- Kenny Rogers and the First Edition 1974
- Kenny Rogers
- Kiss
- Lynard Skynard
- Martina McBride
- Mason Proffit
- Men At Work
- Metallica
- MC Hammer
- New York Philharmonic
- Olivia Newton-John
- Queen
- Queensryche
- R.E.M.
- Page & Plant
- Phish
- Prince
- The Smashing Pumpkins
- Stryper
- Sugarland
- Tesla
- Three Dog Night
- Tim McGraw 2002
- The Cult
- The Who
- Van Halen
- White Lion
- Winger
- ZZ Top

== Construction ==
=== Previous Construction ===
The arena received a new $2.5 million video and sound system in 2006. These improvements are just the beginning of the up $60 million in planned renovation and construction to the facility, over the next 10 years.

For the start of the 2016-2017 Men's Basketball season new blackout lighting was introduced that allows the stadium to be blacked out and then immediately resume normal lighting conditions. This allows them to provide special lighting sequences like when announcing players before a game starts.

As part of a larger partnership with Daktronics, in 2024 Hilton Coliseum upgraded its video capabilities featuring a new centerhung display. The new main video board offers a 360-degree view, with additional underbelly display boards, corner ribbon boards, and flexible LED scorer tables.

Hilton Coliseum was constructed in the flood plain of Ioway Creek. The Coliseum has been inundated with flood water in both 1993 and 2010, but its mostly concrete design simplifies restoring it to service after floods.

== See also ==
- List of NCAA Division I basketball arenas
