= Jonas Green =

Colonial American printer (died 1767)

Jonas Green (died 1767) was a colonial American printer and newspaper publisher together with his wife Anne Catherine Hoof Green in Maryland. He was a strong opponent of The Stamp Act.

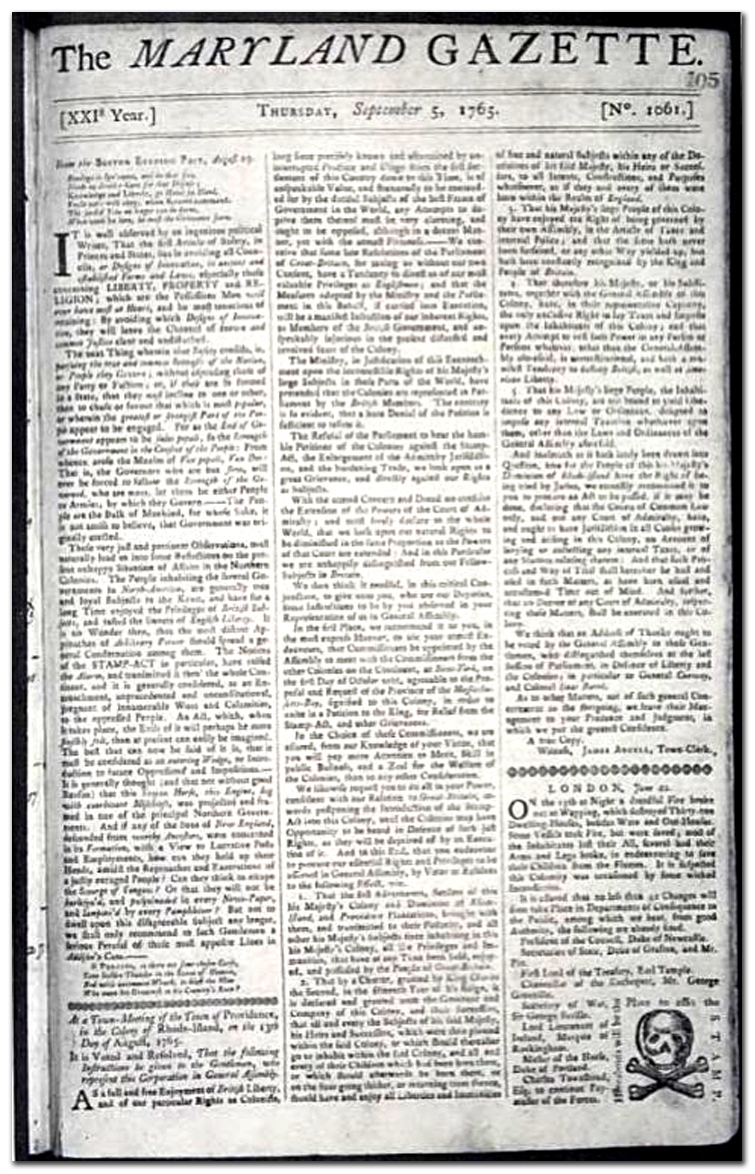
Maryland Gazette 5 Sept 1765. A skull and crossbones was displayed where the stamp should have been affixed.

== Early life ==
Green was born in Boston into a family of printers. He was the son of Timothy Green, who removed from Boston and settled at New London in 1714, and great-grandson of Samuel Green, another printer at Cambridge.

The family tradition was started in Massachusetts by his great-grandfather, Samuel Green, a successor to the earliest printers in the North American colonies, the Dayes of Cambridge. Samuel Green started his printing business in 1649 and produced a number of notable works, including Elliot's New Testament, translated into the Native American language.

== Career ==
Jonas Green moved to Maryland in 1738, and became the Province's official printer.

Green was a protégé of Benjamin Franklin in Philadelphia.

He became the publisher of the Maryland Gazette. Its early masthead read as follows:

"Annapolis, Printed by Jonas Green at his Printing Office on Charles Street; where all persons may be supplied with this Gazette at twelve shillings, six pence a year, and Advertisements of moderate length are inserted for 5 shillings the First Week and 1 shilling each time thereafter; and long ones in proportion."

Money was sometimes hard to come by, so Green sometimes traded an ad or a subscription for supplies. His wife, Anne Catharine Green, also helped to make ends meet by selling homemade chocolates at the post office.

=== The Maryland Gazette and the American Revolution ===
Green, a born troublemaker, hated the Stamp Act, which among other things directly taxed his newspaper. Refusing to pay, he published the Gazette with what was then a blaring headline: "The Maryland Gazette Expiring: In Uncertain Hopes of a Resurrection to Life Again." Green wrote that because of the Stamp Act, the newspaper "will not any longer be published." In the bottom right-hand corner of the page, where the tax stamp should have been placed, there appeared instead a skull and crossbones. Calmer heads persuaded Green to return to publishing as part of the struggle against tyranny, and he later resumed publication under this banner headline: "An Apparition of the late Maryland Gazette, which is not dead, but only sleepeth." Defenders of this newspaper's claim as "the oldest in the nation" say this brief interruption of publication was not a business decision as much as a deliberate political statement by a determined and courageous publisher.

Green is generally known for his printing of Bacon's Laws of Maryland and for reviving Parks' newspaper, the Maryland Gazette.

When Green died in 1767, his jobs as editor and publisher were taken over by his wife, Anne Catherine Hoof Green, making her the first woman to hold either of the top jobs at an American newspaper. A strong supporter of Colonial rights, she continued her husband's policy of operating an independent newspaper under the nose of the royal governor in Annapolis. Ultimately, she published the newspaper for eight years while raising 14 children. The newspaper stayed in the Green family for 94 years.

== Legacy ==
Jonas Green's house, where the Gazette was published for many years, still stands on Charles Street in downtown Annapolis, marked by a small historical plaque.

Jonas Green Park is a former Maryland state park now owned and operated by Anne Arundel County. Located on the Severn River in Annapolis at 2001 Baltimore Annapolis Blvd., at the end of the Baltimore & Annapolis Trail, it was established on June 6, 2009, and offers a visitors center, a cartop boat launch site, environmental plantings, and a fishing pier. In November 2018 the park was renamed the Jonas and Anne Catharine Green Park.

== Bibliography ==
- Thomas, Isaiah (1874). The history of printing in America, with a biography of printers. Vol. I. New York, B. Franklin.
- Wroth, Lawrence C. (1922). A History of Printing in Colonial Maryland, 1686–1776. Baltimore : Typothetae of Baltimore.
- "The Green Family of Printers". A History of Printing in Maryland: Selections From The Marylandia Collection. University of Maryland Special Collections. Archived from the original on 22 August 2012.
