= Maryland Gazette =

Newspaper

- Type: Daily newspaper
- Format: Broadsheet
- Founder(s): William Parks; Jonas Green
- Founded: September 1727; 298 years ago (as The Maryland Gazette)
- Website: capitalgazette.com/tag/maryland-gazette

The Gazette, founded in 1727 as The Maryland Gazette, is one of the oldest newspapers in America. Its modern-day descendant, The Capital, was acquired by The Baltimore Sun Media Group in 2014. Previously, it was owned by the Capital Gazette Communications group, which published The Capital, Bowie Blade-News, Crofton-West County Gazette, and Capital Style Magazine.

The Gazette and their sister publications have been composed and printed in numerous locations, all in the Annapolis area, for more than 270 years. The company has moved headquarters seven times, including from 3 Church Circle to 213 West St. in 1948, to 2000 Capital Drive in 1987 and to Bestgate Road in September 2014.

As of 2021, the newspaper posts to its website daily and publishes print editions on Wednesdays and Sundays.

== 18th century ==
=== William Parks ===
The Maryland Gazette was founded in Annapolis, Maryland in 1727 and published through 1734 by William Parks. Parks moved to Virginia in 1736. The newspaper was both Maryland and the South's first publication, as well as the sixth in the colonies. Publication became irregular after 1730, before being discontinued in 1734.

The Gazette began as a half folio sheet with double columns printed on both sides. Parks modelled his format after British weekly papers such as the Spectator or the Tattler. It later expanded to full folio, presenting four pages with essays, news, and advertisements.

=== Jonas Green ===
The Gazette's second publisher was Jonas Green, a former protégé of Benjamin Franklin in Philadelphia. On January 17, 1745, he revived the weekly paper, distributing it at the post office and printing office on Charles Street. The Gazette's early masthead read as follows:

"Annapolis, Printed by Jonas Green at his Printing Office on Charles Street; where all persons may be supplied with this Gazette at twelve shillings, six pence a year, and Advertisements of moderate length are inserted for 5 shillings the First Week and 1 shilling each time thereafter; and long ones in proportion."

Money was sometimes hard to come by, so Green sometimes traded an ad or a subscription for supplies. His wife, Anne Catherine Hoof Green, also helped to make ends meet by selling homemade chocolates at the post office.

Jonas Green was known as a "wit and bon vivant" for his "mystifying conundrums and atrocious puns".

Jonas Green spoke out against the Stamp Tax frequently, giving weekly notices of the tax, speeches made against it, and its enactment. Contributors to the paper wrote under the pseudonyms "Cato" and "Lycurgus," calling the tax impolitic and unconstitutional. Green publicly stated that he would suspend publication rather than submit to the tax, and on October 10, 1765, the Gazette printed an announcement of the cease in publication:

"THE MARYLAND GAZETTE, EXPIRING,

IN UNCERTAIN HOPES

Of a Resurrection to Life again."

=== Anna Catherine Hoof Green ===
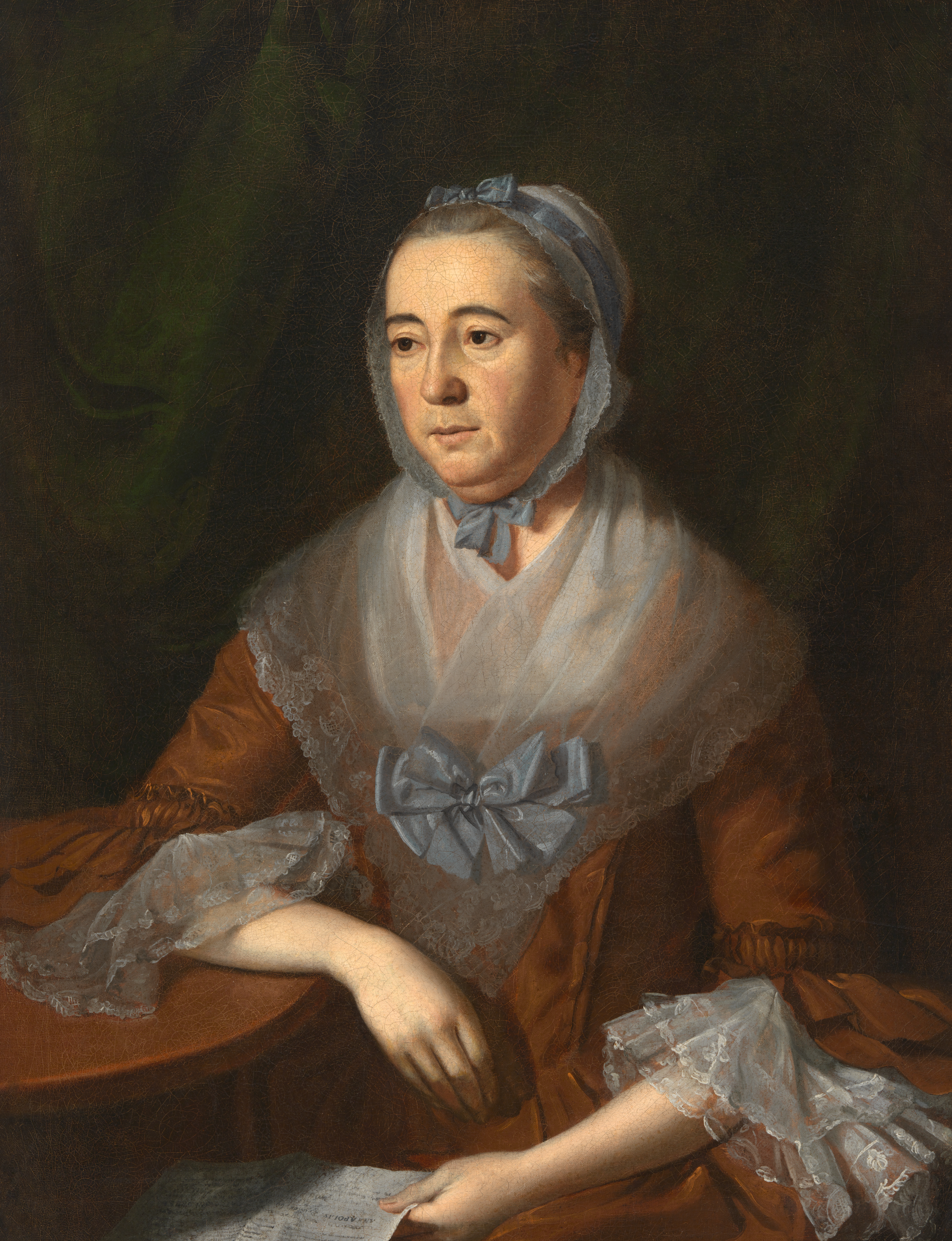
Anne Catharine Hoof Green - portrait by Charles Willson Peale

When Green died in 1767, his jobs as editor and publisher were taken over by his wife, Anne Catherine Hoof Green, making her one of the first women to hold either of the top jobs at an American newspaper (preceded by Ann Smith Franklin of Rhode Island). A strong supporter of Colonial rights, she continued her husband's policy of operating an independent newspaper under the nose of the royal governor in Annapolis. Ultimately, she published the newspaper for eight years while raising 14 children. The newspaper remained in the Green family for 94 years. The Green House on Charles Street in Annapolis, publication site of the Maryland Gazette, now bears a commemorative historical plaque.

=== American Revolution ===
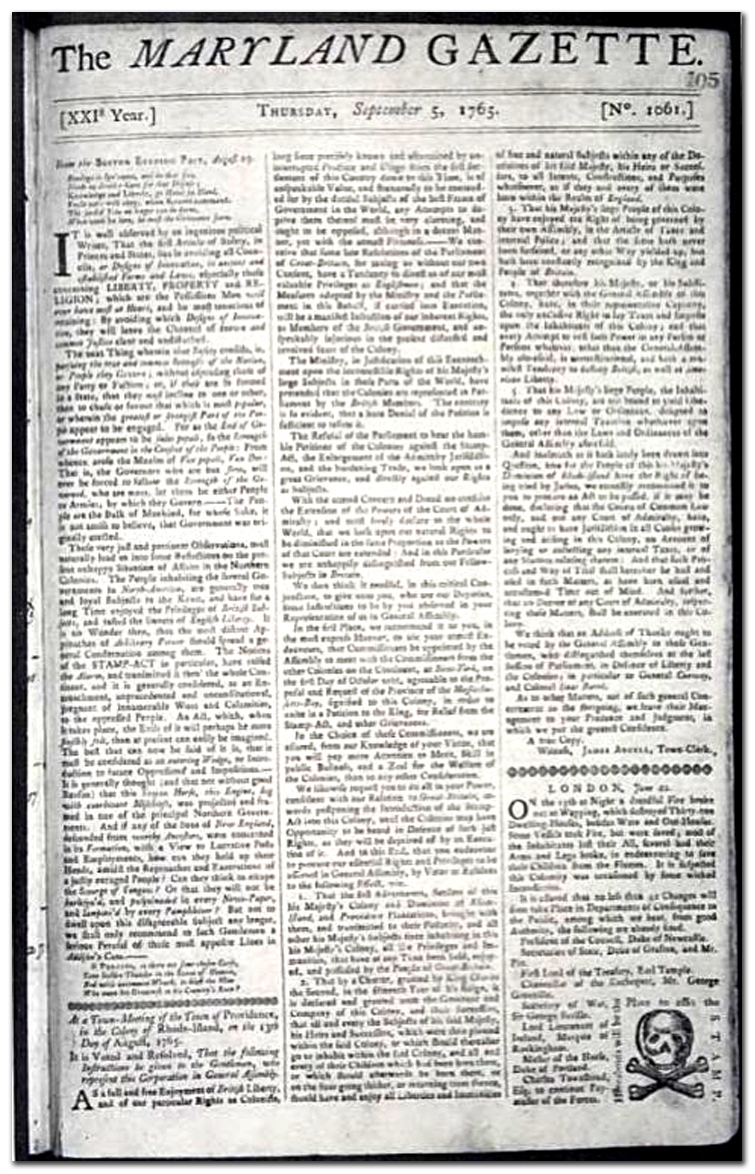
Maryland Gazette September 5, 1765. A skull and crossbones was displayed where the stamp should have been affixed.

Jonas Green hated the Stamp Act, which among other things directly taxed his newspaper. Refusing to pay, he published the Gazette with what was then a blaring headline: "The Maryland Gazette Expiring: In Uncertain Hopes of a Resurrection to Life Again." Green wrote that because of the Stamp Act, the newspaper "will not any longer be published." In the bottom right-hand corner of the page, where the tax stamp should have been placed, there appeared instead a skull and crossbones. Calmer heads persuaded Green to return to publishing as part of the struggle against tyranny, and he later resumed publication under this banner headline: "An Apparition of the late Maryland Gazette, which is not dead, but only sleepeth." Defenders of this newspaper's claim as "the oldest in the nation" say this brief interruption of publication was not a business decision as much as a deliberate political statement by a determined and courageous publisher.

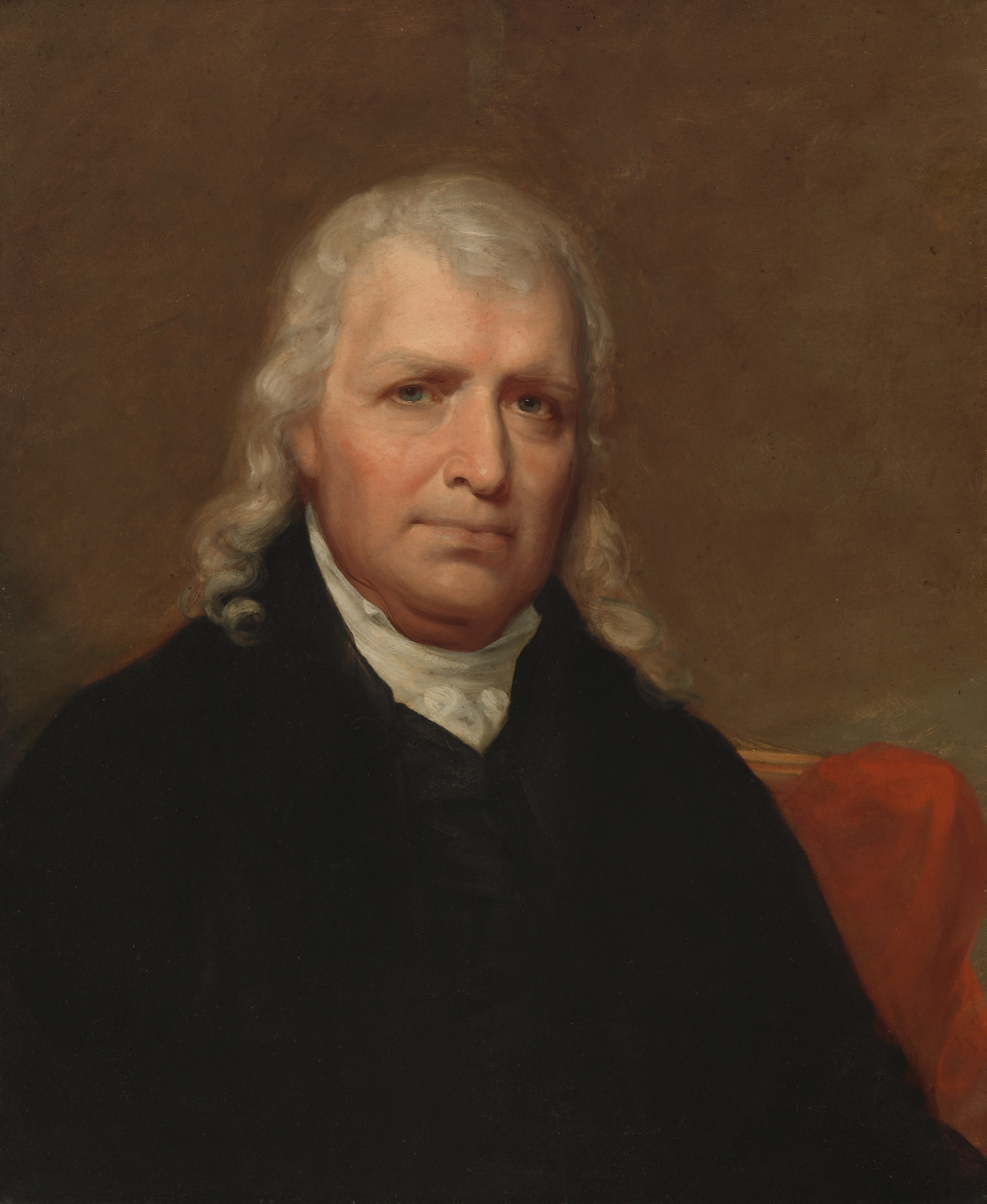
The opponents of Samuel Chase described him as "a foul-mouthed and flaming son of discord" in The Maryland Gazette.

In 1766, the Maryland Gazette was one of the venues for a war of words between a future signer of the Declaration of Independence and several loyalist members of the Annapolis political establishment. In the Maryland Gazette Extraordinary of June 19, 1766, Walter Dulany, George Steuart (1700–1784), John Brice (1705–1766) and others published an article excoriating Samuel Chase, co-founder of the Anne Arundel County chapter of the Sons of Liberty and a leading opponent of the 1765 Stamp Act. The article called Chase "a busy, reckless incendiary, a ringleader of mobs, a foul-mouthed and inflaming son of discord and faction, a common disturber of the public tranquility". Chase responded with an open letter accusing Steuart and the others of "vanity...pride and arrogance", and of being brought to power by "proprietary influence, court favour, and the wealth and influence of the tools and favourites who infest this city."

In 1772, Charles Carroll of Carrollton engaged in a debate conducted through the Maryland Gazette, maintaining the right of the colonies to control their own taxation. Writing in the Gazette under the pseudonym "First Citizen", he became a prominent spokesman against the governor's proclamation increasing legal fees to state officers and Protestant clergy. Opposing Carroll in these written debates and writing as "Antillon" was Daniel Dulany the Younger, a noted lawyer and loyalist politician. In these debates, Carroll argued that the government of Maryland had long been the monopoly of four families, the Ogles, the Taskers, the Bladens and the Dulanys, with Dulany taking the contrary view. Eventually word spread of the true identity of the two combatants, and Carroll's fame and notoriety began to grow. Dulany soon resorted to highly personal ad hominem attacks on "First Citizen", and Carroll responded, in statesmanlike fashion, with considerable restraint, arguing that when Antilles engaged in "virulent invective and illiberal abuse, we may fairly presume, that arguments are either wanting, or that ignorance or incapacity know not how to apply them".

== 19th century ==
=== Civil War ===
After the Civil War began and martial law was imposed on Maryland, thousands of Marylanders were imprisoned, including thirty members of the Annapolis-based Maryland General Assembly. Despite the First Amendment, the crackdown did not spare the press. Nine Maryland newspapers were suppressed temporarily or permanently, and at least a dozen newspaper owners and editors were locked up at Fort McHenry. The Maryland Gazette opted for survival, despite the known sympathies of Annapolis and Anne Arundel County for the South. In 1860, for example, Lincoln received only three votes in Anne Arundel County, and only a single one from Annapolis. However, any loss of revenue from disgruntled readers and advertisers was at least partially compensated for when President Abraham Lincoln appointed the publisher federal paymaster for the state of Maryland.

== 20th and 21st centuries ==
The Gazette merged with the Evening Capital after being purchased from Colonel Phillip E. Porter by Capital owner William Abbott in 1910. The newspaper was promoted to twice-weekly publication in 1969 and primarily covered the north county area.

== See also ==
- Early American publishers and printers
- Newspapers of colonial America
