= Willard Gustav Triest =

American civil engineer (1905–1989)

Willard G. Triest
- Born: Willard Gustav Triest; 1905; New York City, United States
- Died: June 22, 1989 (aged 83); Annapolis, Maryland, United States
- Spouse: Laura Wolcott Tuckerman
- Children: Laura Wolcott Triest
- Father: Wolfgang Gustav Triest
- Engineering career
- Practice name: Triest Construction Company; Triest Lumber Co. Snead & Triest
- Projects: Severn River Bridge
- Military career
- Branch: United States Navy
- Service years: 1941–1945
- Rank: Captain
- Conflicts: World War II
- Awards: Bronze Star Medal

Willard Gustav Triest (1905 – June 22, 1989) was an American civil engineer.

== Early life and education ==
Willard Gustav Triest was born in 1905 in New York City.

He was born into an engineering family, as his father, Wolfgang Gustav Triest, and maternal grandfather were involved in the Brooklyn Bridge construction. His father worked in heavy construction with the Triest Construction Company in New York.

W. G. Triest was a 1923 graduate of the Hill School in Pottstown, Pennsylvania. He pursued further education at Rensselaer Polytechnic Institute in Troy, New York between 1923 and 1926.

== Career ==
He began working at the Triest Contracting Corporation in 1926, rising from vice president to president of the New York construction firm founded by his father. Willard Triest launched the Triest Construction Company in the late 1930s, completing subway sections for the Independent Subway System and contributing to the Queens–Midtown Tunnel and Merriman Dam projects.

Triest entered the Civil Engineer Corps of the United States Navy in 1941, serving five years commanding battalion and regiment units. He was deployed to the South West Pacific theatre as executive officer of the 57th Naval Construction Battalion stationed on Espiritu Santo. In 1943, he took command of the 27th Naval Battalion, serving on Tulagi, Guadalcanal, Emirau, and Okinawa. For his contributions during the Battle of Okinawa, he received the Bronze Star Medal and ended his military career as a captain in 1945.

He moved to Annapolis, Maryland in 1950 from New York City to work on the Severn River Bridge. In Annapolis, he established the engineering firm of Snead & Triest.

Triest became vice president of the Annapolis-based Hydrasearch Co., where he oversaw research and development of hydraulic systems used in power plants. He also headed Triest Manufacturing Works, a firm that helped develop the U.S. Navy's at-sea refueling system. He retired from Hydrasearch in 1986.

== Death ==
Willard Gustav Triest died at 83 years old on June 19, 1989, in Annapolis, Maryland, United States. On June 23, 1989, his funeral service took place at St. Anne's Episcopal Church.
