= Wolfgang Gustav Triest =

Prussian-American civil engineer (1863–1946)

W.G. Triest
- Born: Wolfgang Gustav Triest; 1863; Oppeln, Prussia
- Died: September 21, 1946 (aged 82–83); Mineola, New York, U.S.
- Education: Royal Technical College in Berlin
- Spouses: Lucy Wood (m. 1894; died 1899); Lillie Macdonald (m. 1901)
- Children: Willard Gustav Triest; Gustav Kenneth Triest; Carl Gunther Triest
- Engineering career
- Practice name: Snare & Triest Company; Triest Construction Company

Wolfgang Gustav Triest (1863 – September 21, 1946) was an Prussian-American civil engineer. He was the founder of the Triest Construction Company in New York, and had homes in Annapolis, Maryland, and Southampton, Long Island.

== Early life ==
Wolfgang Gustav Triest, also known as W. G. Triest, was born in 1863 in Oppeln, Prussia.

== Career ==
Triest came to the United States in 1888 and began his career working for the Passaic Steel Company in Paterson, New Jersey. He then served as the primary assistant to Alfred P. Boller from 1890 until 1895.

In 1898, Frederick Snare and W.G. Triest founded the Snare & Triest Company. The Snare & Triest Company was incorporated in 1900. The Snare & Triest Company was renamed the Frederick Snare Corporation Contracting Engineers in the early 1920s. Around 1921, Snare and Triest agreed to part ways. He continued in heavy construction under the firm, Triest Contracting Corporation, subway and bridge builders of New York.

Triest was involved in the construction of the Brooklyn Bridge. His company also built part of the subway tunnel on the IND line, part of the Queens–Midtown Tunnel, and the cutoff wall of Merriman Dam in Wawarsing, New York.

== Death ==
W.G. Triest died on September 21, 1946 in Mineola, New York. He was a resident of Great Neck, New York at the time of his death.
