= Frank E. Shipley =

Maryland Senator

- Born: 1891
- Died: 1971 (aged 79–80); Anne Arundel County Hospital
- Occupations: Doctor, Senator
- Political party: Democratic

Frank E. Shipley (1891 – April 1971) was a Maryland state senator from 1955 to 1962.

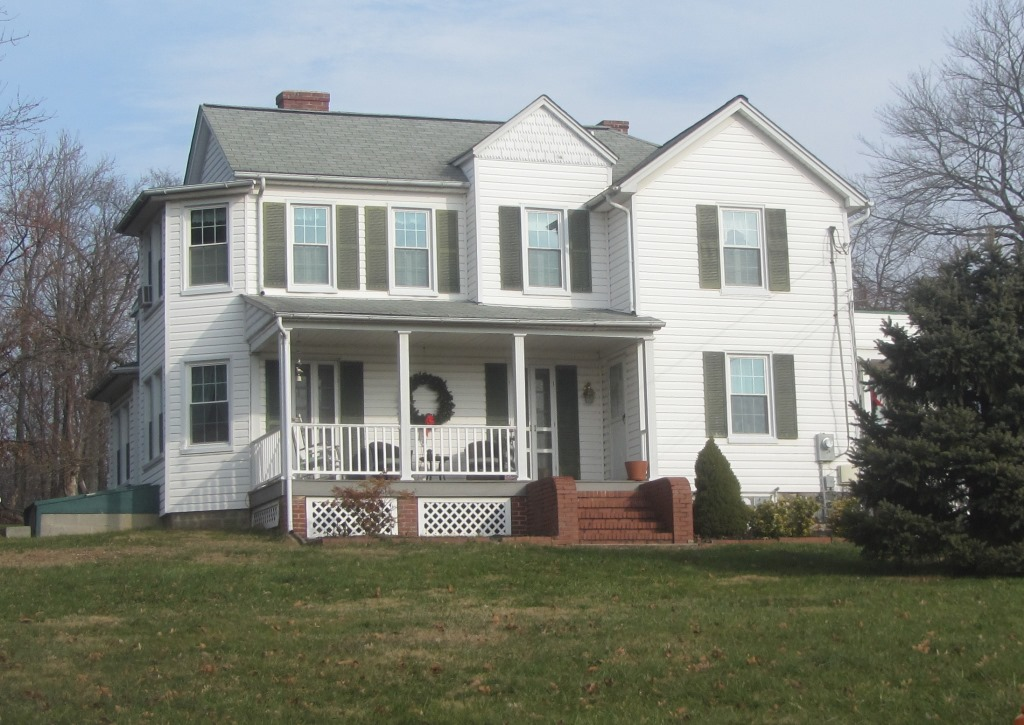
Frank Shipley House - Savage, Maryland

In 1885, the owners of the Savage Mill leased their house in Savage, Maryland to Frank Shipley's family. Shipley became a general practicing doctor. During World War I, he served in the Army Medical Corps. From 1932-1948 he was the treasurer of Howard County. In 1962, Shipley bypassed the state schoolboard nominating commission recommendation of Fred Schoenbrodt, and installed C.Y. Stephens. In 1971, the Savage Masonic Hall was redecorated as a memorial to Shipley.

== Biography ==
Frank E. Shipley,

== See also ==
- Savage, Maryland
