= High's Dairy Store =

US gas station and convenience store chain

High's of Baltimore, LLC
- Trade name: High's
- Formerly: High's Ice Cream (1928–1941)
- Type: Private
- Industry: Convenience store; Fast food; Gas station
- Founded: 1928; 98 years ago
- Founder: L.W. High
- Headquarters: Baltimore, Maryland, U.S.
- Number of locations: 60
- Area served: Baltimore metropolitan area
- Products: Prepared food; Beverages; Fuel
- Website: https://www.highs.com/

High's of Baltimore, LLC, doing business as High's, is a chain of gas stations and convenience stores in and around Baltimore, Maryland. As of 2022, the chain has 60 locations, the majority of which are in Maryland, plus three in Delaware. At one time, High's was the largest ice cream store in the world with over 500 stores, including locations in Virginia, Delaware, West Virginia, and Washington, D.C.

== History ==
The original iteration of High's was High's Ice Cream, an ice cream parlor founded by L.W. High in Richmond, Virginia in 1928 and purchased by James R. High Jr. with two partners in 1938, at which time there were 16 stores and an ice cream plant in Richmond. In 1941, Convenient Systems, Inc. of Winston-Salem, North Carolina purchased the chain, then numbering 50 stores. Gregory remained at the helm until 1976. The company was acquired by the Capital Milk Producers Cooperative, who grew the chain to 350 High's Dairy Stores and Restaurants, and sold the Virginia and West Virginia stores in 1987 to Southland Corporation, who converted many of them to 7-Eleven stores, and closed the rest.

Fuel at High's gas stations was previously supplied by Shell and Citgo. High's first made a foray into proprietary fuel branding in 2011, when it was rolled out at a prototype station in Chester, Maryland. On March 1, 2012, High's, then based in Hanover, Maryland, was acquired by the Carroll Independent Fuel Company. Following the Carroll deal, most High's stores broke their ties with Shell and Citgo, began selling High's-branded fuel supplied by Carroll, and underwent remodels. Some High's locations continue to sell Shell-branded fuel. High's is now based in Carroll's Baltimore headquarters.

== Ice cream ==
The right to produce High's brand of ice cream was sold in 1989 to Kay's Ice Cream, based in Knoxville, Tennessee (which was subsequently acquired by C. F. Sauer Company in 1990). Until 2010 there was a High's Ice Cream parlor remaining in Portsmouth, Virginia, but it sold Hershey's brand ice cream. At the time of its closing, it still had the original High's interior (though showing its age) including the white and black checkerboard floor tiles that High's Ice Cream stores were known for. High's still sells its own brand of ice cream in quart sized containers, along with several selections of hand dipped varieties.
