= Severn River (Maryland) =

River in Maryland, United States

Coordinates: 38°58′13″N 76°27′43″W

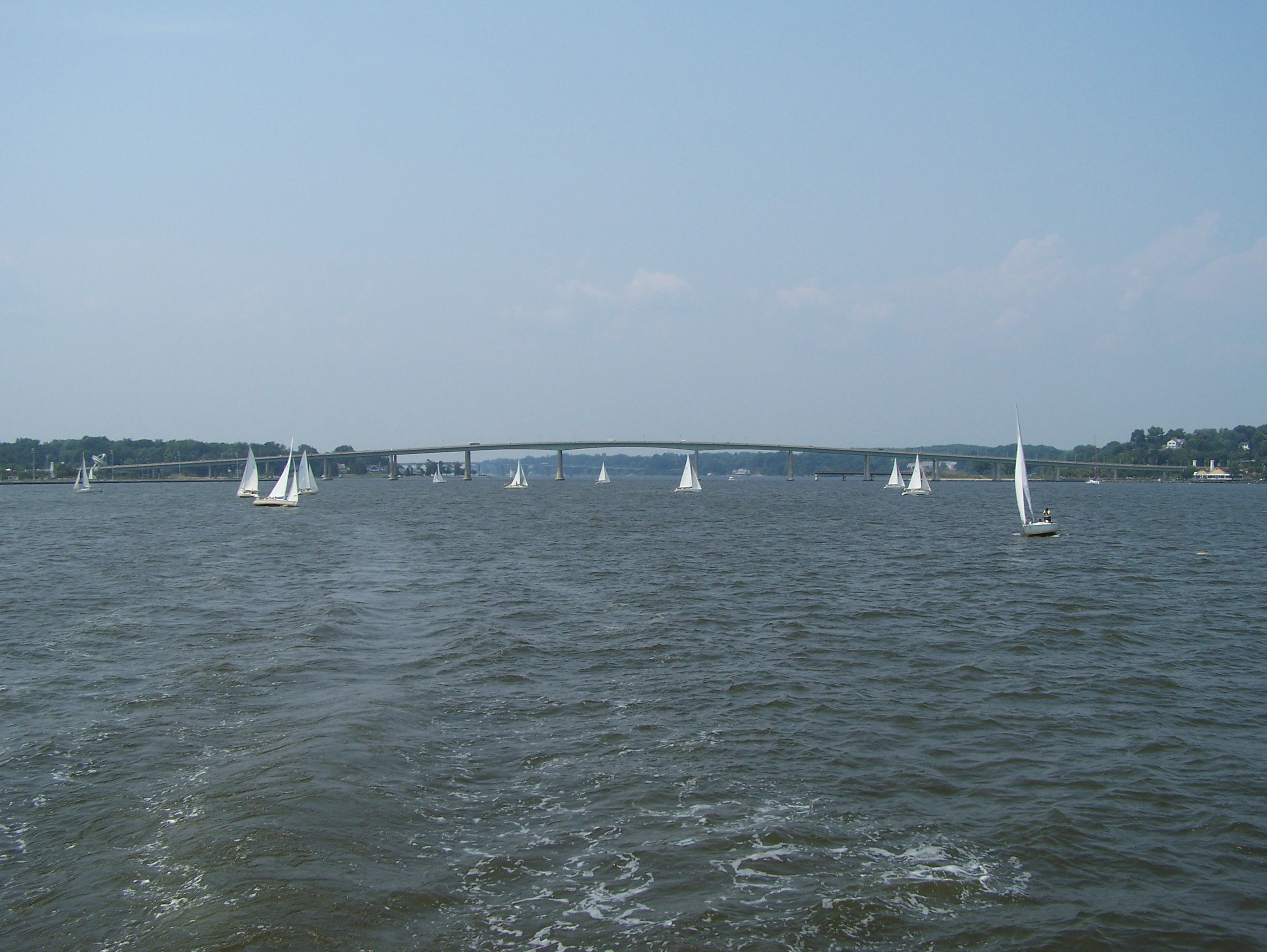
- Severn River with the Naval Academy Bridge in the distance

Location
- Country: United States
- State: Maryland
- Cities: Annapolis, Arnold, Severna Park, Crownsville, Millersville

Physical characteristics
- Source
  - location: Severn, Maryland
- Mouth: Chesapeake Bay
  - elevation: 0 ft (0 m)

Basin features
- Tributaries
  - right: Weems Creek, Spa Creek

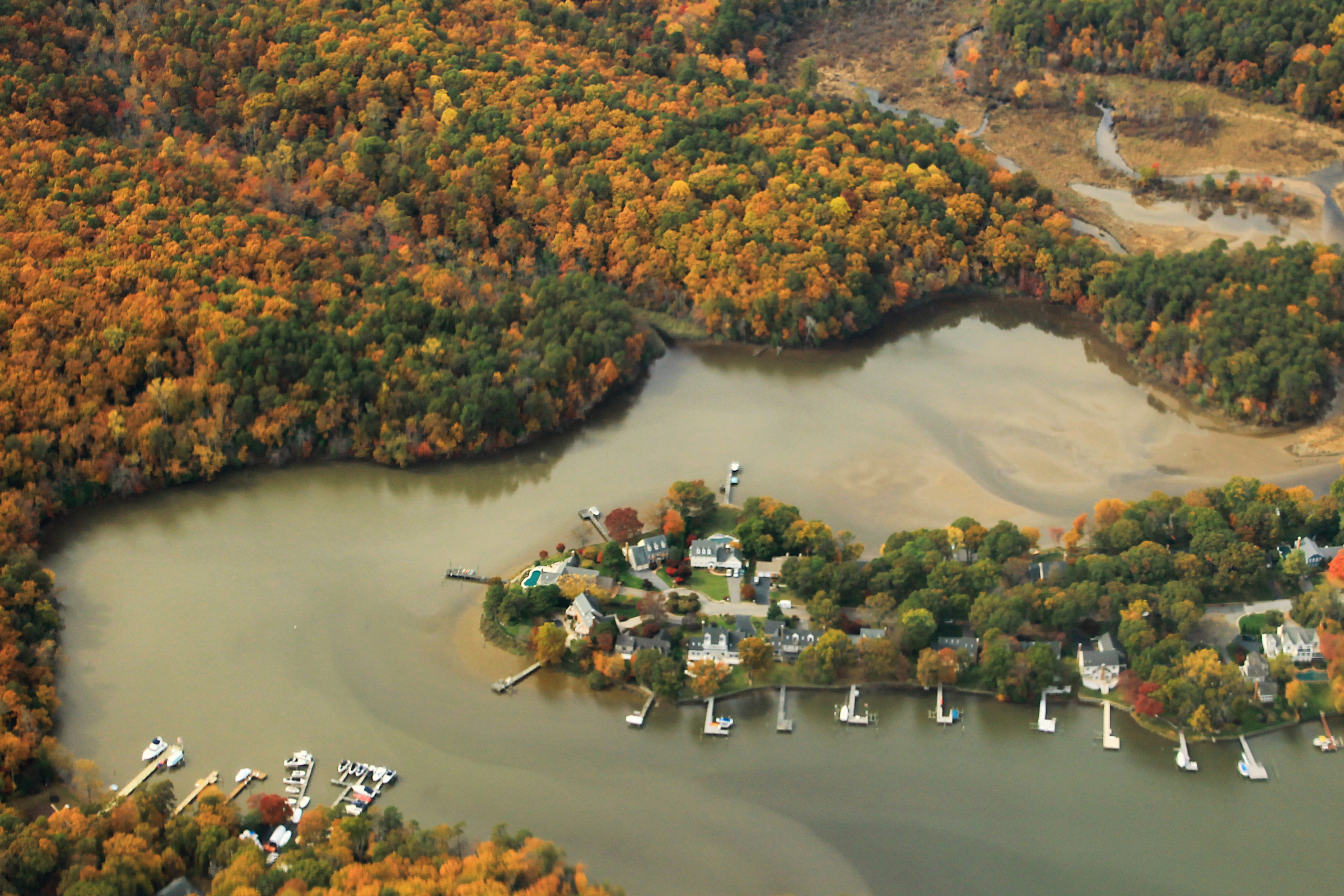
Start of the Severn River

The Severn River is a tidal estuary 14 miles (23 km) long, located in Anne Arundel County in the U.S. state of Maryland, south of the Magothy River and north of the South River.

== Human history ==
Providence, the first colonial settlement in Anne Arundel County, was founded in the fall and winter of 1649–1650 at the beginning of a mass migration of a group of Puritans and non-conformists from Lower Norfolk County in Virginia to primarily the north side of the mouth of the Severn. It faded away after the 1680s when Annapolis came into favor and, in 1694, became Maryland's capital. This "lost town" of Providence was originally thought to be limited to the Carr Creek and Greenbury Point area across the river from Annapolis on what are now the grounds of Naval Station Annapolis (renamed North Severn Complex.) More recent archaeological research has uncovered homes of this scattered settlement further to the north and northeast as well, on the southern half of the Broadneck Peninsula, especially near Whitehall Creek.

== Geography ==
The Severn has a watershed area (including the water surface) of 81 square miles (210 km^{2}), or 69 square miles (180 km^{2}) of land. Thus, its total watershed area is 15% water. Its source is the beginning of the non-tidal nine-mile long Severn Run in northwestern Anne Arundel County in Severn, Maryland. The river enters the Chesapeake Bay near the major port city of Annapolis, also the capital of Maryland. Most famous for the United States Naval Academy campus situated at the mouth of the river, the Severn provides an access point to the Chesapeake Bay not just for midshipmen but also for fishermen and pleasure boaters. Several tributary creeks drain highly developed areas, including Weems Creek and its nontidal portion Cowhide Branch, which drain most of the Annapolis Mall and the Anne Arundel Medical Center.

The Severn River is crossed by two bridges. One, known as the Severn River Bridge or Pearl Harbor Memorial Bridge, carries US 50/US 301/MD 2 and was first built in 1886. The other carries MD 450, and is now officially named the "US Naval Academy Bridge" because its south end traverses the academy. The latter bridge was built as a drawbridge in the late 1920s and replaced with the current high span in 1994. A former railroad trestle between the two current bridges, built in about 1887 for the Annapolis and Baltimore Short Line Railroad (which became part of the Washington, Baltimore and Annapolis Electric Railway), was removed post-1968 when it was declared unsafe.

On the northshore from Annapolis is the communities of St. Margaret's adjacent to the colonial plantation of Whitehall.

== Tributaries ==
If a tributary has sub-tributaries (commonly the upper, nontidal portion) below, they are listed after the "&".

North Shore (Upriver to downriver)

- Pointfield Branch
- Bear Branch
- Cold Spring Branch (Cool Spring Branch)
- Chartwell Branch
- Stevens Creek & Lake Liberty
- Rock Cove
- Forked Creek & Sacketts Pond
- Yantz Creek (Yantz Cove) & Cedar Creek
- Sullivan Cove
- Ringgold Cove
- Asquith Creek (Aisquith Creek)
- Rays Pond
- Chase Creek (Timberneck Creek)
- Cool Spring Cove (or Creek)
- Winchester Pond (Crouchs Pond)
- Manresa Pond (Browns Cove or Pond)
- Woolchurch Cove & Pond
- Carr Creek

South Shore (Upriver to downriver)

- Sewell Spring Branch
- Indian Creek & Indian Creek Branch
- Cypress Branch
- Arden Pond
- Plum Creek & Gumbottom Branch
- Valentine Creek
- Old Place Creek (Fox Creek)
- Browns Cove (on Little Round Bay)
- Maynadier Creek & Deep Ditch Branch
- Hopkins Creek & Davids Run
- Brewer Pond & Arthurs Run
- Brewer Creek & Howards Branch
- Clements Creek & Hockley Branch
- Saltworks Creek & Cabin Branch
- Martins Pond (Whitehurst Lake)
- Luce Creek & Howard Creek
- Cove of Cork
- Weems Creek & Cowhide Branch
- Shady Lake
- College Creek (Dorsey Creek) & Peters Cove
- Spa Creek (Spaw Creek, Carrols Creek) & Acton Cove, Hawkins Cove
- Back Creek
- Lake Ogleton

== Severn River area publications and forums ==
- Annapolis Forum: Electronic Discussion for Annapolis MD Area Folk
- The Capital Newspaper Environment section for Severn River and Chesapeake Bay
