= Naval Academy Bridge =

U.S. Naval Academy Bridge
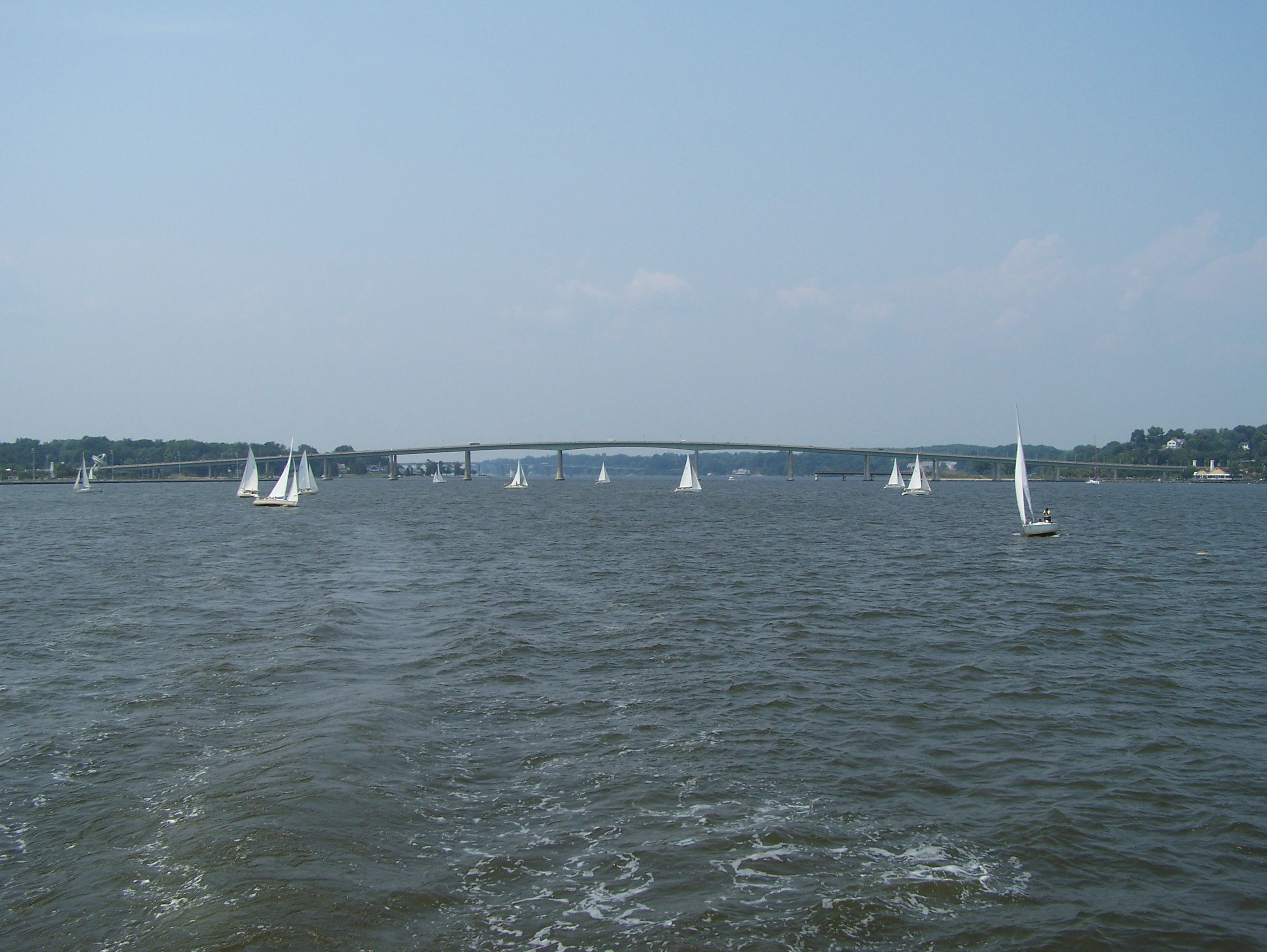
- Coordinates: 38°59′34.58″N 76°29′14.47″W
- Carries: MD 450, cyclists and pedestrians
- Crosses: Severn River
- Locale: Annapolis, Maryland USA
- Other name: Naval Academy Bridge
- Maintained by: Maryland State Highway Administration

History
- Opened: 1994; 32 years ago

Location
- Interactive map of U.S. Naval Academy Bridge

The U.S. Naval Academy Bridge is a bridge that crosses the Severn River in Annapolis, Maryland. It is located downriver from the Severn River Bridge and adjacent to the United States Naval Academy. Its predecessor, a bascule bridge, once served as the main point of entry into Annapolis from both Ritchie Highway and the ferry to the Eastern Shore prior to the construction of the John Hanson Highway and the current Severn River Bridge. In 1994, the deteriorating bascule bridge was replaced with the current crossing. The bridge's design was the winning entry of a bridge design competition, and was officially named the U.S. Naval Academy Bridge in honor of the Naval Academy's 150th anniversary. The Naval Academy Bridge is part of Maryland Route 450 and provides an alternative entrance to the Naval Academy, avoiding downtown Annapolis.

== Design ==
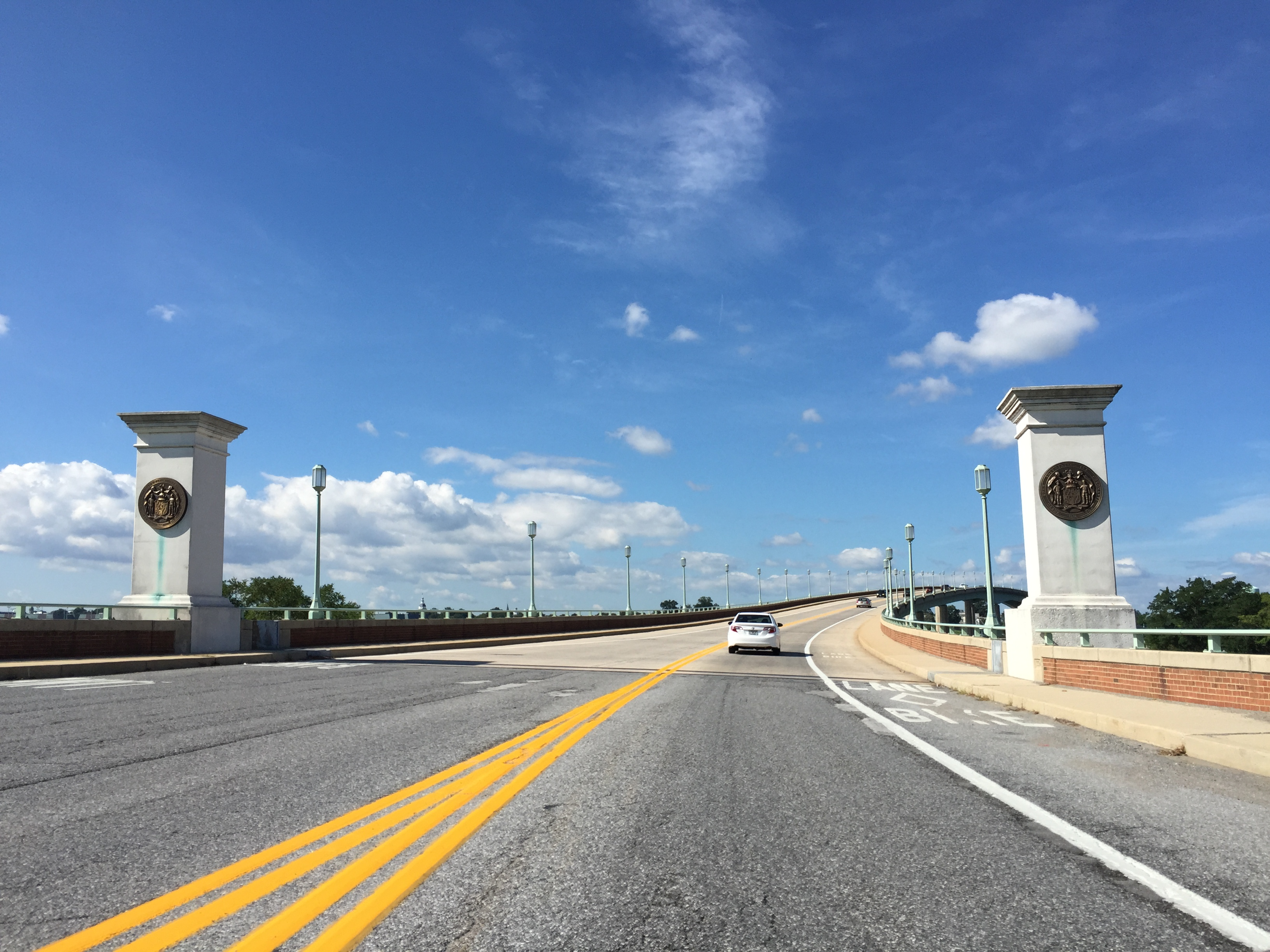
View southwest at the northeast end of the bridge

This bridge was the replacement for an aging, moveable structure. The design of the moveable bridge had been driven in large part by a desire to keep the necessary structure low and unobtrusive enough that the view of the surrounding landscape was not unduly impacted. Thus, when a replacement was required, it was necessary to accept another moveable mechanism, or overcome local resistance to a higher structure. Maryland's director of bridges, Earle Jock Freedman, took that challenge to heart ("There's a bridge where you say, 'Who's going to look at it? Everybody.'"). He brought the state's governor to the site, where they decided on a higher structure, but with concessions such as a scenic overlook with benches by the riverbank, and with an intensive public-input campaign, including meetings and talks at local clubs and churches. The resulting public suggestions were incorporated wherever possible.
