= Severn River Bridge =

Bridge in Annapolis, Maryland

- Coordinates: 39°00′23″N 76°30′13″W
- Carries: Seven lanes of US 50 / US 301 / MD 2
- Crosses: Severn River
- Locale: Annapolis, Maryland
- Official name: Pearl Harbor Memorial Bridge
- Other name(s): Severn River Bridge
- Maintained by: Maryland State Highway Administration

Characteristics
- Design: Box girder bridge
- Clearance above: 80 Feet Vertical, 134 Feet Horizontal

History
- Opened: 1953; 72 years ago

Statistics
- Daily traffic: 115,000

The Severn River Bridge, officially known as the Pearl Harbor Memorial Bridge, is a bridge that crosses the Severn River northwest of the city limits of Annapolis, Maryland. The bridge serves as part of the John Hanson Highway, which is signed as U.S. Route 50 (US 50) and U.S. Route 301 (US 301). Maryland Route 2 (MD 2) also traverses the bridge, but no MD 2 signs exist along the section of highway the route traverses. MD 2 separates from US 50/301 east of the bridge and becomes Governor Ritchie Highway, and to the west of the bridge it leaves the highway along Solomons Island Road. The bridge serves as the main connection between Annapolis and points east, including the Eastern Shore via the Chesapeake Bay Bridge; however, unlike the rest of US 50/301 in the area, the bridge lacks shoulders and is often a point of traffic congestion and numerous accidents.

== History ==
The first road bridge across the Severn River was a drawbridge built in the late 1920s. [From Anne Arundel County site: In 1886, the long-awaited Severn River road bridge was built on the site of the present Rte 2 bridge. All of these were made of timber and have since been replaced with masonry bridges in slightly different positions.] Including railroad bridges, at least eighteen have been constructed over the Severn and its creeks. The bridge served as part of MD 2 and later US 50 after the later route was extended across the Chesapeake Bay. (This original bridge was replaced with the current Naval Academy Bridge in 1994.) When the John Hanson Highway was built, the current Severn River Bridge was built to carry it across the river. Originally, the bridge carried only four lanes, but was later expanded to six when the surrounding parts of the highway were upgraded, leaving the bridge with no shoulders and a high accident rate. The Severn River Bridge was officially renamed the Pearl Harbor Memorial Bridge in December 2006 in honor of the 65th anniversary of the attack on Pearl Harbor. The bridge was expanded to seven lanes, four eastbound and three westbound, from the fall 2017 to the spring of 2018. The expansion narrowed each of the lanes from 12 to 11 feet, and the shoulders from three feet to one foot. The renovation was completed after eight months of work and the improved layout was implemented in time for Memorial Day of 2018, helping to reduce congestion during peak eastbound travel times.
