= Geoffrey Martin =

Geoffrey Martin may refer to:

== Sportspeople ==
- Geoffrey Martin (footballer) (1927–2020), Australian rules footballer
- Geoffrey Martin (cricketer) (1896–1968), Australian cricketer
- Geoff Martin (English footballer) (1940–2021), English footballer
- Geoff Martin (Australian footballer) (born 1958), Australian rules footballer

== Others ==
- Geoffrey K. Martin, American mathematical physicist
- Geoffrey Martin (historian) (1928–2007), British historian and Keeper of Public Records
- Geoffrey Thorndike Martin (1934–2022), Egyptologist
- Geoffrey Martin (politician), politician from Northern Ireland

== See also ==
- Jeff Martin (disambiguation)
