= Jeff Martin (game designer) =

American game designer and entrepreneur (born 1965)

Jeff Martin (born 1965) is an American game designer and entrepreneur best known as the founder of True Adventures and President of Dwarven Forge from 2004 to 2014.

Martin has numerous industry credits, not limited to having front-page articles in Polyhedron, as well as being a finalist for the Diana Jones Award for Excellence in Gaming. Martin has authored or co-authored dozens of modules for various platforms including Advanced Dungeons & Dragons (AD&D), True Dungeon, and Marvel Superheroes.

Martin was the president of Dwarven Forge LLC since 2004 until 2014, a company that specializes in hand painted miniature terrain. He has been the lead developer, or co-developer on several Dwarven Forge miniature terrain sets. He has guided two successful Kickstarter projects for Dwarven Forge.

== Personal life ==
Martin was born in Mt. Carmel, Illinois, United States, and currently lives in southern Illinois with his wife and two children. His main hobby is presenting the True Dungeon event at Gen Con Indy every year, but he enjoys the company of his family and friends whenever possible. Martin grew up in a thriving gaming community, having a fond affinity for hobby games from a young age.

Martin has been attending the Gen Con gaming convention for over 30 years, and has been a part of the gaming community for just as long. Martin won the first ever RPGA D&D Masters Tournament at Gen Con 20, in 1985. He was also part of a small team of designers involved in the play testing of Advanced Dungeons & Dragons 2nd Edition.

When asked what his childhood heroes were:

"My heroes growing up were Col. Hogan and Capt. Kirk. I loved the fact that they could always think themselves out of a situation. It kind of set me up to love D&D since the game greatly promotes creative problem solving."

Martin started playing Dungeons & Dragons (D&D) in 1978 when he happened upon a rulebook at a neighbor's house. He has been playing D&D pretty regularly since, as well as enjoying some classic war games like Third Reich and Dawn Patrol. Martin has dabbled in every trend that has hit the market except collectible card games, as he said "I was too long an old fart to play them (laugh)."

When asked what his favorite games are:

"Of course, there is D&D in all its incarnations as well as Third Reich, Dawn Patrol, Hyborian War (PBM), Car Wars, Battletech and Thief. I have designed several home-brew games, with a slider dice game known as Regent being my favorite."

== Publishing in Polyhedron ==
Martin has been published in the gaming magazine Polyhedron numerous times.

== Dwarven Forge ==
Martin has been closely involved with the design of the Dwarven Forge Miniature Terrain. Dwarven Forge is a company that specializes in hand painted, ultra high quality miniature terrain for tabletop gaming. While Dwarven Forge used to specialize in fantasy settings, it has branched out recently, releasing three unique science fiction terrain sets.

Martin started working in the Dwarven Forge booth at Gen Con as a volunteer in 2000, when he noticed Dwarven Forge creator Stefan Pokorny scrambling with others to get the booth open in time. He ended up giving up the rest of his time during Gen Con to help, due to the big response created by the release of D&D 3.0. Over the next few years, Martin managed the Dwarven Forge booths at Origins and Gen Con Indy. Eventually, in 2004, Pokorny asked Martin to manage the company while Pokorny stepped back from the day-to-day operations. Since then, Martin has changed the Dwarven Forge business model from a classic "sold in store" approach, to a "direct to gamers" distribution via their website and game conventions. Martin has developed many sets inside his tenure at Dwarven Forge, and he is especially proud of the Den of Evil and Realm of the Ancient limited-edition product lines.

When asked about the creation of Dwarven Forge, Martin said:

"Dwarven Forge was the brainchild of a talented artist and DM Stefan Pokorny who wanted to make something really cool for his players. He dreamed up a modular 3D tile system and he chose polystone as the best medium for his sculptures. He took a huge risk placing an order for his creations, and the responses was incredible. It has been 13 years now, and the demand for his art continues to grow." " The pieces are first sculpted by Stefan and then cast in rock-hard polystone. He then paints the masters and sends them off to a casting house that mass produces the pieces based on the original masters. "

When asked about Dwarven Forge customers:

"They are incredibly loyal and patient! Stefan only produces sets when he sees fit and we don't follow a production schedule. Sometimes we can go almost a whole year without a new set. Yet our collectors patiently wait for us. I think they appreciate his level of commitment to quality. They also are very giving with feedback and product ideas, and I know Stefan reads our Forums all the time."

== True Dungeon ==
Martin is the creator of True Dungeon, a life size 3D dungeon puzzle that occurs annually at Gen Con Indianapolis. Not only does he author every adventure to date, but he also builds most of the props and sets used for the event. True Dungeon started at Gen Con Indy in 2003, and has grown wildly since then. True Dungeon has held the record as the biggest event at Gen Con since 2005, selling over 4000 tickets a year for the annual event. In addition to the fantasy styled True Dungeon, Martin worked with Upper Deck Entertainment in 2004 and 2005 to produce True Heroes, an event similar in scale to True Dungeon, but with a superhero theme.

Gen Con owner Peter Adkison has said about True Dungeon,

"Simply put, True Dungeon is the coolest event in the gaming universe. It's the largest event at Gen Con, in fact it’s so big that Gen Con has to open registration for it separate from the rest of the event listing or the system crashes. It’s so cool it has its own line of merchandise that is traded on the secondary market like collectibles. It must be seen to be believed! I am very proud to have True Dungeon as the Gen Con centerpiece."

Martin is also the creator and designer of the unique True Dungeon game component known as True Dungeon Treasure Tokens. These have been printed in yearly editions since 2003, and have created their own secondary market on eBay; One token went for over $1,000 at auction. Martin is the lead content designer and co-graphic designer for these full color in-game pieces. Every edition since 2004 has sold out.

Martin is also co-videographer and co-editor for the True Dungeon teaser trailers.

== Awards and nominations ==
Martin was one of five nominees for the 2004 Diana Jones Award for Excellence in Gaming, an annual award created to publicly acknowledge excellence in gaming. Martin has also received praise in numerous publications for his work with True Dungeon, including Dragon Magazine, and Knights of the Dinner Table.

== Other sources ==
- "History of Dungeons & Dragons". Wizards of the Coast. Archived from the original on 18 August 2000.
- "About Dwarven Forge". Dwarven Forge.
- "True Dungeon FAQ". True dungeon. Archived from the original on 2 September 2009.
- Staggs, Matt. "Countdown to worldwide D&D Gameday – Day Two – True Dungeon". suvudu.com.
- "An interview with Jeff Martin". True Dungeon. Archived from the original on 13 March 2010.
- Staggs, Matt. "Countdown to worldwide D&D Gameday – Day Two – Dwarven Forge". Suvudu.com.
- Nelson, Randall (September 2006). "GenCon 2006: True Dungeon Recap" (PDF). Knights of the Dinner Table Magazine. Kenzer & Company. pp. 49–50.
