= Battery Maritime Building =

Ferry terminal in Manhattan, New York

- Municipal Ferry Pier
- U.S. National Register of Historic Places
- New York State Register of Historic Places
- New York City Landmark
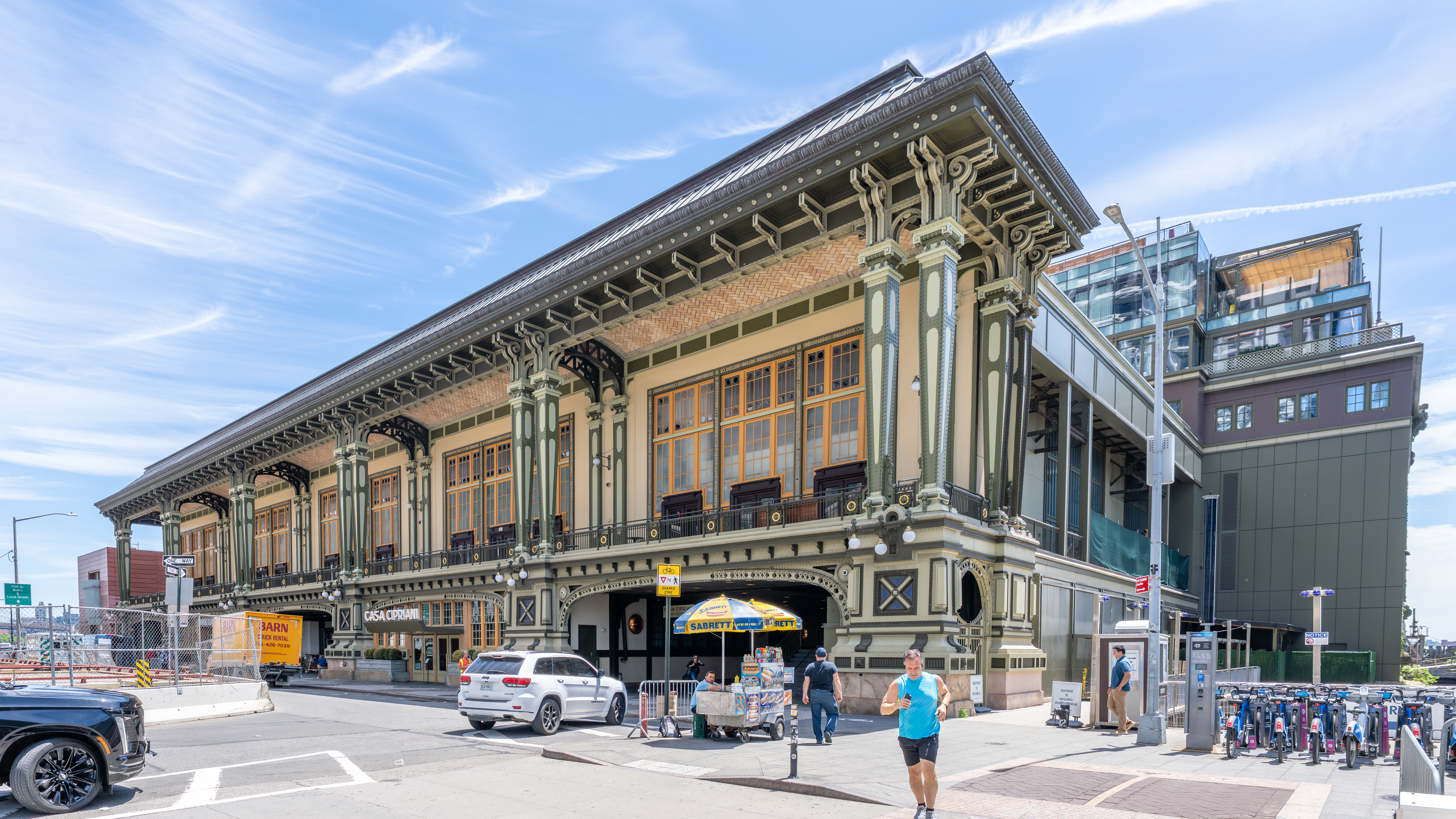
- (2026)
- Location: 10 South St., Manhattan, New York
- Coordinates: 40°42′03″N 74°00′43″W
- Area: less than one acre
- Built: 1909
- Architect: Walker & Morris; Frederick Snare
- Architectural style: Beaux Arts
- NRHP reference No.: 76001246
- NYSRHP No.: 06101.001741
- NYCL No.: 0547

Significant dates
- Added to NRHP: December 12, 1976
- Designated NYSRHP: June 23, 1980
- Designated NYCL: May 25, 1967

The Battery Maritime Building is a building at South Ferry on the southern tip of Manhattan Island in New York City. Located at 10 South Street, near the intersection with Whitehall Street, it contains an operational ferry terminal at ground level, as well as a hotel and event space on the upper stories. The ground story contains three ferry slips that are used for excursion trips and ferries to Governors Island, as well as commuter trips to Port Liberté, Jersey City. The upper stories contain the Cipriani South Street event space, operated by Cipriani S.A., and a 47-room hotel called Casa Cipriani.

The Beaux-Arts building was built from 1906 to 1909 and designed by the firm Walker and Morris as the easternmost section of the partially completed Whitehall Street Ferry Terminal. What is now the Battery Maritime Building was designed to serve ferries traveling to Brooklyn. The structure uses a variety of architectural metals and originally contained a large waiting area on the second floor. The Battery Maritime Building is the only Exposition Universelle-style ferry building still operating in Manhattan. The similarly-designed westernmost section of the Whitehall Street Ferry Terminal, serving ferries to Staten Island, was rebuilt as the Staten Island Ferry Whitehall Terminal; the center section was never built.

The terminal was used by Brooklyn ferry routes until the mid-20th century and subsequently fell into disrepair. The building was used as a Governors Island ferry terminal starting in 1956, while the upper floors were used by various city agencies, including the Department of Marine and Aviation beginning in 1959. The New York City Landmarks Preservation Commission designated the building as a city landmark in 1967 and it was added to the National Register of Historic Places in 1976. The underused structure was proposed to be converted into a cultural center during the 1980s as part of the failed South Ferry Plaza development. The exterior was restored by Jan Hird Pokorny Architects between 2001 and 2005. Plans to convert the interior into a hotel and event space were approved in 2009, but the conversion encountered numerous delays, with the event space opening in 2019.

== Site ==
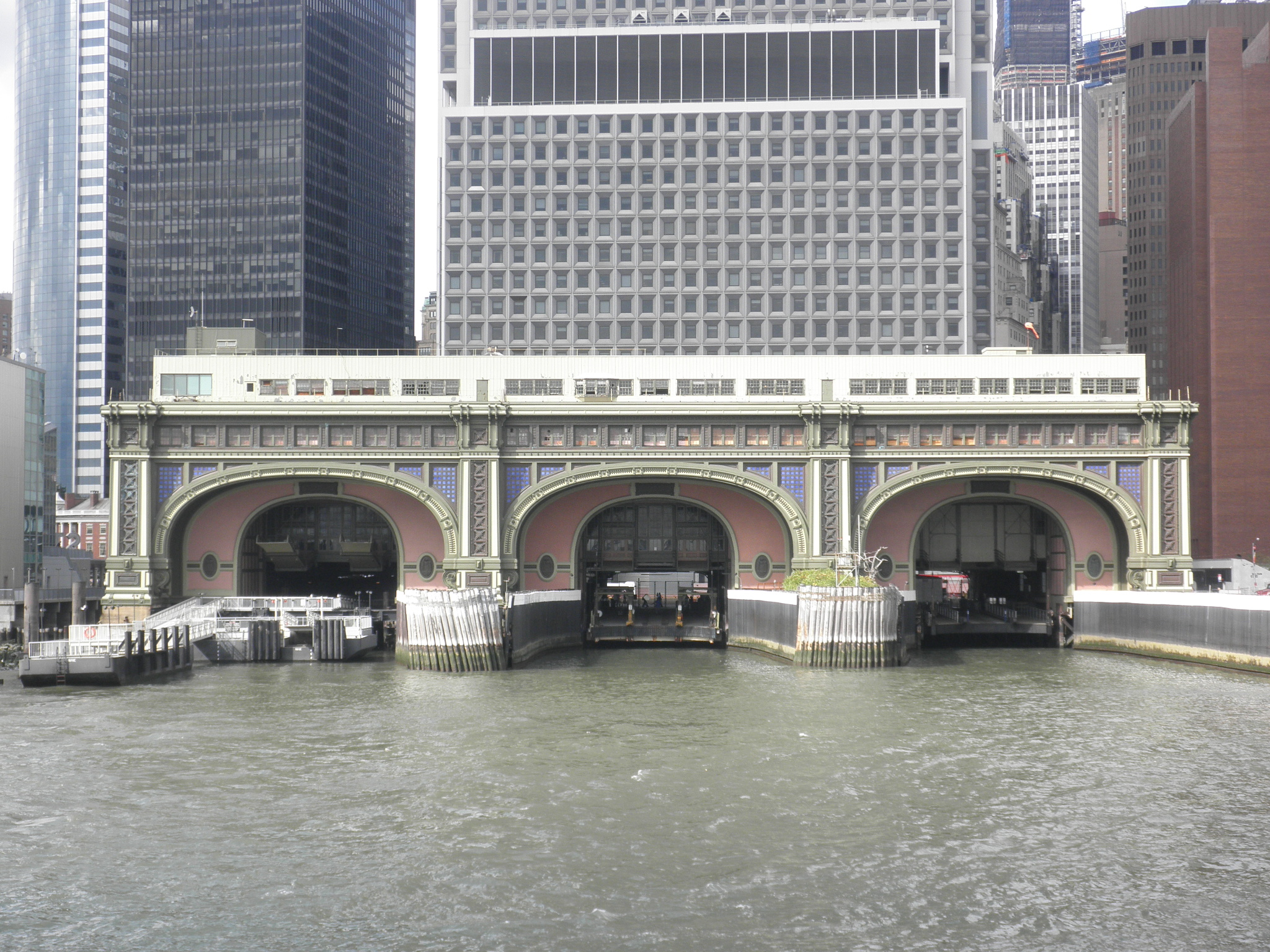
The ferry slips are numbered 5 through 7 from left to right.

The Battery Maritime Building is at 10 South Street, on the shore of the East River, in the Financial District of Manhattan in New York City. It is slightly east of South Street's intersection with Whitehall Street, adjacent to a ramp connecting the FDR Drive and the Battery Park Underpass. The Battery Maritime Building is between the Staten Island Ferry Whitehall Terminal to the west and the Downtown Manhattan Heliport to the east. The structure measures about 250 feet (76 m) wide and 140 feet (43 m) long. According to the New York City Department of City Planning (DCP), the land lot measures 311 by 556 feet (95 m × 169 m).

The Battery Maritime Terminal is close to the New York City Subway's South Ferry/Whitehall Street station, served by the 1, N, R, and W trains, as well as bus services at Peter Minuit Plaza. Through the Whitehall Terminal, access to the Staten Island Ferry is also available. There is taxicab service outside the terminal as well.

== Architecture ==
The Battery Maritime Building was designed by the firm of Richard Walker and Charles Morris and constructed by Snare & Triest Co. The project's construction was overseen by C. W. Staniford, the chief engineer of the city's Department of Docks, as well as assistant engineer S. W. Hoag Jr. It was inspired by the Exposition Universelle and is the only remaining ferry building in that style in Manhattan.

The Battery Maritime Building contains three ferry slips, numbered 5, 6, and 7. These are the three easternmost ferry slips of a never-completed larger terminal: the Whitehall Street Ferry Terminal, which was proposed to contain seven slips when it was constructed from 1906 to 1909. What is now the Battery Maritime Building was originally served by ferries traveling to 39th Street in South Brooklyn (now the neighborhood of Sunset Park in Brooklyn). The Staten Island Ferry terminal comprised slips 1, 2, and 3, which served ferries to St. George Terminal in St. George, Staten Island. The unbuilt slip 4 was to serve ferries from both Staten Island and South Brooklyn. The three sections were designed to be built independently of each other with a visually identical style. The westernmost slips were drastically rebuilt in 1956, but the easternmost slips remain as a part of the modern Battery Maritime Building.

As of 2021, the building contains five stories. The second floor was being converted to an event space while the third and fourth floors were being renovated into a 47-room hotel called Casa Cipriani. Part of the first floor continues to serve as a terminal for ferries to Governors Island.

=== Facade ===
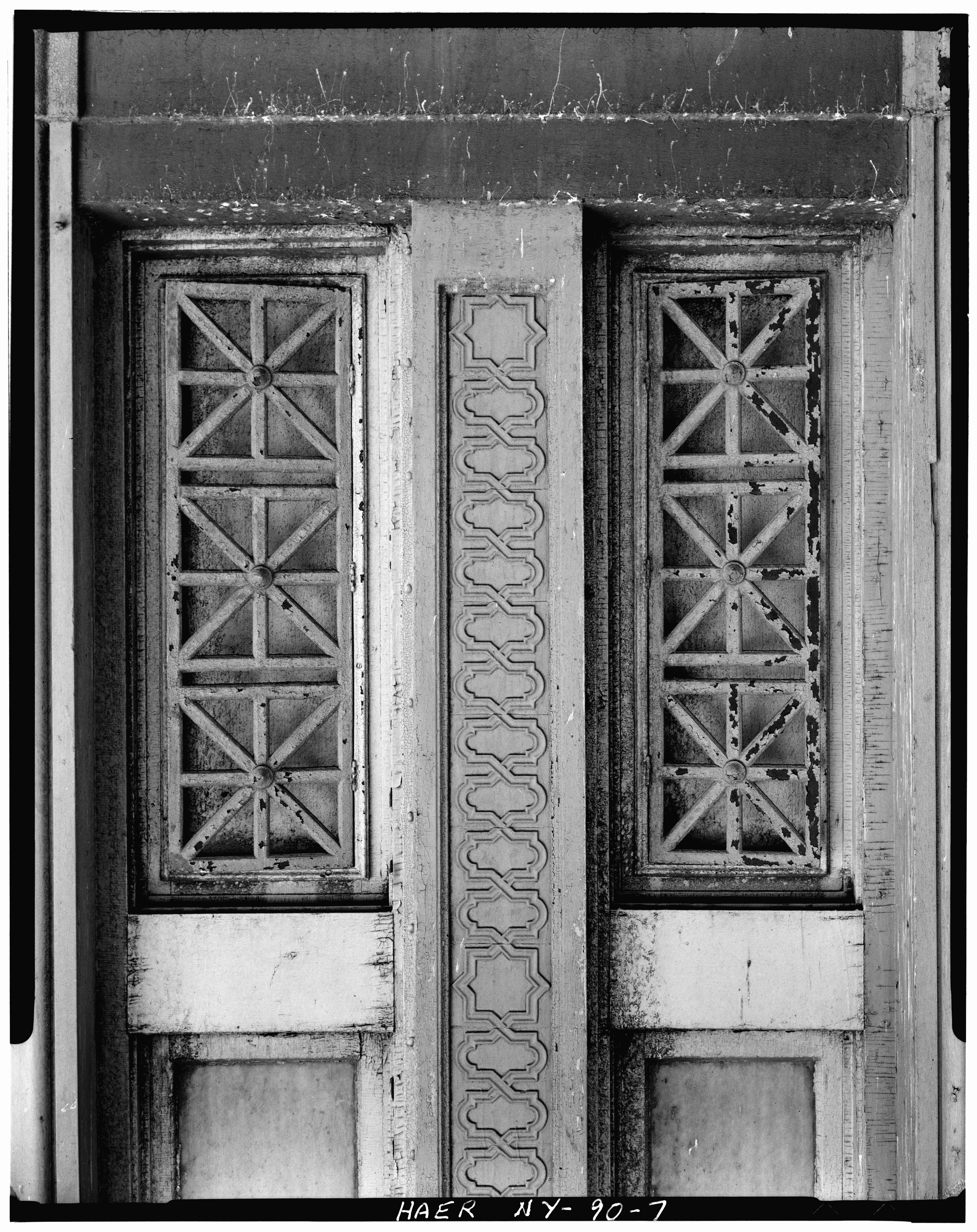
Ironwork and window panels on balcony

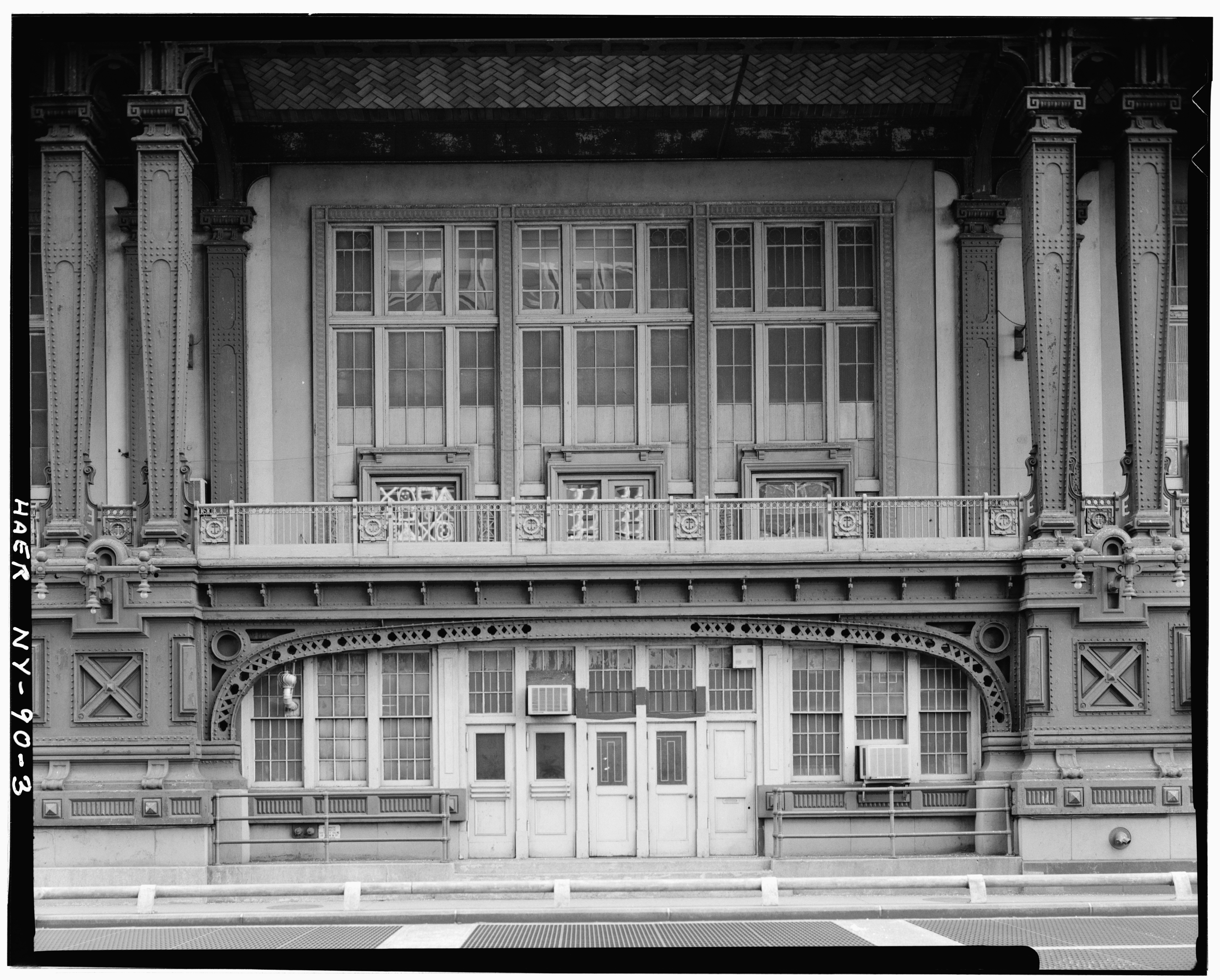
Entry bay, north elevation

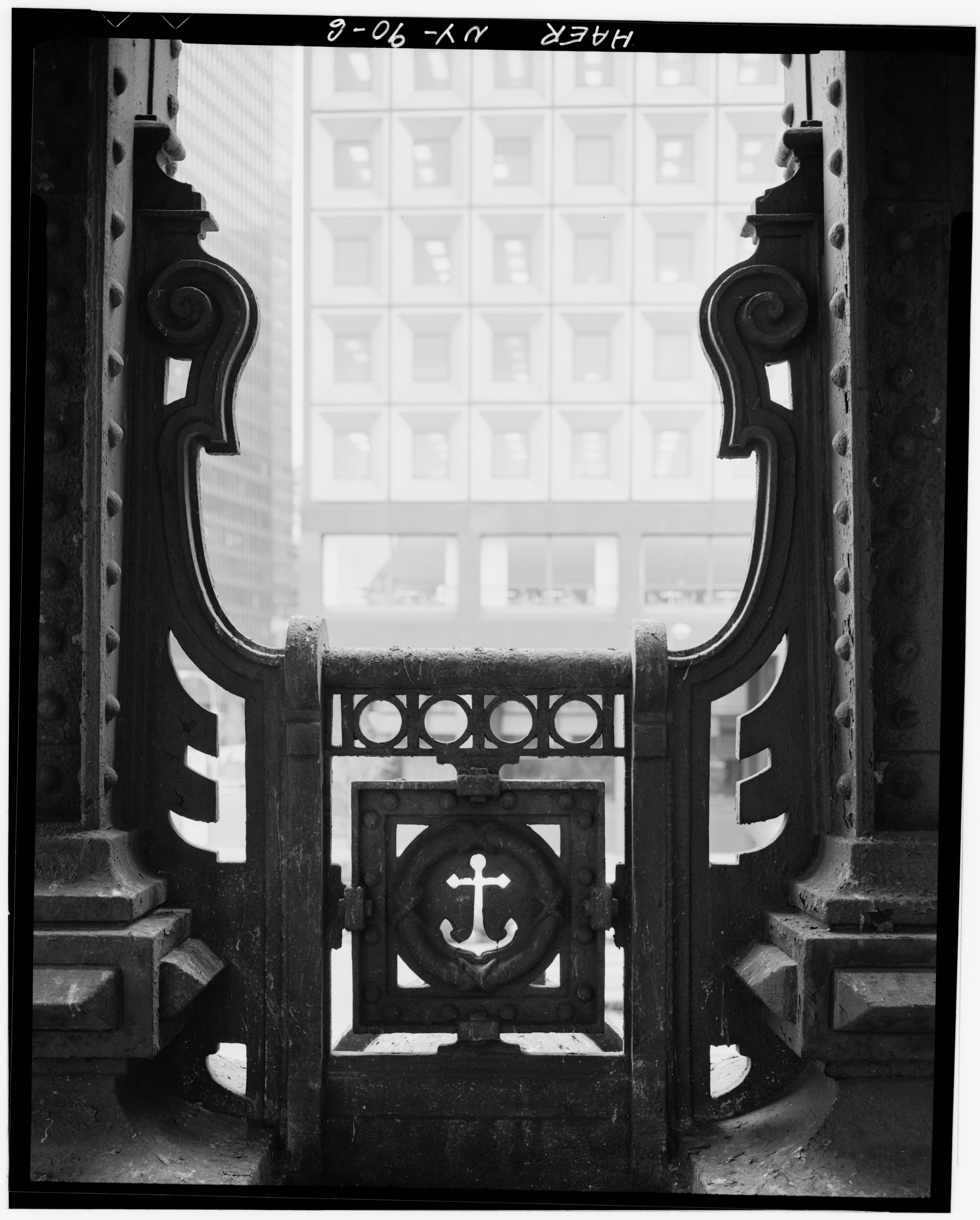
Railing between column on balcony

Architectural metals including stamped zinc and copper, rolled steel, and cast iron were used in the building's design. These materials are more widely used on the water-facing side, to the south, than on the other facades. The water-facing side is 316 feet (96 m) wide and four stories high. Ferry slips 5, 6, and 7 are spanned by tall steel arches, which are supported by four pairs of pilasters with ornate capitals. Slip 5 can accommodate vessels which load passengers from either the bow or the sides. Slips 6 and 7 can accommodate 149-passenger vessels which load passengers from the bow. The entrances to each of the slips can be sealed with elaborate swinging gates. Above the ferry slips is a penthouse with a row of double-hung windows.

The land-facing side, along Whitehall Street to the north, is 263 feet (80 m) wide and two stories high. It consists of five bays of sash windows and entries, flanked by six pairs of columns that are topped by decorative capitals and brackets. The columns support a hip roof, and the second floor of the land side contains a balcony with an elaborate railing. The balcony forms a loggia that measures 15 feet (4.6 m) wide; a similar loggia was also planned for the Staten Island Ferry terminal and center wing. The vaults under the porch roof utilize Guastavino tiles. The second story had a direct connection to the South Ferry elevated train station, the Staten Island Ferry terminal, and Lower Manhattan. The windows contain large frames with glazed glass and cast-iron mullions. Between these are connecting walls with wire lattice work, attached to the facade's I-shaped steel stanchions. The steelwork on the remainder of the building contains decorative motifs such as paneled lattice work, raised moldings, and elaborate cross bracings. Unlike in other structures of the same era, the steel structural members were left exposed without any cladding.

The roof was intended as a recreational area. Originally, the portion of the roof devoted to this purpose was clad with 12-by-6-inch (300 mm × 150 mm) Welsh red tiles, set in cement and laid on a layer of ash concrete. The other sections of the roof were made of gravel. A 2,800-square-foot (260 m^{2}) skylight was installed in the center of the roof during one of the building's restorations. During the 1950s, the fourth floor was built on part of the roof. In the 2021 hotel conversion, a glass-clad addition was constructed on the roof. The addition includes a swimming pool, restaurant, and bar. Spires and cupolas were also installed atop the water-facing side; these design features had been part of the original design but were removed in the 1930s. Including bulkheads, the Battery Maritime Building is approximately 104 feet (32 m) tall, as measured from the sidewalk of South Street.

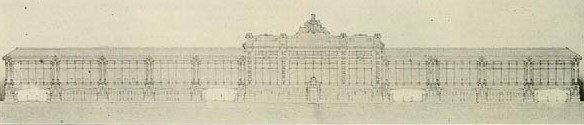
Land-facing elevation of the Municipal Ferry Terminal; the center section was never completed

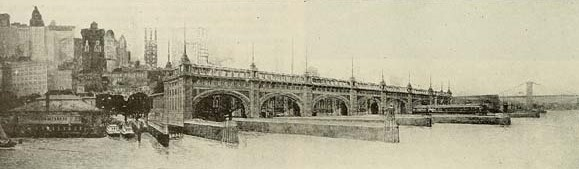
Depiction of the incomplete terminal from the East River

=== Structural features ===
The superstructure is made of steel framework and reinforced concrete floor slabs, which are finished with terrazzo. The main floor-girders vary in depth from 8 inches (200 mm), for I-beams, to 45-inch (1,100 mm) box girders. The ceilings are made of wire lath and finished in plaster. The columns of the superstructure vary in size; the larger columns are generally 25 inches (640 mm) thick and are built up of riveted steel sections.

Along the waterfront, the building rests upon thick concrete structural piers set over wooden piles, driven into the riverbed to the rock surface. Along the land, the concrete structural piers descend to the rock 20 to 30 feet (6.1 to 9.1 m) deep. Subway tunnels run directly under the terminal.

=== Interior ===
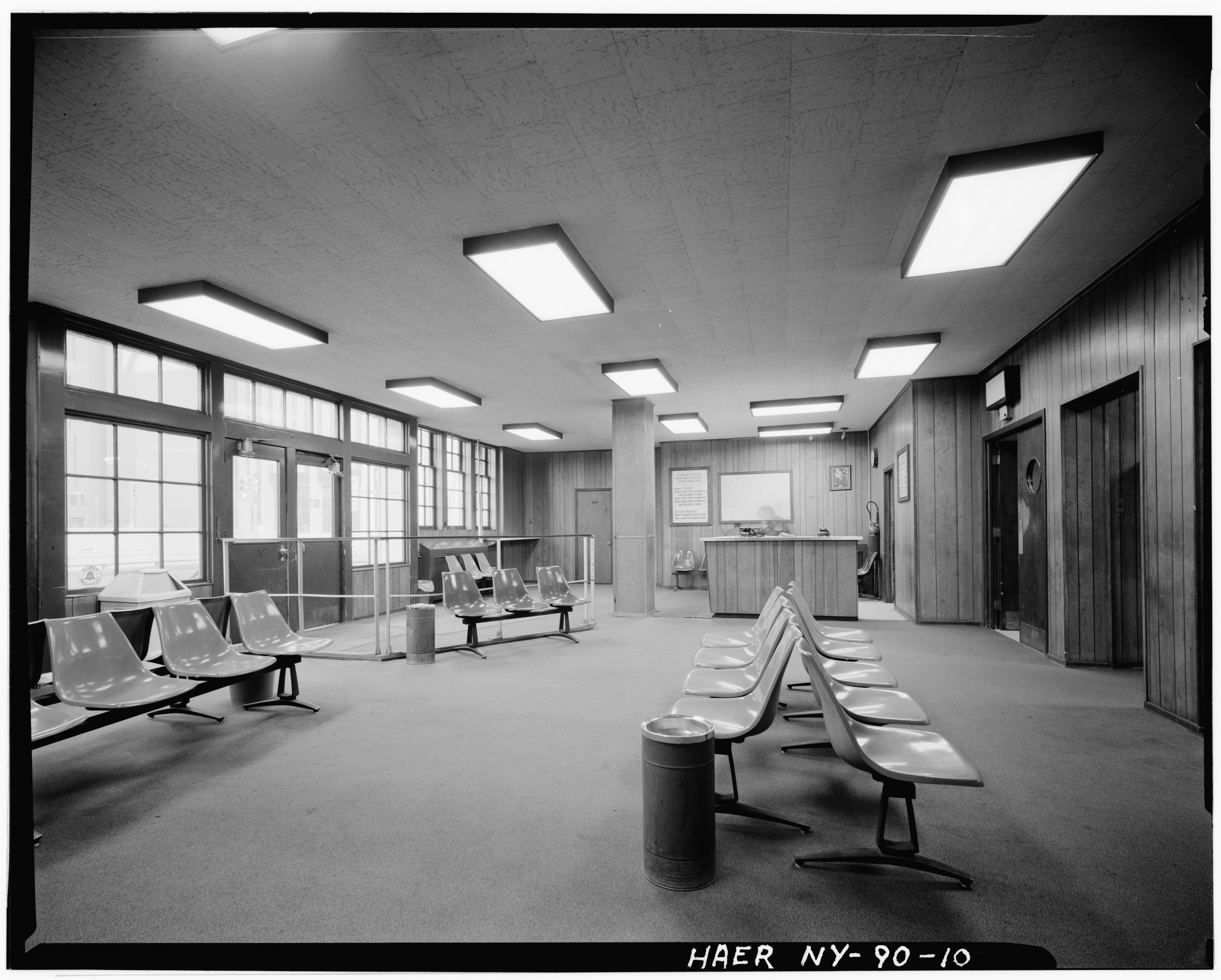
The waiting room on the second floor

According to zoning documents filed with the New York City Department of Buildings in 2020, during the building's renovation, the interior has a gross floor area of 163,964 square feet (15,232.8 m^{2}) and a zoning floor area of 163,964 square feet (15,232.8 m^{2}). Sources vary on how much floor area the Battery Maritime Building contained before its expansion in 2020. According to a report issued by the Manhattan borough president's office in 2008, the building has 115,586 square feet (10,738.3 m^{2}) of gross area. A New York Times article from 2002 cited the building's area as 140,000 square feet (13,000 m^{2}). According to a document published by the New York City Economic Development Corporation (EDC) in 2011, the Battery Maritime Building contained 107,430 square feet (9,981 m^{2}).

The interior has many decorative steel columns, beams, and molded ceilings, much of which dates from the original design. The terminal's first story contains a waiting area along South Street. The waiting area was originally accessed by two vestibules and contained a smoking area, ticket office, and other booths. The walls and furniture of the waiting area were decorated with wood, and the entire space was initially illuminated by a large skylight. Behind the waiting area, to the south, was a passageway 40 feet (12 m) wide. This passage connected the two transverse driveways to slips 5 and 7, each measuring 51 feet (16 m) wide. It served as a vehicular loading area for wagons and motor vehicles. The modern terminal contains the waiting area, ticket area, and restrooms for the Governors Island ferry line between slips 6 and 7. As of 2021, the section of the ground floor between slips 5 and 6 contains a lobby for the Casa Cipriani hotel, surrounded by a porte-cochere.

The building was originally constructed with a large second-story waiting room known as the Great Hall. The Great Hall measured 60 feet (18 m) wide and 150 to 170 feet (46 to 52 m) long, with a ceiling about 30 feet (9.1 m) high. The interior contains iron columns and stained glass windows and, as in the first floor, had wooden furnishings. Had the center wing of the Whitehall Street Ferry Terminal been completed, it would have formed a single, more massive concourse connected to the Staten Island Ferry slips. A concourse runs around the perimeter of the Great Hall. During the 2010s, a steel double stair was constructed between the first story and the second-story concourse, similar in design to a previous steel stair on the site. A daylight measuring 16 by 130 feet (4.9 by 39.6 m) was also installed in the Great Hall.

The third floor originally contained office space that could be used by the New York City Dock Board or rented out to other tenants. In the mid-20th century, the second story was converted to offices and the fourth story was built. When the Casa Cipriani hotel and the event space were added in the early 21st century, the converted interior included a 15,000-square-foot (1,400 m^{2}) spa and gymnasium, operated by Cipriani S.A., as well as health club KX. A fifth story, a rooftop penthouse, and first- and second-story mezzanines were installed as part of the conversion. The additions totaled over 17,000 square feet (1,600 m^{2}). Furthermore, the interior spaces were clad with glossy mahogany, including the club on the fifth floor. There is also a restaurant, lounges, bars, a cafe, and terraces for Casa Cipriani's private membership club.

== History ==
=== Early 20th century ===
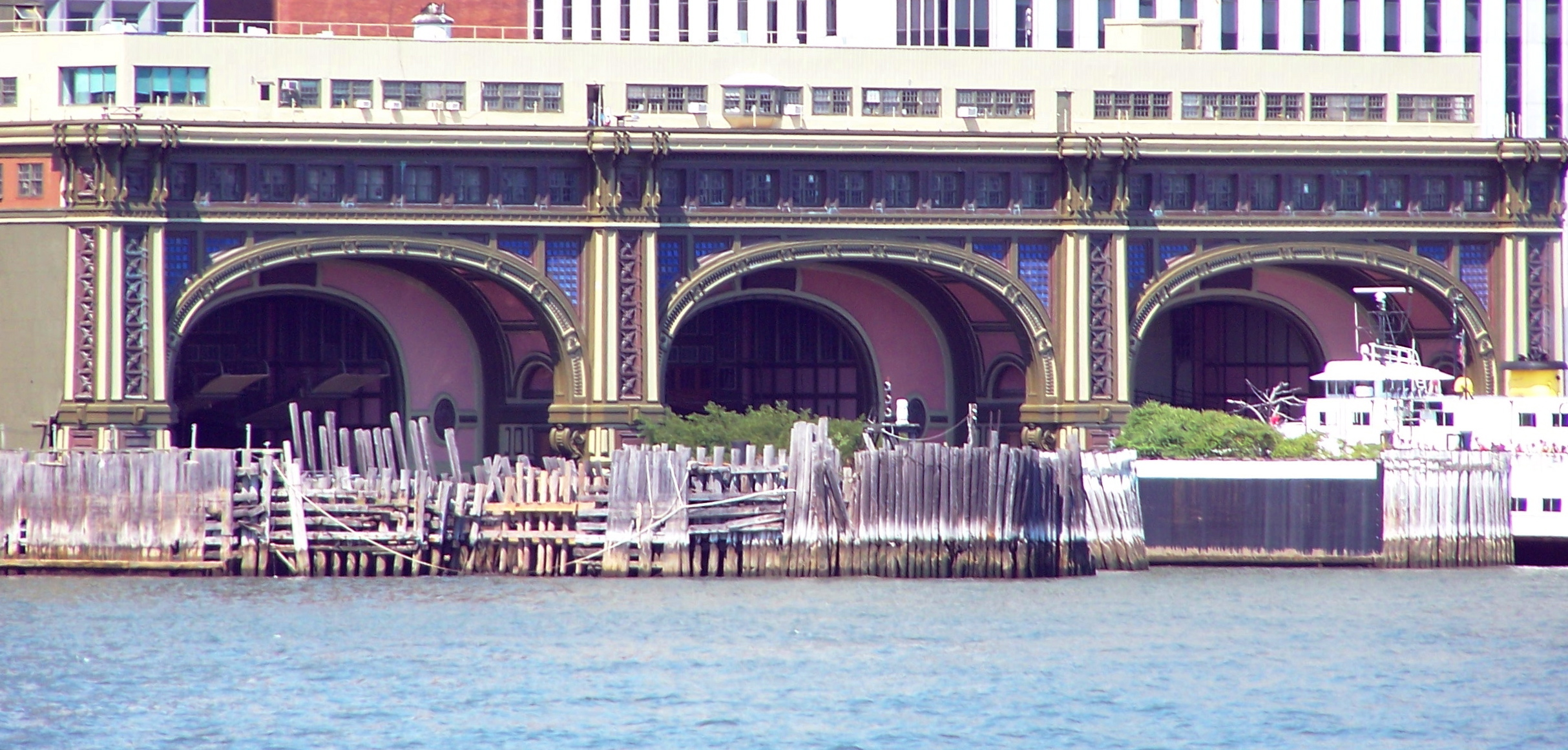
The pier, viewed from the East River

Ferry lines from Manhattan to Staten Island began operating under the municipal authority of the Department of Docks and Ferries in 1905, and ferries from Manhattan to Brooklyn were taken over by the city the following year. After the consolidation of these ferry lines, plans for the Beaux-Arts Whitehall Street Ferry Terminal in Lower Manhattan were approved by the city's Municipal Art Commission in July 1906, and Walker and Morris were named as architects later that year. The structure was to replace an earlier building on the site that had operated since 1887. Walker and Morris's plans were approved in February 1907 and a budget of $1.75 million was allotted to the work. The separate sections of the Whitehall Street Ferry Terminal were designed so they could be constructed separately while remaining visually similar. Work started on the Brooklyn ferry slips first, followed by the Staten Island ferry slips in 1908. A simple cornerstone-laying ceremony for the Brooklyn ferry terminal took place in September 1908.

The terminal was completed by 1909. The present Battery Maritime Building comprised the terminal's eastern wing and became known as the South Street Ferry Terminal, while the ferries to Staten Island used the western wing, which became the Staten Island Ferry's Whitehall Terminal. The city took over the Atlantic and Hamilton Avenue ferry lines from the Union Ferry Company in 1922. As part of the takeover, the two ferry lines were relocated from Union Ferry's Whitehall Street slips to the municipally operated South Street ferry slips. In 1935, Allen F. Stokes filed plans to renovate the South Street Ferry Terminal for $200,000. The changes included an upgraded fire protection system and expanded staff facilities. After the 1930s, the ferry terminal remained largely neglected for several decades.

By the mid-20th century, competition from the New York City Subway resulted in a decline in ferry traffic. Further competition came from the construction of vehicular bridges and tunnels across the East River. The 39th Street ferry service shut down on March 16, 1938, having failed to make a profit for twelve years. The Hamilton Avenue ferry was "temporarily" combined with the Atlantic Avenue ferry in June 1942 because its operation interfered with the construction of the Brooklyn–Battery Tunnel. Not only did the Hamilton Avenue ferry never resume service, the Atlantic Avenue ferry was also discontinued two months later due to a loss of profits. In subsequent years, the South Street Ferry Terminal fell into disrepair, though it remained in operation. Its original multi-colored appearance was replaced by a paint color intended to emulate the copper patina of the Statue of Liberty.

=== Mid- and late 20th century ===
==== Offices and military ferries ====
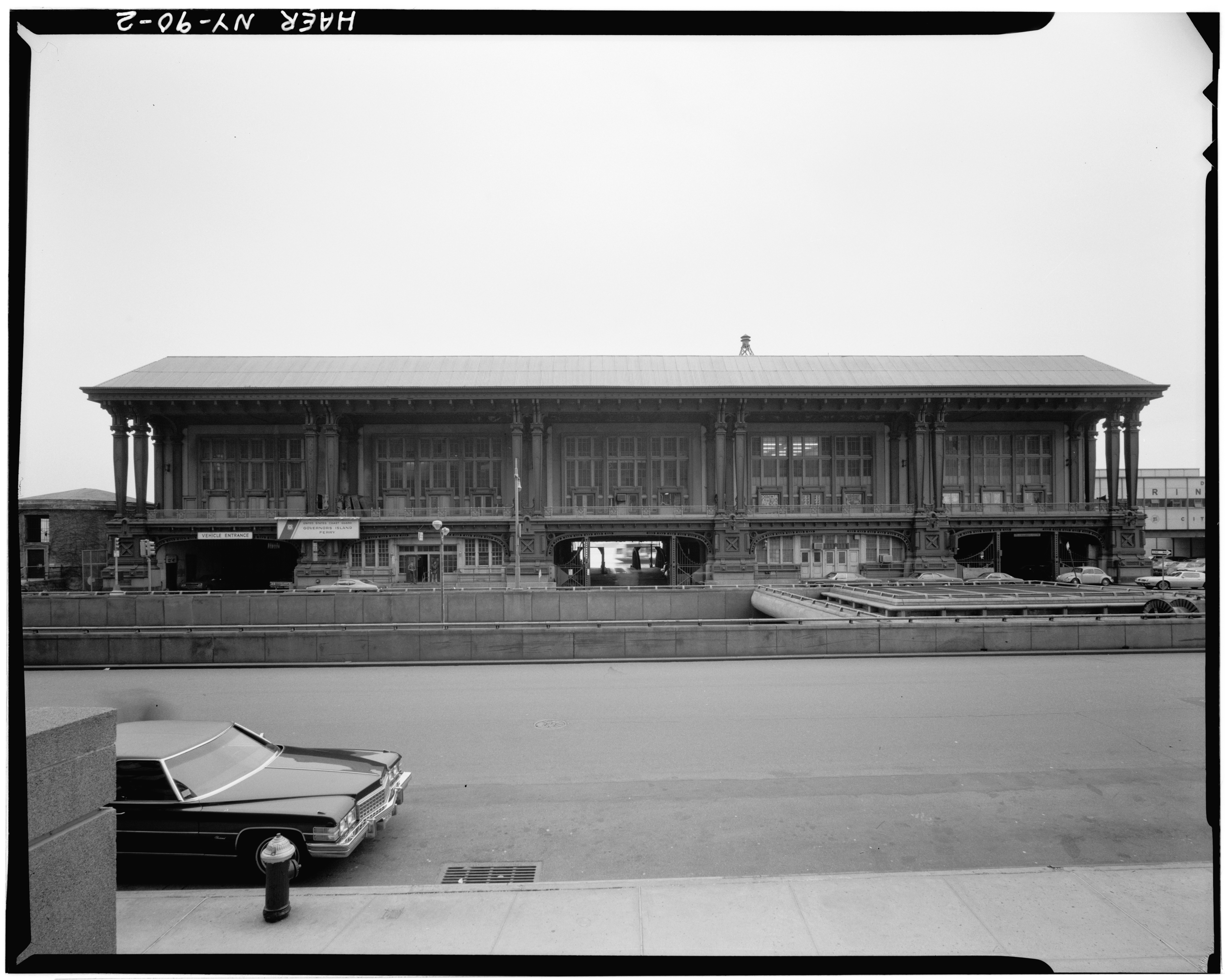
Land-facing side in the 1970s

During the mid-20th century, the United States Army operated ferries to Fort Jay, an Army installation on Governors Island, from a pier on the Battery, west of the Whitehall Street Ferry Terminal. Because of this, the Governors Island and Staten Island ferry routes crossed over each other and, because of strong currents between the Battery and Governors Island, ferryboats needed additional space between each other. In November 1955, the U.S. Army agreed to lease slip 7 at the South Street Ferry Terminal to eliminate the conflicts between the ferry lines. The Army, which was replacing smaller steam-powered ferries with two larger new diesel-electric boats, required larger ferry slips and docks at its new location.

Simultaneously, renovations of the adjoining Staten Island Ferry slips were announced in 1953. As part of the project, the South Street Ferry Terminal was to be rehabilitated, and office space for the Department of Marine and Aviation would be added. In 1956, the department requested about $3 million from the New York City Planning Commission for the South Street Ferry Terminal's reconstruction. The fourth story was added the following year as part of the renovation. The structure was renamed the Battery Maritime Building in 1959, when 1,100 employees of the Department of Marine and Aviation moved into the third and fourth floors following the $1.2 million renovation. The Battery Maritime Building was used by other city agencies as well.

The United States Coast Guard took over Governors Island from the Army in 1966. The Coast Guard continued to use the terminal to provide vehicle and passenger service to Governors Island for its 3,000 residents and 2,000 daily commuters. The New York City Landmarks Preservation Commission (LPC) designated the Battery Maritime Building as a city landmark in 1967. The terminal was also added to the National Register of Historic Places in 1976. At some point in the 20th century, the ferry terminal also served as a homeless shelter.

==== Proposed redevelopment ====
By the early 1980s, the New York City Department of Transportation (DOT) was investigating the feasibility of using the Battery Maritime Building's second floor for commercial tenants. At the time, the building was used by the Coast Guard ferry terminal and the Department of Ports and Terminals' offices. In 1984, the city laid out plans to redevelop the Whitehall Terminal and Battery Maritime Building. The Whitehall Terminal would be replaced, and the developer would restore the adjacent Battery Maritime Building, an official city landmark that could not be demolished. Accordingly, the city planned to look for a tenant to restore the former waiting room on the Battery Maritime Building's second story. City officials received proposals from seven developers in August 1985. The Zeckendorf Company was selected in July 1986 to develop a 60-story tower above the Whitehall Terminal at a cost of $400 million. The city government would retain ownership of the terminals and lease the site to Zeckendorf for 99 years.

In 1987, with the revival of ferry service in the New York–New Jersey Harbor Estuary area, the city government started renting out slip 5 at the Battery Maritime Building for ferry companies. That April, the Public Development Corporation and Department of Cultural Affairs started soliciting proposals from cultural groups to take space in the Battery Maritime Building. The Twyla Tharp Dance Foundation, the Big Apple Circus, the Dance Theater Workshop, and the American Indian Community House were among the organizations that expressed interest in the Battery Maritime Building. The Dance Theater Workshop and the arts group Creative Time were named as the tenants for the Battery Maritime Building in October 1988. The groups would occupy 30,000 square feet (2,800 m^{2}), half of which would be rent-free; they had to pay the operating costs and raise $4 million to renovate the interior. Officials planned to start renovating the Battery Maritime Building in 1990 and open the building to the public in 1993.

Conversion of the Battery Maritime Building commenced in 1990. Some performances and temporary exhibitions were to be held there until the conversion was completed. According to the plans by renovating architect Diller Scofidio + Renfro, the space would have contained a ground-floor entry lobby, flanked by offices on the second story. The waiting room, containing movable equipment for performances and exhibitions, was the firm's first successful design for an auditorium. KG Land was also a partner in the development project, which had stalled by late 1990. The South Ferry Plaza project was canceled in January 1991 due to a decline in the real estate market. The Whitehall Terminal's ceiling and roof were gutted by a major fire that September, though the Battery Maritime Building was not damaged. By 1996, the Coast Guard had moved its operations off Governors Island, and ferry service from the Battery Maritime Building stopped operating. Through 2000, the building's office space was used for storing DOT documents. The building's facade had deteriorated over time, and many of the design details had decayed.

=== 21st century ===
==== 2000s renovation ====
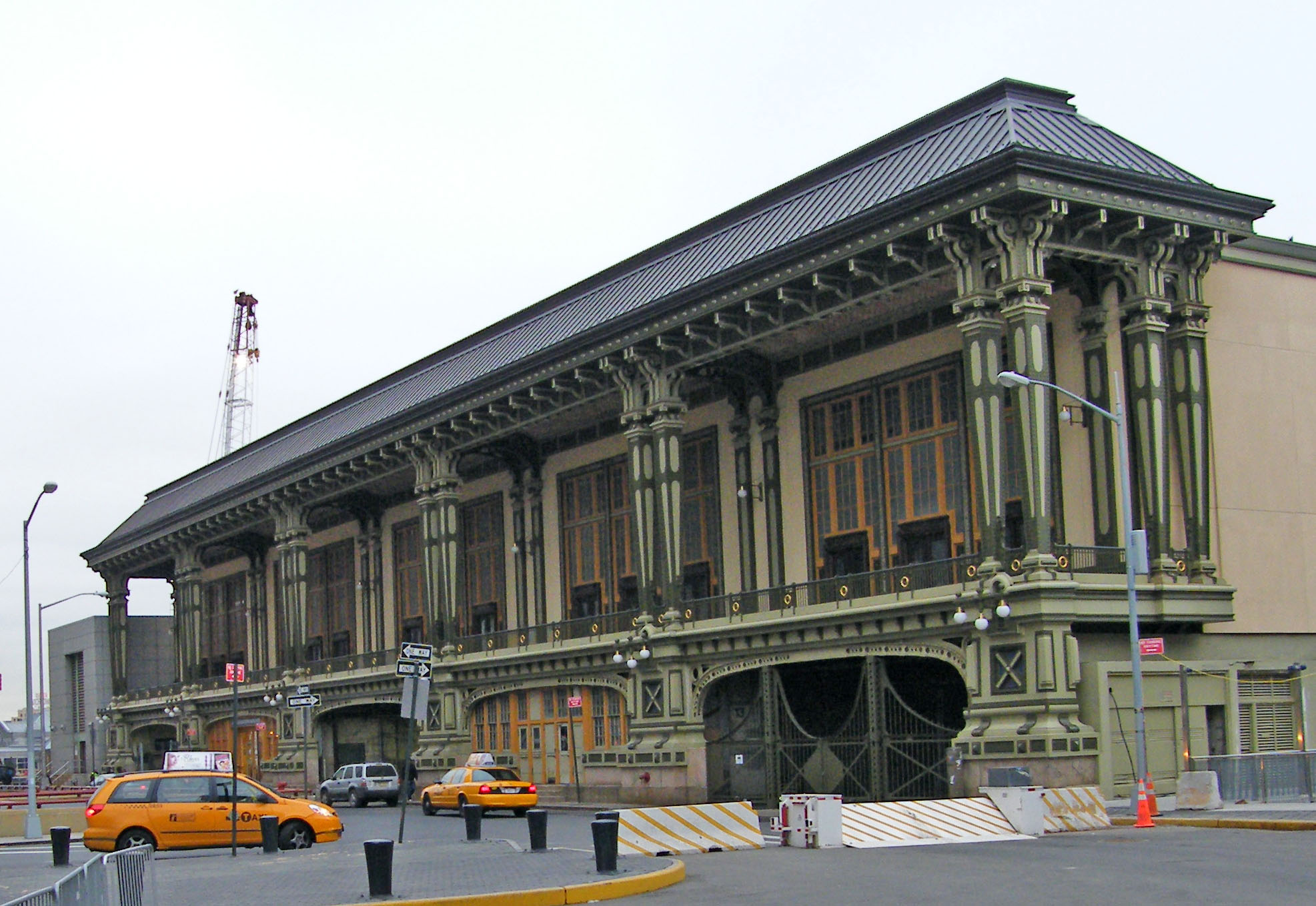
Seen in 2009 from Whitehall Street

The city government conducted a survey of the building's conditions in 1999. The survey found that the exterior and roof needed at least $30 million worth of renovations. The EDC started soliciting proposals for a $36 million, two-year renovation of the building in May 2001. Exterior restoration work started in late 2001 and about 200 workers vacated the building's offices in 2002. The deteriorating wooden piers were restored, and the exterior was refurbished and repainted in its original multiple-color scheme by Jan Hird Pokorny Architects. The renovation costs had increased to $58 million due to the discovery of additional deterioration. The facade was disassembled into 11,600 pieces and the roof had to be supported by temporary framework after one of the building's corners had settled by 2 inches (51 mm). In addition, 40 short tons (36 long tons; 36 t) of new steel was installed and 14 concrete bases were replaced. Some of the facade's copper panels, described by an EDC spokesperson as "irreplaceable", were stolen during the renovation.

The city also solicited bids to restore and operate the Maritime Building's interior in 2001. The interior renovations were projected to cost $26 million, but because the building was a city landmark, the interior renovation would be eligible for federal tax credits. The Governors Island Preservation and Education Corporation (GIPEC) assumed operation of Governors Island from the Coast Guard in 2003 as part of an effort to open the island to the public. GIPEC subsequently leased slips 6 and 7 at the Battery Maritime Building for ferry service to Governors Island. The GIPEC started operating the Battery–Governors Island ferry line in 2005. The exterior work was completed early the same year. Also in 2005, SHoP Architects proposed relocating the Battery Park Underpass's entrance eastward to allow the construction of a public plaza outside the Battery Maritime Building. However, no progress was made on the plaza plan in the following decade.

==== Hotel conversion ====
After the exterior renovations were completed, the EDC and GIPEC started advertising for proposals to redevelop the interior. In 2006, the city considered opening a food market in the building. The marketplace idea, modeled after the San Francisco Ferry Building, subsequently proved infeasible because the second floor lacked a loading dock. By 2007, Dermot Construction had won the bid to restore the building's interior at a cost of $150 million. The company planned to add a 140-room hotel atop the existing structure, designed by Rogers Marvel, as well as remove the fourth story. Marvel and structural engineering firm Silman determined that a fifth story would need to be constructed atop the existing ferry building. The LPC approved a downsized version of the plans in 2008. The same year, David Byrne's musical installation Playing the Building was temporarily installed in the Battery Maritime Building, using vibrations from the building's beams and pipes to produce sound. The New York City Council approved the hotel plan in March 2009, but Dermot had difficulty obtaining funding after the 2008 financial crisis.

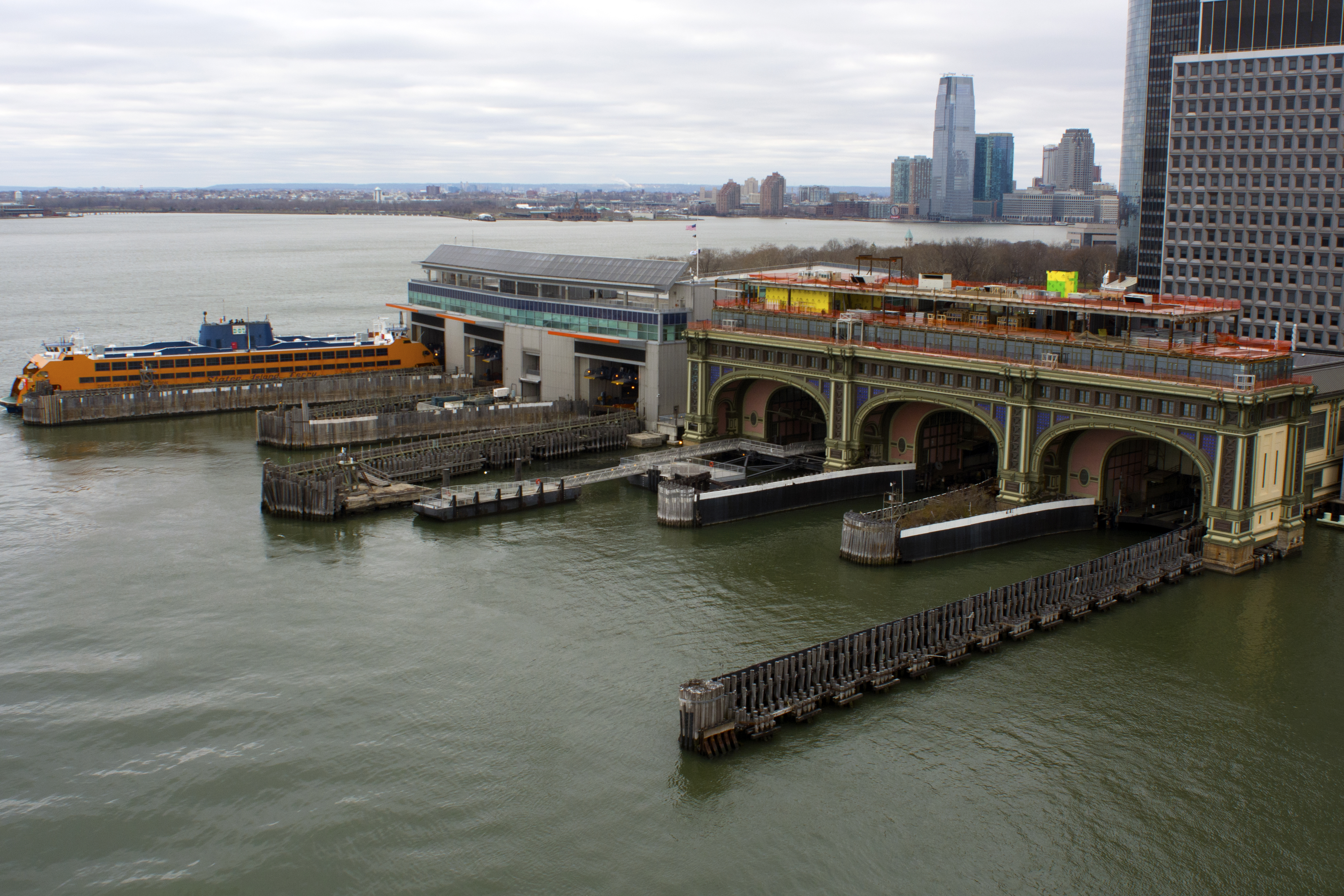
Seen from above the East River in December 2014; the Battery Maritime Building is at right

The New York City Regional Center loaned Dermot $77 million in 2011 for the redevelopment of the Battery Maritime Building. Dermot, along with the Poulakakos family of restaurateurs, signed a contract in July 2012 that allowed them to lease the structure for up to 99 years. Work was further delayed after Hurricane Sandy that October, which caused damage to the neighborhood and increased the project's costs. The hotel project received additional funding in 2014, and some progress had been made by the next year. In April 2016, Dermot withdrew from the project and Stoneleigh Capital signaled its intention to take over as the lessee. The project was 55 to 60 percent complete at the time. Stoneleigh ultimately did not take over the lease. In late 2016, the NYC Regional Center sued Dermot for not paying interest on the loans, the EDC also sued Dermot for nonpayment of rent, and the NYC Regional Center threatened to foreclose on the property.

The lease was transferred in 2017 to a group that included Cipriani S.A. After Cipriani took over the lease, the number of hotel rooms was reduced and the proposed restaurant was downsized. Additional funds were provided in 2018, with Midtown Equities taking a 30 percent stake in the project. Thierry Despont was named as architect for the converted structure. The conversion included restoring the original detailing, which had mostly been removed over the years, and reconstructing the superstructure, which was badly deteriorated. Two stories were also added to the building.

The event space, Cipriani South Street, hosted its first event in November 2019. When Cipriani took over the lease, the hotel was scheduled to be completed in mid-2020. The hotel's opening was subsequently delayed to 2021 due to the COVID-19 pandemic in New York City, opening as Casa Cipriani in August 2021 with 47 suites. The 2021 edition of the Independent Art Fair was also hosted in the Battery Maritime Building in late 2021. The project was officially finished in December 2021. The same year, as part of the Lower Manhattan Coastal Resiliency project, city officials proposed constructing a new terminal for Governors Island ferries and demolishing the Battery Maritime Building's ferry slips. Cipriani refinanced the hotel with a $100 million loan from Acore Capital in May 2022.

== Services ==
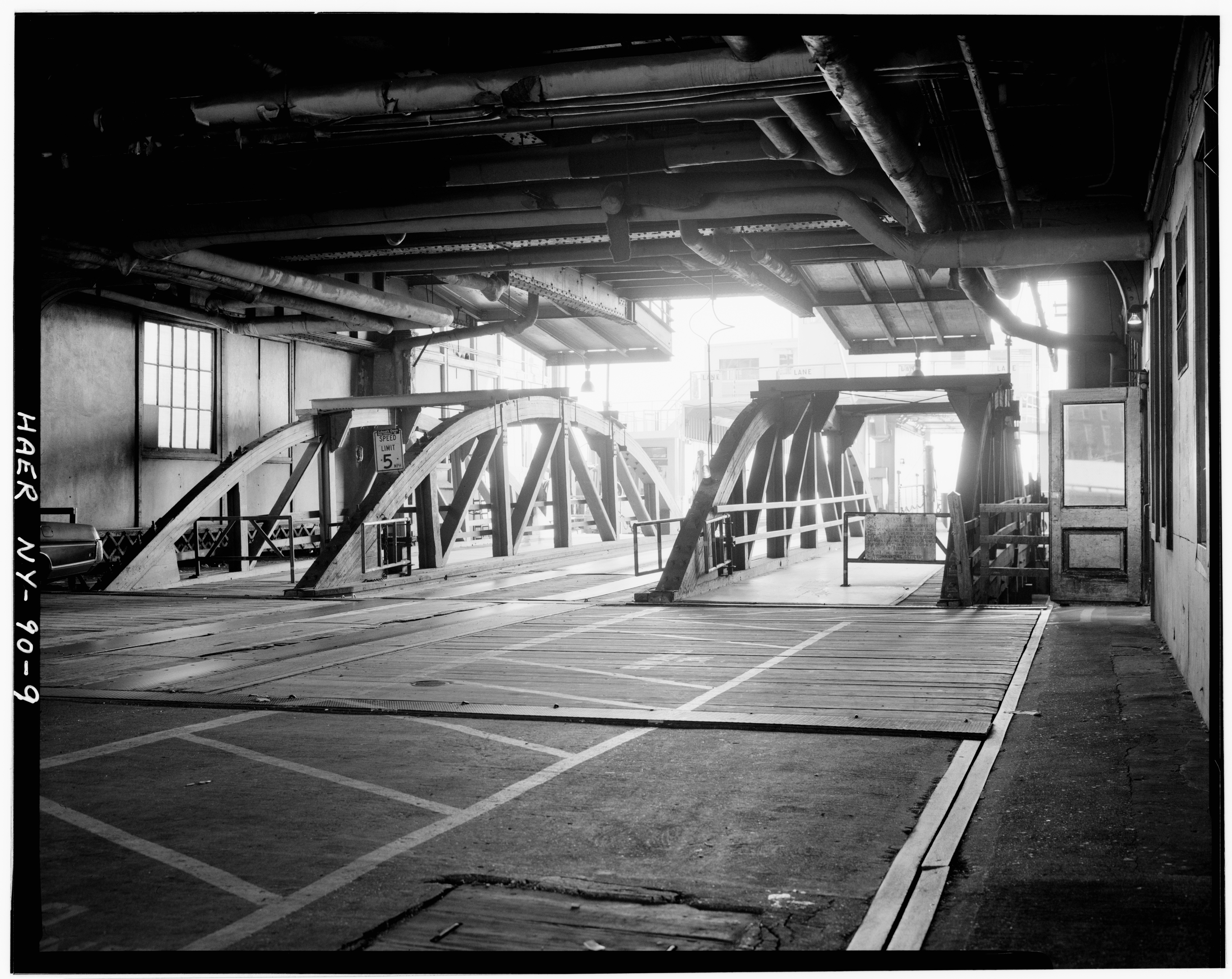
One of the loading slips on the ground story

=== Governor's Island ===
Throughout the year, public ferry service to Governors Island operates out of slip 7. The ferries are operated by the Trust for Governors Island. Ferries run half-hourly every day of the week. The ferries travel to Soissons Landing on the north side of the island, covering the distance between the destinations in about seven minutes.

=== Seastreak ===
In August 2020, SeaStreak operated ferries from slip 5, having relocated from Pier 11/Wall Street due to dredging near Pier 11. As of May 2022, SeaStreak ferries had been relocated to Pier 11 to accommodate construction at the Battery Maritime Building. On October 11, 2025, Seastreak returned to slip 5 on a permanent basis.

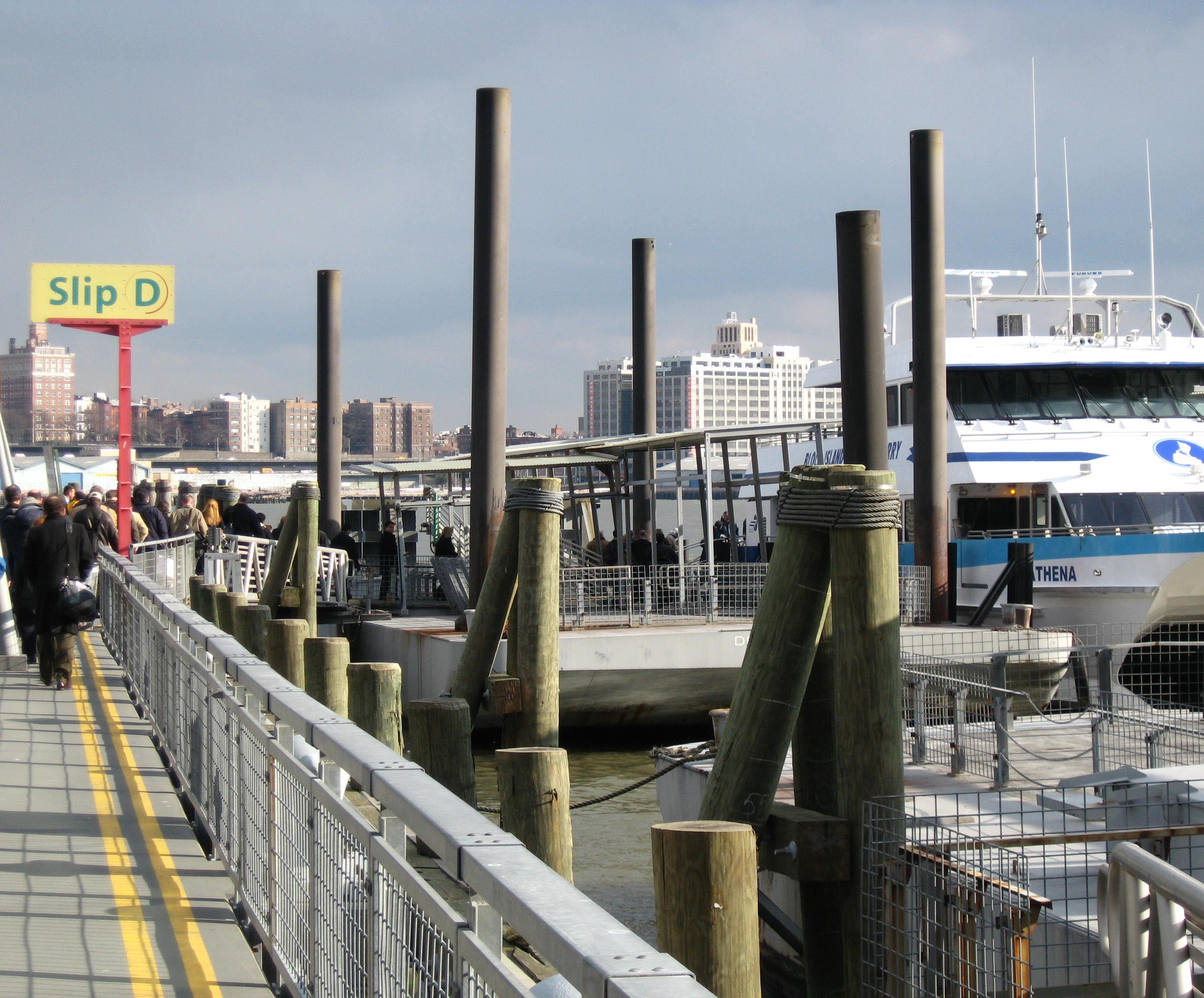
SeaStreak catamaran at Slip D

Seastreak catamarans operate daily to the Raritan Bayshore in Monmouth County, New Jersey. Journeys originate at the East 34th Street Ferry Landing before stopping at Battery Maritime Building Slip 5. After stopping at BMB, ferries continue through New York Harbor to terminals at Atlantic Highlands and Highlands.

Seasonal excursions and sightseeing trips operating from BMB include service to several destinations in the Hudson Valley (Bear Mountain, Cold Spring, Milton, and West Point) as well as the beach at Sandy Hook. Seastreak also operates seasonal whale watching cruises departing from BMB.

==== Routes ====
Destination	Intermediate Stops	Operational Hours
Atlantic Highlands	Originates at East 34th Street	Weekday peak hours
Highlands	Originates at East 34th Street	7 days a week

== See also ==
- Battery Park City Ferry Terminal
- South Ferry
- West Midtown Ferry Terminal
- Paulus Hook Ferry Terminal
- Weehawken Port Imperial
- Fulton Ferry, Brooklyn
- List of New York City Designated Landmarks in Manhattan below 14th Street
- National Register of Historic Places listings in Manhattan below 14th Street
