= Jeff Martin =

Jeff Martin may refer to:

- Jeff Martin (American musician) (born 1957), lead vocalist for the bands Surgical Steel and Racer X; drummer for Badlands
- Jeff Martin (Canadian musician) (born 1969), guitarist, singer, and songwriter for the Tea Party
- Jeff Martin (basketball) (born 1967), former player for the Los Angeles Clippers
- Jeff Martin (game designer) (born 1965), founder of True Adventures company and president of Dwarven Forge
- Jeff Martin (writer), on The Simpsons
- Jeff Martin (tenor), American operatic tenor
- Jeff Martin, lead vocalist for the American band Idaho
- Jeff Martin (All My Children), fictional character on All My Children
- Jeffrey Martin, an American singer who made the 2023 album Thank God We Left the Garden

== See also ==
- Geoff Martin (disambiguation)
- Geoffrey Martin (disambiguation)
