= True Heroes =

True Heroes may refer to:

- True Heroes (event), an event organised in 2004 related to the role-playing game True Adventures
- True Heroes (TV series), a 2003 television series in Singapore
