= Dwarven Forge =

- Type: Limited liability company
- Industry: Tabletop gaming
- Founded: 1996
- Founder: Stefan Pokorny
- Headquarters: Westport, Connecticut, United States
- Key people: Nate Taylor, Chief Creative Officer
- Products: Tabletop gaming models
- Number of employees: approx. 18 (2022)
- Website: dwarvenforge.com

Dwarven Forge LLC, is a company that creates three-dimensional polymer tiles for use with tabletop role-playing games.

== History ==
Typical dungeon floor plan built with Dwarven Forge tiles. Note giant mushrooms in lower right and LED "torch" in upper right.

When Dungeons & Dragons and other tabletop fantasy role-playing games became popular in the late 1970s, players found that it was necessary to track their progress through imaginary dungeons by creating paper maps. Some companies such as Task Force Games responded as early as 1980 by creating modular cardboard tiles that could be used by the gamemaster to quickly lay out an entire dungeon floor-plan, but most gaming groups simply drew a map on a piece of graph paper.

In the mid-1990s, Stefan Pokorny, an artist who played Dungeons & Dragons, started to paint the 25 mm miniatures that he used to represent his characters. He was disappointed that his carefully painted miniatures were displayed on maps pencilled onto on graph paper, so he designed and created some hand-painted resin-based three-dimensional tiles. The other players liked the tiles, and since Pokorny was struggling to make ends meet as an artist, he founded Dwarven Forge in 1996 as a side business. Pokorny designed modular tiles that could be used to create a three-dimensional dungeon floor plan, cast and painted the masters, sent them away to be cast in a durable polymer, and then marketed the finished tiles through retail games stores and at conventions. He sold out of his stock in four hours at his first appearance at Gen Con.

== Tiles and product development ==
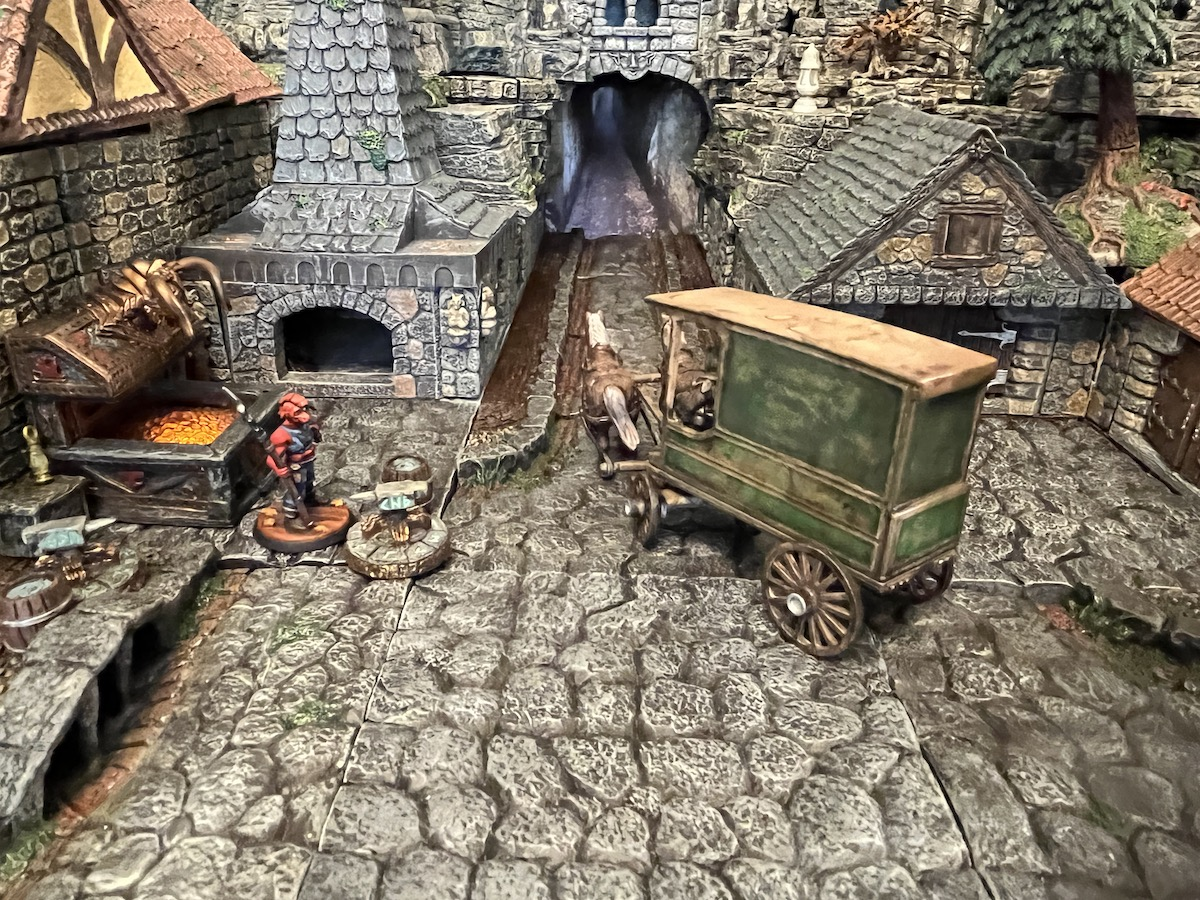
A scenic build in which all items are made by Dwarven Forge except the miniature smith, the two lanterns, the wagon and horses (though they do offer those), and the photographic background in the tunnel (which is Niton Tunnels 10.jpg by Simon Burchell).

=== History ===
During the Master Maze resin era, Pokorny and his creative team started by drawing a sketch of a potential tile. Using the sketch, they create a putty prototype of the tile that is then used to form a rubber mold, which in turn is used to cast a tile master. Dwarven Forge then sends the master to a factory in China, which then manufactures required copies of the tile.

Tiles were originally cast in resin, but that proved to be too brittle, so Dwarven Forge eventually switched to a more durable and proprietary PVC polymer, marketed as "Dwarvenite," which is regarded as being "sturdy enough to stand on while also delicate enough to be hand-painted."

Dwarven Forge has attributed their success to their multidisciplinary team made up of a carpenter-poet, sculptors, and a "recovering architect."

=== Current and ongoing developments ===
Under Chief Creative Officer Nate Taylor's leadership the team has expanded their design process to move back and forth between early "sketch" shapes in foam and digital sculpting and 3D prints of those forms. Once the geometry of the piece is worked out, for most pieces final sculpting detail is still done by hand with clay.

The pieces use the 1"=5' scale found in D&D, Pathfinder, and other popular role-playing games. Basic pieces include floors, walls, furniture and swinging doors. Many specialty pieces have been created as well, including everything from temple altars to giant mushrooms. Some pieces incorporate LEDs for special effects such as torches. In 2019 with their Dungeon of Doom Kickstarter, Dwarven Forge began incorporating small anchor magnets attached to the bottom of each piece so that they will stay together once placed on a metal tray or against a metal wall.

As of 2023, designers were attempting to make the tiles more modular, like Legos.

Pre-painted pieces make up the majority of the products sold, however the company also offers unpainted scenery, their own branded paint line, and a YouTube channel with tutorials.

== Sets and crowdfunding campaigns ==
Sets and crowdfunding campaigns
Set / Campaign	Type	Date Shipped To Customers	Material	Notes
Room	set		resin	MM-001
Room & Passage	set		resin	MM-002
Octagonal Room	set		resin	MM-003
Diagonal Walls	set		resin	MM-004
Short Passages	set		resin	MM-005
Wicked Additions	set		resin	MM-006
Ogre's Den	set		resin	MM-007
Curved Walls & Passage	set		resin	MM-008
Deluxe Room	set		resin	MM-009
Short Passages	set		resin	MM-010
Wicked Additions II	set		resin	MM-011
Dungeon Accessories	set		resin	MM-012
Medieval Furniture	set		resin	MM-013
Narrow Passages	set		resin	MM-014
Cavern	set		resin	MM-015
Treasures & Magic Items	set		resin	MM-016
Advanced Builder	set	2002	resin	MM-017
Traps!	set	2002	resin	MM-018
Traps 2	set	2002	MM-019	
Cavernous Passage	set	2003	resin	MM-020
Sci-Fi Starter	set	June 2004	SF-001	
Sci-Fi Passage	set	June 2004	resin	SF=002
Fantasy Floor	set	October 2004	resin	MM-021
Fantasy Starter	set	October 2004	resin	MM-022
Sci-Fi Alpha Expansion	set	October 2004	SF-003	
Den of Evil: Room and Passage	set	2005	resin	MM-023
Sci-Fi Beta Expansion	set	February 2006	resin	SF-004
Cavernous Rivers and Walls	set	June 2006	resin	MM-024; pre-orders opened April
Cavernous Lake	set	August 2006	resin	MM-025; pre-orders opened May
Medieval Building	set	August 2006	resin	MM-026
Den of Evil: Wicked Additions	set	December 2006	resin	MM-027; pre-orders opened October
Medieval Building Expansion	set	April 2007	resin	MM-028; pre-orders opened February
Den of Evil: Room	set	April 2007	resin	MM-030; pre-orders opened February
Tavern Accessories	set	October 2007	resin	MM-029; pre-orders opened July
Cavernous Lake Expansion	set	October 2007	resin	MM-031; pre-orders opened July
Cavernous Chasm	set	February 2008	resin	MM-032; pre-orders opened November 2007
Sci-Fi Gamma	set	July 2008	resin	SF-005; pre-orders opened May
Realm of the Ancients	set	February 2009	resin	MM-034; pre-orders opened December 2008
Realm of the Ancients II	set	June 2009	resin	MM-035; pre-orders opened April
Den of Evil: Hellscape	set	October 2009	resin	MM-036
Ruins	set	August 2010	resin	MM-037; pre-orders opened June
Wicked Additions 3	set	December 2010	resin	MM-038; pre-orders opened October
Ice Cavern	set	December 2011	resin	MM-039
Woodland	set	December 2011	resin	MM-040; pre-orders opened September
Woodland Accessory	set	December 2011	resin	MM-042; pre-orders opened September
Den of Evil: Expansion	set	April 2012	resin	MM-043; pre-orders opened February
Realm of the Ancients Treasure	set	Summer 2012	resin	MM-041
Catacombs	set	January 2013	resin	MM-047
Hellscape 2	set	March 2013	resin	MM-044
Game Tiles (Dungeon Tiles)	Kickstarter	October–November 2013	Dwarvenite (PVC)	campaign March–April; $1.90 million pledged from 5,398 backers
Caverns	Kickstarter	October–November 2014	Dwarvenite (PVC)	campaign March–April; $2.14 million pledged from 3,950 backers; Pokorny paints introduced
Catacombs 2	set	Summer 2014	resin	MM-048
City Builder	Kickstarter	January–February 2016	Dwarvenite (PVC)	campaign March–April 2015; $2.36 million pledged from 2,719 backers; Nate Taylor credited as Kickstarter Creative Director
Castle Builder	Kickstarter	May 2017	Dwarvenite, DwarveniteG / Gorgonite (PVC, ABS)	campaign March 2016; $1.78 million pledged from 1,688 backers; Nate Taylor credited as Creative Director, working with Stefan
Dungeons of Doom	Kickstarter	June–July 2018	Dwarvenite (PVC)	campaign June–July 2017; $3.06 million pledged from 2,897 backers; introduction of LED pieces, terrain trays, and anchor magnets, as well as the Burrows biome
Caverns Deep!	Kickstarter	December 2019-February 2020	Dwarvenite (PVC)	campaign July–August 2018; $3.32 million pledged from 3,106 backers; along with cavern pieces this release included Dreadhollow Forest, The Underdoom, and Crystal Caverns
Hellscape	Kickstarter	July–December 2020	Dwarvenite (PVC)	campaign June–July 2019; $1.24 million pledged from 1,855 backers; main campaign video (and almost all since) presented by Nate Taylor, Chief Creative Officer; introduction of light panels and the translucent yellow Dwarvenite known to collectors as "cheese"
The Fall of Plaguestone	set	September 2020	Dwarvenite (PVC)	pre-orders opened August 2019
Wildlands	Kickstarter	December 2021-July 2022	Dwarvenite (PVC)	campaign August–September 2020; $4.06 million pledged from 3,526 backers
Reliquaries	Kickstarter	October–November 2022	Dwarvenite (PVC)	campaign November 2021; $284,835 pledged by 1,812 backers
Cities Untold: Lowtown	Kickstarter	January–February 2025	Dwarvenite (PVC)	campaign; $3.51 million pledged by 2,621 backers; introduced biscuit system for connecting pieces such as the new modular roofs
Wildlands Reforged	Gamefound	February–March 2024	Dwarvenite (PVC)	campaign July–August 2023; $769,143 pledged by 739 backers
Starforged	Gamefound	June–July 2025	Dwarvenite (PVC)	campaign March–April 2024; $977,956 pledged by 767 backers
Dungeons Reforged	Gamefound	estimated late 2025	Dwarvenite (PVC)	campaign October–November 2024; $1.762 million pledged by 1,562 backers; introduced the Sinister paint scheme
Cities Reforged: Tudor Village	Gamefound	estimated Spring 2026	Dwarvenite (PVC)	campaign July–August 2025; $1.713 million pledged by 1,189 backers
Perilous Frontiers	expected to be Gamefound	expected 2027	expected to be Dwarvenite (PVC)	campaign expected Q2 2026; will add sand and snow biomes
Cities Reforged: Part II	expected to be Gamefound	TBD	expected to be Dwarvenite (PVC)	campaign expected Late 2026; will update and expand Sewers biome

== Awards ==
At the ENnie Awards in 2019, Dwarven Forge's Dungeon of Doom Modular Terrain won the 2019 Silver ENnie for "Best Aid/Accessory – Non-Digital".

== Reception ==
The live-play D&D show Critical Role has featured Dwarven Forge since some of its earliest use of 3D tabletop terrain for battle maps. Episode 44 of campaign 1, 'The Sunken Tomb', which aired March 10, 2016, featured a substantial build (revealed at 2 hours, 47 minutes into the episode, Video on YouTube) and Dwarven Forge has appeared regularly on their table ever since.

In the November 2009 issue of Wired, Michael Harrison liked the "massive variety of sets and different looks. From caverns to castles to inns, each set has its own accessories to help round out the rooms. Tables and chairs, columns and pits, even plates and tankards and food. It adds a level of detail to your encounters that even the most talented artist would have trouble replicating on a dry-erase board." Harrison also complimented the pieces' durability, saying, "the Dwarven Forge pieces are sturdy and built to last." However, he did admit that the sets were costly and took up a lot of room. "Because of their quality, the terrain is not cheap. Each set runs between $70-$120, and if you're aiming to create entire dungeons, you may need several sets. You'll also want to make sure that you've got plenty of space. A dedicated gaming room is necessary, as you'll need plenty of shelf space to store the Dwarven Forge boxes and a large table to build on." He also noted that Dwarven Forge pieces worked better when set up in advance rather than being constructed as needed. He concluded "Wired: Modular, ultra-detailed, well-made, and a whole lot of fun, Tired: Takes up a lot of space, pricey, hard for on-the-fly dungeon creation. Either way, this one definitely gets the GeekDad stamp of approval."

On his website Sly Flourish, Mike Shea noted the high cost of collecting Dwarven Forge. "A solid set of Dwarven Forge dungeon pieces runs about $300 to $500 on the low end." His recommendation was to "Get big pieces that matter" and "Focus on a few versatile pieces and get a lot of them."

== Reviews ==
In 1998, the online second edition of Pyramid reviewed the Mastermaze series produced by Dwarven Forge.
