= Thierry Despont =

French architect (1948–2023)

Thierry Guy Despont (19 April 1948 – 13 August 2023) was a French architect, artist and designer who lived and worked in New York City.

During the 1980s, he was the associate architect for the restoration of the Statue of Liberty. He then went on to remodel the Herbert N. Straus House at 9 East 72nd Street on Manhattan's Upper East Side for the billionaire Leslie Wexner of Limited Inc. fame (a home which later gained additional notoriety as the abode of Jeffrey Epstein).

Among the high-profile buildings in Manhattan he had designed the interiors for are 220 Central Park South, 53W53 (the interiors of the condominiums), the Getty Museum, and the Woolworth Building.

In the early 2000s, he designed the interiors for Gordon Ramsay's restaurant, the eponymous Gordon Ramsay at Claridge's in London. In 2005 he did alterations to The Promenade restaurant at the Dorchester, including fitting it with an oval leather bar the length of Nelson's Column. Between 2007 and 2010, he renovated the Lambs Club's former clubhouse in New York City into the Chatwal New York hotel.

In 2009, Despont redesigned the two restaurants and the bar Il Pricipe at the Hotel Principe di Savoia in Milan, Italy. Despont worked on the physical conversion of a section of the Battery Maritime Building in Lower Manhattan, into the 47 suite luxury hotel Casa Cipriani, which opened in late 2021.

Despont was known for being "the designer of choice for titans of industry," to cite his obituary in Architectural Digest. His clients included Bill Gates, Calvin Klein, Jayne Wrightsman, Annette and Oscar de la Renta, Conrad Black, Leslie Wexner, Peggy and Mickey Drexler, and Peter Morton. "To be successful at my job, one must be very good at understanding not only a client's needs, but also a client's dreams and memories," Despont told the journalist Nina Munk in 1999. "One must know where the client comes from and what they desire. Part of the craft is learning to read people, to see things they are sure about, the things they are unsure about; the things they don't convey verbally, but express through their surroundings."

He graduated from École Nationale Supérieure des Beaux-Arts and Harvard Graduate School of Design.

Thierry Despont died on 13 August 2023, at the age of 75.
