= Jan Hird Pokorný =

American architect (1914–2008)

Jan Hird Pokorný (May 25, 1914 - May 20, 2008) was a Czech-born American architect and preservationist.

== Early life and education ==
Pokorný was born on May 25, 1914, in Brno, then part of Austria-Hungary (now the Czech Republic), and was raised in Prague. His father, Jaroslav Pokorný, was an electrical engineer who served as assistant general director of the Skoda Works. Jaroslav was briefly imprisoned by the Nazis and emigrated to the United States in 1948. Jan Pokorný had relocated to the U.S. earlier, in 1939, to escape the German occupation.

Pokorný entered the United States on a student visa and became a U.S. citizen in 1945. He completed his education at the Czech Technical University in Prague before enrolling in Columbia University's architecture program, where he earned a master's degree and later joined the faculty.

== Career ==
Pokorný founded an architectural firm in New York City that specialized in the restoration and adaptation of historic structures for new uses. His firm undertook a range of educational and institutional projects, including buildings at Centenary College of New Jersey, the State University of New York at Stony Brook, and Lehman College in the Bronx.

Pokorný served on the Art Commission of the City of New York from 1973 to 1977 and was Commissioner of the New York City Landmarks Preservation Commission from 1997 to 2007. During his tenure, he was involved in initiatives to preserve cultural artifacts, including arranging a new setting for a statue of the composer Antonin Dvorak in Stuyvesant Square Park. He was also a trustee of the Grand Central Terminal Trust.

Pokorný's work included the restoration and modernization of several historic buildings, such as Lewisohn Hall at Columbia University, the Schermerhorn Row Block at South Street Seaport, the Brooklyn Historical Society building, the National Lighthouse Museum on Staten Island, and the Battery Maritime Building in Lower Manhattan.

== Awards ==
- Lifetime Preservation Award from Columbia University
- James William Kideney Award from the American Institute of Architects
- American Institute of Architects New York State Fellows Award

== Personal life ==
Pokorný was married twice. His first marriage ended in divorce. He was survived by his second wife, Marise Angelucci-Pokorny, and their son, Stefan (a well-regarded role playing game designer).
