= Casa Cipriani =

Hotel and club in Manhattan, New York

Coordinates: 40°42′4″N 74°0′43″W

Casa Cipriani is a hotel and private membership club that opened in August 2021 in the Battery Maritime Building, a ferry terminal, in lower Manhattan, New York City. While initial work rehabilitating the structure was completed by other entities, the final project and conversion, which includes a jazz cafe along with typical hotel amenities, was done in partnership with the New York City Economic Development Corporation, Midtown Equities, Centaur Properties, and Cipriani. For the physical conversion, Marvel Architects worked with Thierry Despont.

Members of Casa Cipriani's private club have included Drew Barrymore and John Legend. Club members can book rooms at the hotel before the general public can, although the club's membership fees cost thousands of dollars as of 2023.

In May 2024, Americas Great Resorts added the hotel to its Top Picks as a landmark property. The first edition of the Michelin Keys Guide, in 2024, ranked Casa Cipriani as a "three-key" hotel, the highest accolade granted by the guide.
