= Playing the Building =

Art installation by David Byrne

Playing the Building was an art installation by David Byrne, ex-singer of Talking Heads, and Färgfabriken, an independent art venue in Stockholm, Sweden. It originally ran from October 8 to November 13, 2005, at Färgfabriken. The concept would later be realized in New York City in the Battery Maritime Building in 2008 (May 31 to August 10), in London in The Roundhouse in 2009 (August 8 to 31), and in Minneapolis at the Aria building in the Minneapolis Warehouse Historic District in 2012 (November 5 to December 4).

The concept entailed utilizing the infrastructure of these buildings and spaces as resonating bodies to create sounds. Different methods are used to produce the sounds, including hitting columns with metal rods, strapping vibrating motors to girders, and blowing air through pipes. The sounds often resemble musical instruments, including organs and flutes. Byrne described the installation as "a very democratic instrument: Everyone is reduced to the same amateur level".
