= Dungeon Tiles (Task Force Games) =

Fantasy role-playing game supplement

Dungeon Tiles is a supplement published by Task Force Games in 1980 for fantasy role-playing games.

== Contents ==
Dungeon Tiles is a set of cardboard tiles meant to be used as a play aid in conjunction with 25 mm miniature figures. These illustrated tiles can be placed on a table and used to represent the various paths and rooms that characters can move through during a fantasy role-playing game session. It was a set of terrain tiles intended to combine together to form various locations.

The set consists of

- a four-page folder explaining how to use the tiles, as well as basic rules for how many figurines can be "stacked" on each tile, unusual combat situations, and combat formations.
- eight full-colour cardboard sheets of punchout tiles, most of them 2.5" square, that represent hallways, tunnels and rooms.
- 108 die-cut counters that represent objects such as doors, traps, chests and treasure, or various pieces of furniture.

== Reception ==
In the July 1981 edition of The Space Gamer (Issue No. 41), Steve Jackson criticized the relatively high price of the set, saying, "In all, a moderately good product, and useful for GMs. But I have to say that I think it's selling for about twice what it ought to. There was no need whatsoever to put it in a box! If only the tiles, and possibly the counters, had been supplied, along with a bag to hold them, this set would have retained 95% of its worth, and could have been marketed at a more reasonable price."

In the August 1981 edition of Dragon (Issue #52), Tony Watson called the tiles "nicely executed" but noted the lack of "curved walls and corridor sections." Despite this, Watson concluded that "Dungeon Tiles should be useful to those groups who desire more precision in the conduct of their encounters, or to the DM who feels the need for a little help in presenting the situation to his players."
