= Geoffrey Martin (cricketer) =

Australian cricketer (1896–1968)

Personal information
- Full name: Geoffrey William Martin
- Born: 7 March 1896; Launceston, Tasmania, Australia
- Died: 7 March 1968 (aged 72); Launceston, Tasmania, Australia
- Batting: Right-handed

Domestic team information
- Years: Team
- 1921/22–1932/33: Tasmania

Career statistics
Competition	FC
Matches	23
Runs scored	985
Batting average	24.02
100s/50s	1/5
Top score	121
Catches/stumpings	19/–
- Source: Cricinfo, 5 August 2026

Geoffrey William Martin (7 March 1896 – 7 March 1968) was an Australian cricketer. He played 23 first-class matches for Tasmania between 1921 and 1933.

Martin was an aggressive batsman who scored 121 in 126 minutes for Tasmania against the touring English team in 1924–25, and 92 when the English team toured in 1928–29.

== See also ==
- List of Tasmanian representative cricketers
