= Stefan Pokorny (designer) =

American designer, artist, film producer and businessman

- Born: Keu soon Inn; December 25, 1966 (age 59); Seoul, South Korea
- Education: Hartford Art School (MFA, 1992)
- Known for: Product Design, painting, sculpture, cinema, photography
- Movement: Role-playing games
- Employer: Dwarven Forge

Stefan Alexander Pokorny is an American designer and artist, known for his origination and popularization of miniature three-dimensional terrain systems, now widely used in role-playing games (RPG) including Dungeons & Dragons.

== Early life ==
At age 2½, Pokorny was adopted by New York architect Jan Hird Pokorny (1914–2008) and his wife Marise Angelucci-Pokorny. Pokorny has played Dungeons and Dragons since the 1980s and has said that he discovered Dungeons and Dragons at the age of nine or ten while he was away at a three-month sleepover camp. He attributes his introduction to one of his camp counselors who was a member of The Judges Guild.

== Career ==
In 1996, Pokorny co-founded Dwarven Forge to manufacture and distribute his designs for the first fully modular 3-D terrain systems for games. The company rose to prominence in 2013 when it raised $2 million with its first Kickstarter campaign. Several other Kickstarters followed that equalled or surpassed that mark. The business model Pokorny developed continues to fund operations as of 2023, with over $23 million raised to date.

Pokorny was the subject of the 2016 documentary feature film, The Dwarvenaut, exploring him and his role-playing alter ego, The Dwarvenaut. Reviews for the film were mixed noting that the film focused on the story of turning an idea into a business and less on the personal aspects of Pokorny as a person (such as his girlfriend) or the actual way in which his business functions claiming the film began to "feel more like a commercial than a documentary."

== Design and influence ==
Prior to Pokorny's innovation, D&D was generally played on 2-dimensional maps drawn on graph or grid paper, with miniature player pieces. Pokorny's terrains add elaborate 3-D aspects to the environment of play. To achieve his design objectives, Pokorny developed a proprietary PVC-based casting material he calls Dwarvenite^{®}. Users report it is fairly indestructible and holds its finish well.

== Publications ==
- Pokorny, Stefan (2015). Dungeons, Maps, Drawings and Other Secret Arcana. Independent (Alphabet). ISBN 978-1-4951-8438-3.
