= Geoff Martin (Australian footballer) =

Australian rules footballer

Personal information
- Full name: Geoff Martin
- Born: 25 June 1958 (age 68)
- Original team: Mildura
- Height: 180 cm (5 ft 11 in)
- Weight: 70 kg (154 lb)

Playing career^{1}
Years	Club	Games (Goals)
1981, 1983	Richmond	6 (3)
- ^{1} Playing statistics correct to the end of 1983.

Geoff Martin (born 25 June 1958) is a former Australian rules footballer who played with Richmond in the Victorian Football League (VFL).
