= Architectural metals =

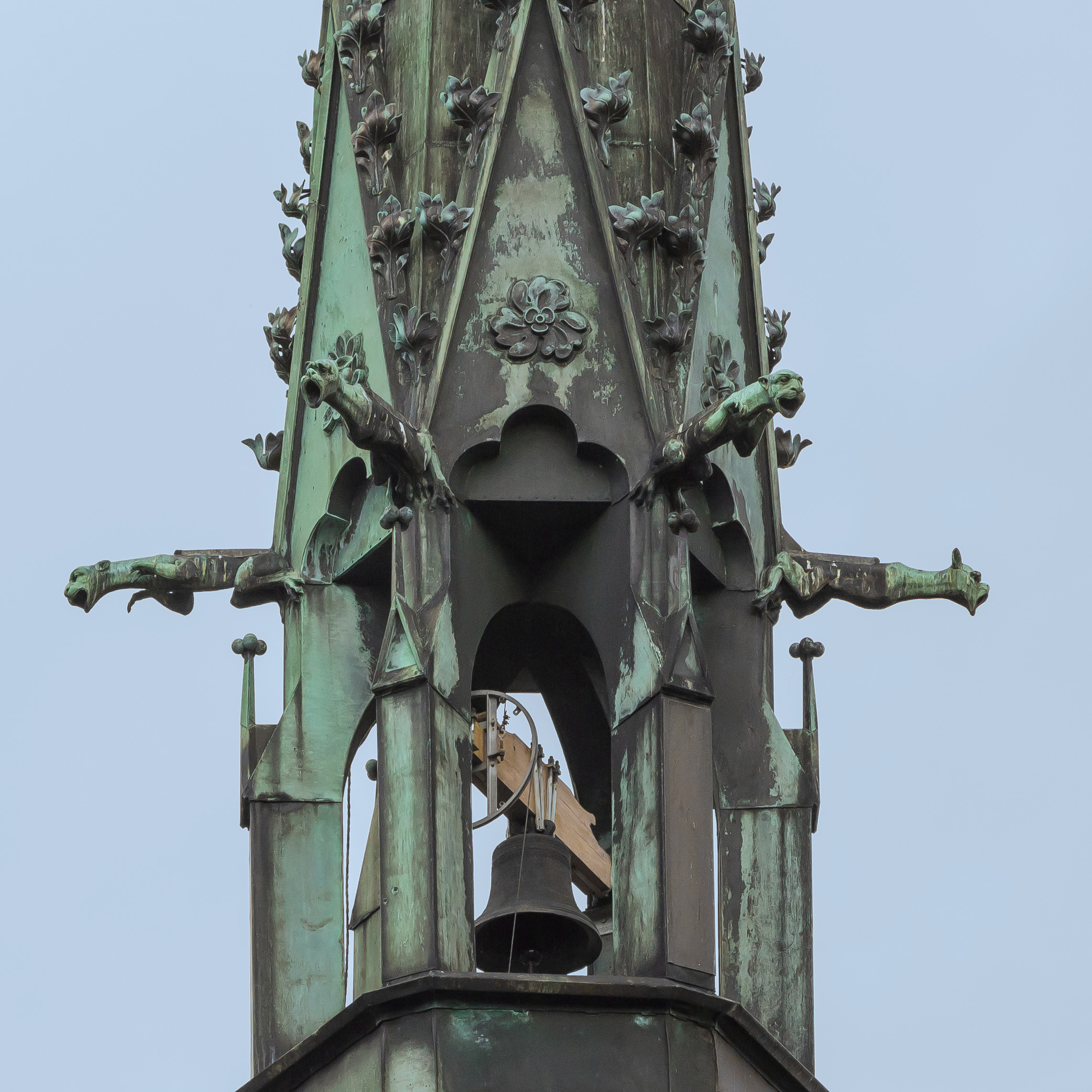
Copper belfry of St. Laurentius church, Bad Neuenahr-Ahrweiler

Metals used for architectural purposes include lead, for water pipes, roofing, and windows; tin, formed into tinplate; zinc, copper and aluminium, in a range of applications including roofing and decoration; and iron, which has structural and other uses in the form of cast iron or wrought iron, or made into steel. Metal alloys used in building include bronze (mainly copper and tin); brass (copper and zinc); monel metal and nickel silver, mainly consisting of nickel and copper; and stainless steel, with important components of nickel and chromium.

== Metal types ==
=== Lead ===
The low melting point of lead permitted its use on a wide scale throughout human history. Lead was one of the first to be made into sheet metal for architectural purposes. Water pipes were frequently constructed of lead, until its health hazards were publicised in the late 19th century.

Lead is not subject to rust and has been a popular roofing material for centuries, being used for roofing, flashing, gutters, downspouts, and conductor heads. Lead was best suited for low-pitched roofs, as steep roofs experienced creep. Lead roofs in regions with large temperature fluctuations, such as the mid-Atlantic states, experienced deterioration from constant expansion and contraction, called fatigue. Beginning in the 19th century, a roofing material called “terne” or “terneplate” was used, consisting of sheet iron or sheet steel coated with a lead-tin alloy. It is frequently confused with tinplate.

Lead came was also frequently used for window panes in skylights and stained glass. It was also used for small pieces of sculpture and garden ornamentation. Lead was frequently added to paint, with red lead used as an anti-corrosive pigment for iron, and white lead used as paint for wooden houses. Lead-based paint was one of the most durable materials developed as a protective exterior coating. The use of lead paint has been restricted on most buildings, due to concerns of lead poisoning.

=== Tin ===
Tin is too soft to be used by itself for architectural purposes so it generally falls into two categories: the alloying of tin with other metals such as copper to form bronze, and the coating of tin on harder metals, such as tinplated iron or steel. Architectural bronzes usually contain about 90% copper and 10% tin, although the content may vary widely. The term “tin ceiling” is a misnomer and early manufacturers did not use the name. However, persons who worked with sheet metal were called tinsmiths, so the term could have sprung from this title.

Tinplate was a type of architectural material consisting of sheet iron or steel coated with tin. “Tin roofs,” a type of tinplate, was originally used for armor but eventually as a roofing material. Tinplate was also used for decoration, such as ornamental windows, door lintels and tin ceilings. Ornamental stamped metal made from tinplate was an affordable alternative to plasterwork. Although tinplate is still available today for ceilings, roofing and flashing, it is generally considered expensive since the initial cost is more than that for common modern roofing types such as asphalt shingles or built-up roofs. A well-maintained tinplate roof or ceiling typically lasts several times longer than modern materials, and is more economical when the longer lifespan is taken into account.

=== Zinc ===
Pure zinc was used for roofing in Belgium, France and Germany, where it replaced more expensive copper and lead in roofing. Starting in the 1820s, Belgian sheet zinc was imported in America, used by builders in New York City and elsewhere. Pure zinc is subject to creep at ordinary temperatures.

Zinc-coated metals were first patented in 1837, separately by M. Sorel in France and H. W. Crawford in England. The methods employed a “hot dipping” process to coat sheet iron with zinc. By 1839 “galvanized” sheet iron roofing was being used in New York City. The Merchant's Exchange in Manhattan was one of the first buildings to have both a galvanized roof and galvanized gutters. Some galvanized sheet roofing was pressed with designs, a popular technique in the Victorian era.

Zinc was also cast for sculptures and decorative elements in Germany and Austria as early as 1832. Decorative architectural elements were frequently cast in zinc, since it molded readily, was inexpensive compared to stone, and could be painted to imitate more expensive metals. Stamped swags, rosettes, fleur-de-lis and acanthus leaves provided popular decorative ornamentation of both exteriors and interiors by the late 19th century.

Zinc oxide paints were nontoxic and resistant to pollution. They became commercially successful and readily available in America in about 1850 and used widely starting around the 1870s. They had the added benefit of being good rust inhibitors on iron and steel.

During the early decades of the 20th century, the use of pure zinc roofing and ornament decreased in use in the US. It is now gaining popularity in its pure form (99.95%)for building materials. Typically, architectural grade zinc is 99.995 percent pure zinc with trace amounts of titanium, to reduce coefficient of thermal expansion and improve tensile strength and hardness, and copper to improve workability. Exact alloy composition is subject to manufacturer and is a color determinant in zinc's final patina. Over time, zinc develops its distinctive patina, transforming from a shiny silver to a matte bluish-grey. Pre patinated finishes are available from certain manufacturers to expedite the natural patination process. Applying a clear protective coating to brass surfaces can inhibit oxidation and reduce the rate of patina development, helping to maintain the original appearance. Zinc is still used in alloys such as brass and nickel silver, and in the electroplating of steel as well. Today, galvanized steel and pure zinc material, usually Double Locked Standing Seam panels, are used for roofing a variety of buildings. Creep has been reduced by the introduction of titanium in most architectural zinc available in North America. Galvanized nails and sheet metal ducts are also common.

Architectural grade zinc is 90 to 95% recycled. Replacement costs are negligible with a long lifetime of 80 to 100 years for zinc roofing and 200 to 300 years for wall systems. This long-life durability is a key component in durability. At the end of its service life, zinc building products can be recycled indefinitely without loss to chemical or physical properties. The use of architectural grade zinc can help building qualify for LEED certification due to its high recycled content and sustainability.

=== Copper and its alloys ===
Copper is a very durable metal, withstanding corrosion when forming a bluish-green patina that variably consists of copper carbonates, sulfates, sulfides, and chlorides. Sheet copper used as roofing is lighter than wooden shingles and much lighter than slate, tile, or lead. Roofing copper can be folded readily into waterproof seams, or shaped over curved frameworks for cupolas and domes.

The initial cost of copper was traditionally high, but its length of service more than compensated for the price. Copper could also be shaped to the bends and angles around chimneys and at roof edges and dormers. All nails, screws, bolts, and cleats used with sheet copper must be made of copper or a copper alloy, otherwise galvanic action between the dissimilar metals would occur, causing deterioration.

Copper was also used for decorative purposes, including architectural ornaments, siding, ceilings or sculptures. One famous example is the Statue of Liberty.

Copper alloys used in architecture include bronze, an alloy of copper and tin, and brass, an alloy of copper and zinc.

=== Nickel and its alloys ===
Although somewhat rare, nickel has been used for plating architectural details. Nickel is most frequently used for building components in the form of alloys: nickel silver, Monel metal, and stainless steel.

Nickel silver was originally called “German Silver,” until World War I. It has been called “white brass” but probably should be termed “nickel brass,” because it generally contains 75% copper, 20% nickel, and 5% zinc. Different percentages result in a range of colors, including silvery-white, yellow, slight blue, green or pink. Nickel silver hardware was popular in the US during the Art Deco and Depression Modern periods. Architects and designers preferred nickel silver because it could take and retain appropriate finishes, and it resisted corrosion.

Monel metal is an alloy of approximately two-thirds nickel and one-third copper. It is similar to platinum in color. Monel pioneered many of the present uses of stainless steel. The first architectural use of Monel was for roofing the Pennsylvania Railroad Terminal in New York City in 1909. In 1936, the copper roof on the New York City Public Library at Fifth Avenue and 42nd Street was replaced with a Monel metal roof. Its advantages as a roofing material included its ability to be brazed, welded, or soldered in place to provide a watertight, continuous cover. Monel was popular during the Art Deco periods. During World War II large quantities of nickel and copper were diverted to the war effort, and the supply of Monel was greatly reduced. Following the war, stainless steel and aluminium replaced Monel because of lower production costs.

=== Iron and its alloys ===
Iron has become an important architectural building component. It has been used in four common forms: wrought iron, cast iron, sheet iron, and steel.

Wrought iron was used for minor structural and decorative elements starting in the 18th century. Until the mid-19th century, the use of wrought iron in buildings was generally limited to small items such as tie rods, straps, nails, and hardware, or to decorative ironwork in balconies, railings fences and gates. Around 1850 its structural use became more widespread as iron mills began to roll rails, bulb-tees, and eventually I-beams. It was also used for decorative purposes, such as ornamental balconies or hardware. Since wrought iron is handmade, no two pieces are identical.

Cast iron was a major 19th century building material of the Industrial Revolution. Although brittle, it is remarkably strong in compression. It was frequently used for structural purposes, such as columns, building fronts, domes and light courts. Decorative uses have included stairs, elevators, lintels, grilles, verandas, balconies, railings, fences, streetlights, and tombs. The Bradbury Building is an example of extensive decorative cast iron. Today, cast iron is used for plumbing fixtures and piping in new construction, and its structural and decorative use is used occasionally through historic preservation practices.

Sheet iron can be subject to rapid corrosion, forming rust. Sheet iron was used throughout the 19th century, although it is not clear how widespread sheet iron roofs became. Pressed decorative sheet iron used for ceilings was frequently called a “tin ceiling,” which was actually sheets of iron dipped in molten tin to prevent them from rusting.

Steel was introduced to the construction industry at the end of the 19th century. The development of structural steel in the mid-19th century allowed construction of tall buildings. Builders and manufacturers turned to steel, which was stronger than cast iron in compression and wrought iron in tension. When the Bessemer process was developed in England in 1856, and the open-hearth process was invented, steel was produced in a quantity that allowed it to be economical. Bridges, railroad companies, and skyscrapers were among the first large-scale uses of structural steel. Although iron and steel are not combustible, they lose strength in a fire if they are not protected from the heat. Almost all structural steel must be “fireproofed” in some manner, utilizing a cladding of terra-cotta, tile, plaster-poured concrete, sprayed concrete, or sprayed insulation. Ferro concrete, also called reinforced concrete, was developed in the late 19th century when steel wire was added to concrete.

Decorative steels used in buildings include:

- Stainless steel, a chromium-nickel steel, developed between 1903 and 1912. Its most important property is its resistance to corrosion. It contains about 18% chromium and 8-12% nickel. Stainless steel is expensive, so it was used primarily as a nonstructural metal or where there is a high potential for corrosion. One of the most extensive early uses of stainless steel was in the Chrysler Building.
- Copper-bearing steels, containing from .15% to .25% copper, develop increased resistance to atmospheric corrosion, when compared to ordinary steel, by forming a protective oxide coating, having a uniform deep brown color and texture. Eero Saarinen experimented with the material in the John Deere building in 1964.

=== Aluminium ===
Much like copper, Aluminium is highly resistant to corrosion. It also has the added benefit of being a third lighter than steel with comparable strength. Aluminium can also be easily and repeatedly recycled. It has been estimated that of the estimated 900 million tonnes of aluminium produced since 1880, three quarters is still in productive use, 35% of which is in building construction.

Aluminium was unavailable at reasonable cost or in sufficient quantities for general architectural use until after the beginning of the 20th century. Architectural use of aluminum increased in the 1920s, mainly for decorative detailing. It was used for roofing, flashing, gutters, downspouts, wall panels, and spandrels. Art Deco designs frequently used aluminum for ornamental features. The first extensive use of aluminum in construction was the Empire State Building, where the entire tower portion is aluminum, as well as many decorative features, such as the entrances, elevator doors, ornamental trim, and some 6,000 window spandrels. Today, aluminum is used frequently in construction except major structural members.

== See also ==
- Building materials

== Sources ==
- Gayle, Margot and Waite, John G. (1980), Metals in America's Historic Buildings: Uses and Preservation Treatments, Washington: U.S. Dept. of the Interior, Heritage Conservation and Recreation.
