= Geoffrey K. Martin =

American mathematician

Geoffrey K. Martin is a mathematician currently advising in the field of mathematical physics. Martin is also the Associate Professor and Chair of the mathematics department at the University of Toledo. His fields of study include differential geometry, relativity, and the foundations of physics. Martin earned his Ph.D. at the Stony Brook University in 1983. Geoffrey is the son of horticulturists Joy Lee Martin and Ernest Martin who owned Logee's Greenhouses.
