= True Adventures =

Role-playing game company

True Adventures, Ltd., is a role-playing game company started by Jeff Martin. It operates two entertainment venues at Gen Con Indy: True Dungeon and True Dungeon Fantasy Tavern. True Adventures is notable because their signature event, True Dungeon, is "the single most popular event" at Gen Con, drawing people to the convention just for it. The event is also notable for its scale; about 3,000 players play in groups of up to eight people (later increased to ten) over four days each year. The company also hosted the event True Heroes in 2004 and 2005. True Adventures ran these events at Gen Con SoCal when the convention was still in existence. The company grew out of Martin's work in creating elaborate props and puzzles for his Dungeons & Dragons game.

== True Dungeon ==
Although True Dungeon shares some characteristics with live action roleplaying (LARP) games, the game's developers don't consider it a LARP. While players are free to role-play particular characters, True Dungeon does not emphasize role-playing aspects; characters lack backgrounds and names. Instead characters primarily are collections of spells and statistics useful for solving puzzles and battling opponents. The rules mechanics are loosely based on those of Dungeons & Dragons. Combat is played out by sliding weapon counters along a waist-high shuffleboard table. True Dungeon focuses on riddle and puzzle solving along with the shuffle board combat system.

Jeff Martin originally ran yearly immersive games of this sort for groups of friends. Gen Con owner Peter Adkison was invited to one of these events, then running under the name "Jeff Con" for about 30 people. After his experience, Adkison invited Martin to run the game at Gen Con after participating in one of Martin's events. True Dungeon was first run at Gen Con Indy in 2003. The first event was arranged at the last minute; there was no promotion and tickets were not in Gen Con's system.

The events takes about 100 volunteers to run. The 2006 event supplies filled two semi-trailers.

Equipment for player characters exists in the form of "treasure tokens". These are marked plastic tokens indicating various pieces of traditional Dungeons & Dragons equipment. Examples include rope, small steel mirrors, weapons, and armor. In 2005 players were given a random weapon and random armor; they were expected to trade within their group to optimize their equipment usage. In 2006 players were given a random bag of 10 tokens. Since the game began players could also purchase additional bags of random tokens. There is a substantial after-market for these tradable tokens.

True Dungeon provides an interactive environment, complete with multiple solutions to many problems. There are a small number of NPCs as the plot requires. Players move through various rooms in the game world. Each room contains a challenge in either the form of a puzzle, a fight, or both. The puzzles can be very difficult and the game has a high rate of character death, although the game's lethality has dropped over the years. Jeff Martin said of the 2004 Gen Con Indy game that only 20% of characters survived, while in 2005 42% did.

Closer to live action role-playing, players are expected to physically explore their surroundings, not simply describing interactions with the gamemaster Many interactions do require gamemaster interaction, with some details of the environment described to players by the gamemaster assigned to each room.

The first few years, each group of players were accompanied by a gamemaster throughout the dungeon. In 2005, this was switched to having a gamemaster assigned to each room to ensure more consistent rulings for a given room.

To maximize throughput of players, each room of the dungeon has a group of players in it. Groups all advance to the next room simultaneously. As a result, each room has a hard time limit. If players finish early, they must wait for the time limit to expire before advancing. If the players are too slow, they are penalized hit points and are moved into the next room. The plot for each dungeon usually provides a reason for the time limit. One year the plot specified that the characters were fleeing lizardmen. Sometimes the rooms themselves explain the time limit; in 2005 one room had a moving wall that would crush characters who failed to open the locked door into the next room quickly enough.

Player success in True Dungeon (and True Heroes) is tracked in the form of experience points. Players with larger numbers of Experience Points (or XP) are given levels. These levels have no impact on the gameplay, but offer benefits outside of the game.

== Events ==
In 2005 two different adventures were run in parallel: "Battle Below Castle Greyhawk" and "Assault Above Castle Greyhawk". In the last room of one of the adventures players could send a brief message to the other adventure, a clue to help the second party complete their last room. Players were free to play both adventures.

In 2006 two very similar copies of the same adventure, "Escape from the Spider Cult", were run in parallel, effectively doubling the number of slots available for players. The playable classes were also expanded to include Barbarian, Druid, and Monk, in addition to the previous Wizard, Cleric, Fighter, Rogue, Ranger and Bard.

In 2007, again two very similar copies of the same adventure, "Race Across Greyhawk", were run in parallel. But this year, one dungeon was more combat oriented while the other was more puzzle oriented. This year also marked the addition of live monsters to the game including a shambling mound, a medusa, and a stone golem.

2008's adventure was entitled "Hope of the Lost." The plot line had the players infiltrating a temple of Pelor that had been taken over by evil forces. Again two versions were run in parallel, a "combat" version and a "puzzle" version. Like 2005's game, groups on the two paths had to work together at the very end to win. Unlike the 2005 year, the two teams actually joined up in the same room. The puzzle group had to solve a puzzle while the combat group had to fight a monster. Both groups had to succeed to win.

In 2009 True Adventures ran four events. "Five Aspects" was a revised version of the original 2004 game. "Smoak" was a new full length event. "Getting In" was a shorter event. "True Grind" was an all combat event.

In 2010 True Adventures ran three events. "The Evading Hilt" offered 1,500 tickets, "DragonWard" offered 3,000 tickets and the True Grind event offered around 300 tickets.

In 2011 True Adventures ran three events. "Lair of the Sea-Lich", "Dragon's Redoubt" and the True Grind.

In 2012 True Adventures ran three events. "Giants' Travail", "Draco-Lich Undone" and the True Grind.

In 2013 True Adventures ran three events for total of 7,500 tickets available. "Lycans Afoot" available in Puzzle and Combat versions, "Golembane" available in Puzzle and Combat versions, and the True Grind. Lycans Afoot and Golembane offer 4 levels of challenge: Non-Lethal, Normal, Hardcore, and Nightmare.

In 2014 True Adventures ran two events ("Flight of the Zephyr", "Into the Viper's Pit") and the True Grind.

In 2015 True Adventures ran a retro event ("Decent into the Underdark") at Who's Yer Con and a True Grind. True dungeon also premiered two new events (Into the Underdark & Sable Gauntlet) and a grind at Gen con.

In 2016 True Adventures ran a retro event at Gamehole Con ("Deeperdark redux") and a True Grind. True dungeon also premiered two new events (Behold Her Majesty & Into the Deeperdark) and a grind at Gen con.

In 2017 True Adventures ran a solo anniversary convention (True dungeon celebration) at which they presented a retro event ("Beneath Castle Altus"), and a massive "raid style" event called True horde. True Adventures also attended Origins Game Fair rerunning their 2016 adventures and premiered two new dungeons and a grind event at Gencon (The Moongate Maze & Dancing Among Stones) based on Patrick Rothfuss Kingkiller Chronicle world.

In 2018 True Adventures began their season at Origins game fair offering a final showing of their 2017 "Kingkiller: adventures and premiering the first of their N series modules ("Astral Journey to the Bliss"), they also offered two patron only events. A best of dungeon called "Into the shadowlands" and another showing of the true horde raid. All 3 main N series modules ("Astral Journey to the Bliss","Odin's Haven", and "The Vault of the all father") as well a TrueGrind event ("To Pandemonium and Back") and a seal deck throwback of the 2014 adventure "Into the Viper's Pit" were offered at gencon.

In 2019 True Adventures again began their season at Origins game fair premiering a new module ("The Abyssal Swamp"). The Abyssal Swamp along with 2 new modules ("Path of death", "Infernal Redoubt") were also offered at gencon.

In 2020 True Adventures announced plans for 3 new modules in their S series ("Weird Magic","Darkhold Keep","Tomb of Terror") along with a best of adventure called "Odin's Redux". However these were delayed due to the unspecified virus of unknown origins suspending in person conventions. Instead True adventures offered the first 3 in a series of 5 announced virtual adventures over zoom ("Nymph & Nimblewit", "Thornbarb Pass","The Deadwill Mine").

In 2021 True Adventures completed the last 2 modules in the initial virtual series ("Mistress of the Marsh", "Ashwind Abbey"). True adventures has announced they will not be attending Origins or Gencon in 2021, they currently plan to attend Gamehole con assuming conditions allow. They have also announced plans for 3 additional adventures ("V6 – The Bogwood Beast", "R1 – Felurian's Feast" and "Vx – Shyport Sinister").

== True Dungeon Fantasy Tavern ==
In 2005, True Dungeon added a tavern area in front of the True Dungeon adventures proper. The area is decorated as a stereotypical fantasy tavern. Drinks are available for purchase. The area is intended to be a fantasy-themed area for gamers to congregate and socialize. It also acts as a staging area for players waiting for their session of True Dungeon. A shuffle board is available to practice combat, and many players meet here to trade tokens.

In 2006 players with a ticket for the day's event could enter the tavern. Any player with enough Experience Points to be fourth level could also enter. Anyone else wishing to enter needed to pay a fee.

== Story Arcs ==
True Adventure modules thus far have been broken into 3 story arcs.

"The Evading Hilt", which ended with players challenging a dragon and gaining the materials to craft an item called "The Medallion of Gray hawk"

"The Missing Dwarfs of Icecrag keep", which ended with the players challenging a Dracolich and crafting a Rod of Seven Parts

"The Teeth of Cavadar", ongoing.

== True Craft ==
True Craft was a quest based mini game that took place during the True Dungeon event held at Gen Con 2012. Players could turn in True craft tokens to costumed NPCs in order to participate in carnival styled games which could grant in game bonuses during the main True Dungeon events held that year.

== True Heroes ==
True Heroes was a superhero-themed game that is played much like True Dungeon. It was produced in conjunction with Upper Deck Entertainment and Marvel Comics. Combat involved throwing small balls containing magnets at metal targets. Combat also used aspects of Upper Deck's "VS System". True Heroes operated at Gen Con Indy and So Cal in 2004 and 2005 before being cancelled.
