= National Register of Historic Places listings in Rowan County, Kentucky =

Location of Rowan County in Kentucky

This is a list of the National Register of Historic Places listings in Rowan County, Kentucky.

This is intended to be a complete list of the properties and districts on the National Register of Historic Places in Rowan County, Kentucky, United States. The locations of National Register properties and districts for which the latitude and longitude coordinates are included below, may be seen in a map.

There are 14 properties and districts listed on the National Register in the county.

This National Park Service list is complete through NPS recent listings posted March 21, 2025.

== Current listings ==
	Name on the Register	Image	Date listed	Location	City or town	Description
1	Brushy Voting House No. 6		April 9, 1998 (#98000340)	Junction of Kentucky Route 32 and Spruce St. 38°13′55″N 83°29′57″W	Morehead	
2	Cranston Voting House No. 12		April 9, 1998 (#98000344)	Junction of Clear Fork Rd. and Kentucky Route 377; 38°15′49″N 83°26′10″W	Morehead	
3	Downtown Morehead Historic District	Downtown Morehead Historic District	May 11, 2022 (#100006264)	Roughly bounded by South Hargis Ave., West 1st, East 1st, Bridge, East Main, and East 2nd Sts., North Wilson Ave., and West Main St. 38°10′50″N 83°26′10″W	Morehead	55 contributing buildings in Morehead's 1881 original downtown area
4	Farmers Voting House No. 2		April 9, 1998 (#98000337)	Kentucky Route 801, 0.1 miles south of Farmers; 38°08′43″N 83°32′43″W	Morehead	
5	Haldeman Voting House No. 8	Haldeman Voting House No. 8	April 9, 1998 (#98000342)	Kentucky Route 174; 38°14′37″N 83°19′24″W	Morehead	
6	Hayes Voting House No. 16	Hayes Voting House No. 16	April 9, 1998 (#98000346)	Little Perry Rd., near the junction with Kentucky Route 60; 38°14′30″N 83°21′03″W	Morehead	
7	Hogtown Voting House No. 4		April 9, 1998 (#98000338)	Williamstown Rd. 38°10′50″N 83°16′28″W	Morehead	
8	Morehead Chesapeake and Ohio Railway Freight Depot	Morehead Chesapeake and Ohio Railway Freight Depot	February 12, 2016 (#16000013)	130 E. 1st St. 38°10′53″N 83°26′00″W	Morehead	
9	Morehead State University	Morehead State University	November 25, 1994 (#94001381)	Bounded by University Boulevard, Battson Ave. and Ward Oates Dr. 38°11′12″N 83°26′04″W	Morehead	
10	Morehead Voting House No. 7	Morehead Voting House No. 7	April 9, 1998 (#98000341)	Clearfield St. 38°10′19″N 83°26′14″W	Morehead	
11	Morehead Voting House No. 10	Morehead Voting House No. 10	April 9, 1998 (#98000343)	Junction of Knapp and W. 2nd St. 38°10′50″N 83°26′21″W	Morehead	
12	Pine Grove Voting House No. 5		April 9, 1998 (#98000339)	Rock Fork Rd., 0.5 miles north of Kentucky Route 377; 38°17′13″N 83°24′49″W	Morehead	
13	Plank Voting House No. 15		April 9, 1998 (#98000345)	815 Plank Chapel Rd. 38°19′28″N 83°23′43″W	Morehead	
14	Rowan County Courthouse	Rowan County Courthouse	July 21, 1983 (#83002862)	Main St. 38°11′03″N 83°26′00″W	Morehead	Boundary increase approved March 13, 2017; Now Rowan County Arts Center

== See also ==
- List of National Historic Landmarks in Kentucky
- National Register of Historic Places listings in Kentucky
