= Voting house =

American vernacular architecture

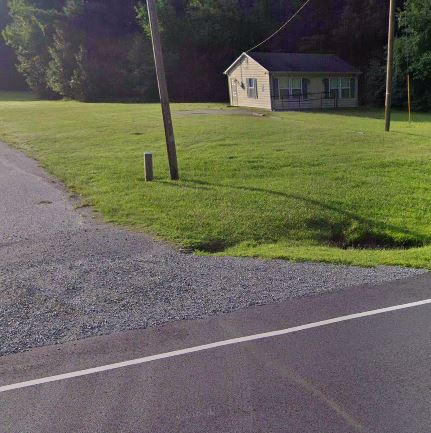
Voting house on Skippers Road, Emporia, Virginia

A voting house, sometimes called an election house, polling house, or a voting hall, is a type of American vernacular architecture used by local governments in rural areas of the United States as a polling station. Dedicated voting houses have been used since the second half of the 19th century. The advent of modern voting machines contributed to the obsolescence of voting houses.

== Description and history ==
The purpose of a voting house was, generally speaking, to reduce travel time for rural voters who would otherwise have to leave their farms or worksites to go to polling places in distant courthouses and/or to minimize the distractions and disorder that came from using trying to hold an election in a working schoolhouse or similar public facility. As a class, voting houses have been described as a seemingly "innocuous and non-descript" building type. Voting houses were often constructed with locally available materials, such as New Deal-era WPA-built voting houses in Kentucky that were made with "native stone." This characteristic may be a factor in potential architectural restoration work. For example, the Sang Run Election House in Garrett County, Maryland was framed and sided with lumber from "native species, rough cut, and weathered" that could not readily be replaced from mass-market commercial sources. The buildings were invariably one-room structures defined by their modest dimensions; at least one election house was described as a "much smaller" version of the already-small neighboring public library, with its "fine bracketed cornices and a pedimented central entrance with a rectangular transom." Another defining characteristic of the voting house seems to be its dedicated purpose as a polling location, rather than being a building occasionally drafted for such use. For example, in 1970 Monmouth Township, Illinois, "in all Monmouth voting precincts, except No. 1, where ballots are cast on election days at the Warren County Court House, and No. 11, where the township garage is used for voting purposes, each precinct has its own one-room building that serves as a polling place. The small, frame buildings are used only on election days and never for any purpose except voting...Apparently, no one remembers how the custom of building voting houses in Monmouth began, but the houses are kept in good repair under the supervision of G. V. Homer, township supervisor." (The Monmouth Township voting houses were retired in 1978 when new voting machines made them obsolete and they were deemed "too small" to be effectively repurposed.) Similarly, in 1962 the voting house of Midland Township, Gage County, Nebraska was opened up just for caucuses and Election Day:

At first glance it appears to be some type of farm building...The building is only about 12 feet wide and 40 feet long. The morning [of election day], voters and election personnel found it just a little bit cold as it took a while to get the building warmed up. At one end of the polling house there is a big oil stove to help keep temperature comfortable. But even the voters there admit the building isn't exactly air-tight and a little cold freezes the feet. Some of the elder citizens report that this building was built years ago for election purposes. Although it has resemblance to a small school building, it apparently hasn't ever been used for such purposes. The small building takes care of the some 300 eligible voters in the Midland Township.

An example in Saline County, Nebraska was built in the late 19th century with lumber hauled to the site by mules. According to a history published in 1976:

Lincoln Precinct residents took their right to vote so seriously that, sometime between 1885 and the turn of the century (there's no one left alive to remember exactly when), they built the only voting hall ever erected in Saline County. The hall sat exactly halfway between Dorchester and Friend on U.S. 6 in the northern part of the county. It cost about $350 to build more than 80 years ago, according to the best recollections of those who are old enough to know...Inside, the hall was heated with a potbellied stove. A ballot-counting room was partitioned off in one corner. On election days the hall would be staffed by nine persons. On every other day of every year, the hall stood empty. Most other voters in Saline County voted in school houses, but Lincoln Precinct had a voting hall and folks didn't want it used for anything else. When electricity lighted farmhouses in Lincoln Precinct, the power was brought to the hall on election days via an extension cord from a farm 600 feet away.

However, this is not to say that voting houses were always purpose-built. Disused one-room schoolhouses and general stores have been converted into voting halls. Conversely, old voting houses have been repurposed for recreation. In 1924, in Red Lodge, Montana, boosters "secured the permission to use the North Red Lodge precinct voting house for a warming shelter at the [new skating] rink." After the building was moved it was to be "relined and equipped with a stove and benches for the comfort of the skaters."

"Old voting house on the Johnston property, where everyone in Washington County would go to cast their votes during the early 1900s. Leroy, Alabama" (Carol Highsmith, LCCN2010640227)

According to one local historian in Maryland, "Oral histories document that these sites served as important centers of social as well as political activity, with oysters, crabcakes, and fried chicken being sold to hungry voters here on election day." A 1967 memoir of childhood in Rocky Mount, North Carolina described the role of the voting house in that town: "From the monument or the top of the old wall you could look across the field that one year had tobacco and the next year cotton or corn, and see the voting house. This small wood shack, nestled just off Benvenue Road among the trees, helped to make or break many politicians in its day. It was visited by almost every adult and every kid in the neighborhood during election time. Old friends renewed acquaintances, watermelons were eaten, [and] gossip was spread...When we could peek into the place, we watched the grownups get behind a curtain, mark on a piece of paper and place it in a box."

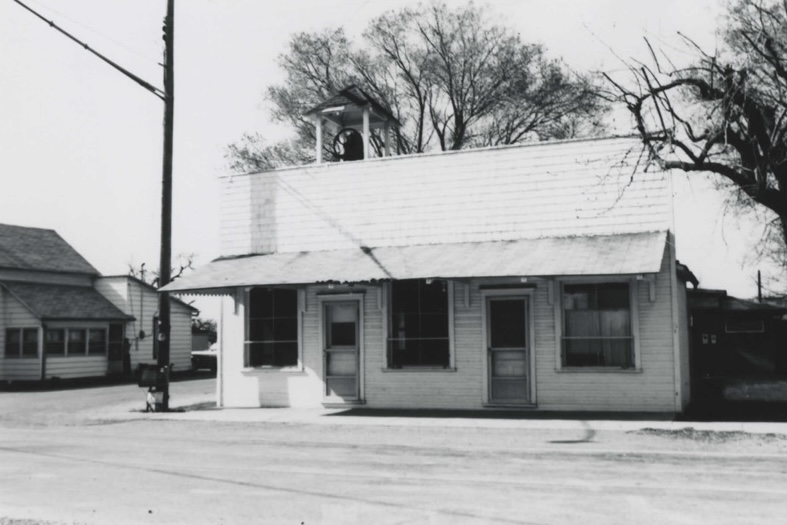
The Washington Township, Franklin County, Ohio voting hall building (photographed April 1977) was built in the 1850s and originally served as a general store.

Voting houses in Maryland were not de jure racially segregated spaces, unusual for certain areas of the late 19th and 20th century in the United States, but de facto segregation meant that in practice voting houses in places like Virginia were primarily or exclusively used by whites.

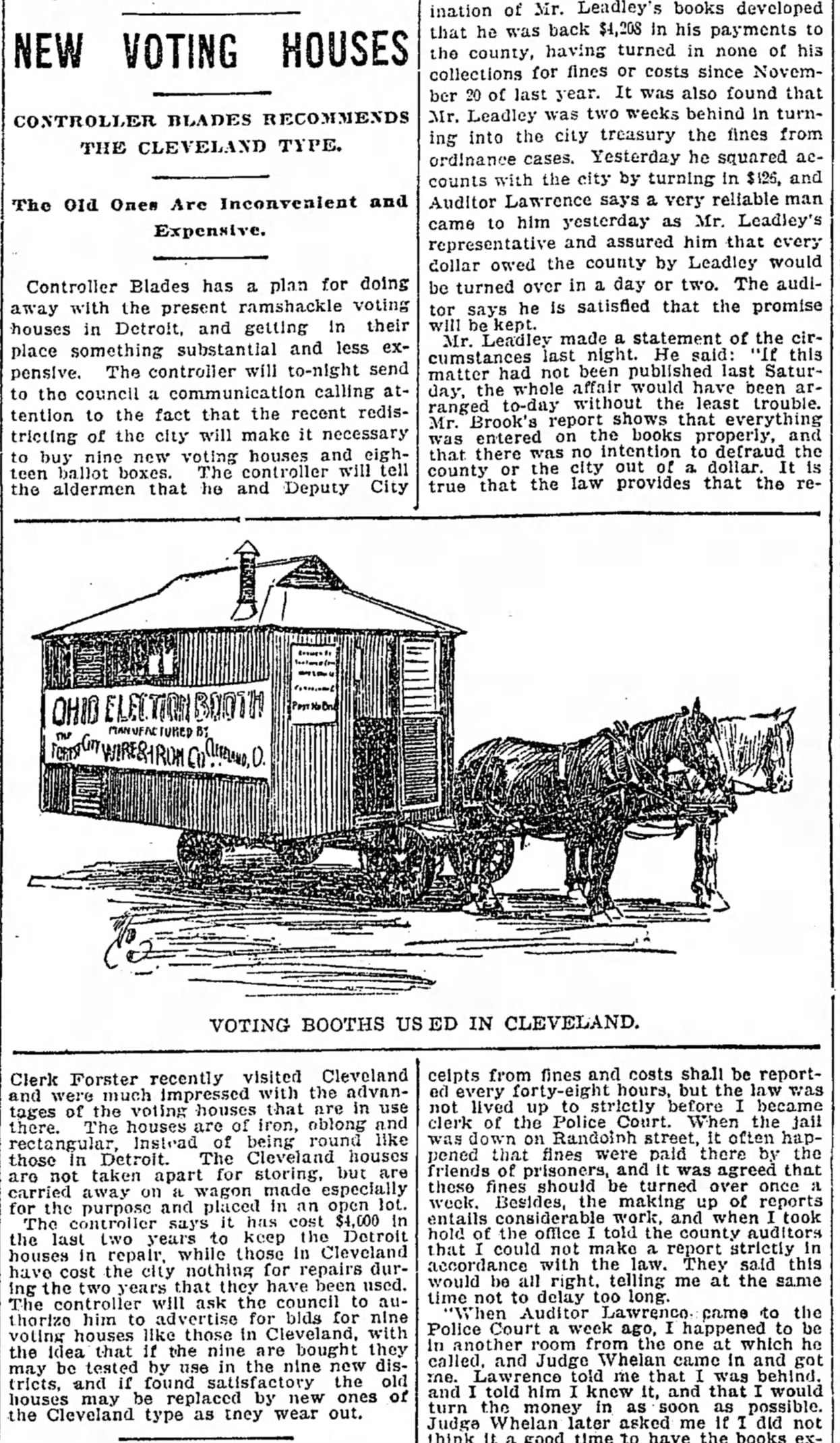
"New Voting Houses" Detroit Free Press, August 24, 1897

Voting houses in early 20th century Orleans County, New York stayed in a county storage yard until Election Day until they were towed by horse-drawn wagons to local voting precincts. One surviving example in Alabama, the Keener Voting House, was a permanent structure even though "many of the early voting houses were built on 'skids' and could be moved from place to place by hitching horses, mules or a tractor to the structure." The Keener Voting House "was furnished with a large table, four straight-back chairs and a shelf for voters to use as they stood and filled in their ballots. There also were two ballot boxes where voters placed their completed ballots." A surviving example in southwestern Virginia is probably somewhat typical of the building form:

We've cleaned it up just a bit, leaving as much original as we can, including the wood stove in the center of the space and the voting booth to one side. We even left up the little shelf where people would have picked up ballots...The structure has a wide-plank floor and bead-board walls that are painted baby blue. At some point, someone wired it for electricity, but it has never been hooked into the grid...Two huge windows face east and west, which gives the building plenty of light, and the glass in the frames is wavy and, thus, perfect.

Window design and placement was intentional in at least some voting houses; the ones constructed in the 1930s in Rowan County, Kentucky "had a trio of 2' x 2' single windows positioned high on the end wall to give light and to insure privacy for citizens voting in the three booths located under each window." Most Maryland election houses "had two doors so that voters could move easily in one door, cast their vote, and exit out the other." According to historian Bill Lattin, New Orleans voting houses were "'always painted battleship grey [and] 'the exit door didn't even have an outside doorknob to prevent people from entering the wrong door and disrupting the voting process.'"

=== Decline ===
In 1905 an Ohio paper complained that the local voting house built in 1862 had become a disgrace: "The house used by the school board and trustees and used as a voting house is one thing however which fails to look creditable to the township officers...for the past 20 years [it] has been used for all sorts of purposes even as a bed room for the bum element which is found every where as the door is seldom closed and has not been locked for 35 years and 16 days." There was a period where of time when animals were living in the Simpson Voting House in Pennsylvania, including a colony of honeybees that moved into one of the walls. The history of one historic voting house in Iowa may be illustrative of the general decline of this type of structure: "Over time, security around its original location was minimal and the building experienced vandalism. The trustees overseeing the building asked MCHS if the building could be moved to the Nelson Pioneer Farm but still be used as the township voting location. The township trustees paid for the building to be moved in 1977 and it continued to be used as the Spring Creek township voting location until 1992." The Lincoln Precinct voting hall in Nebraska was last used in 1970, and after the family of raccoons living under the roof was relocated, the building was moved to the Saline County Museum in 1975 for preservation.

=== Modern use ===
In rural parts of the State of Virginia, a voting house is typically owned by the county in which they are located, for example, Greensville County, Virginia owns the voting house of Precinct 101 of Skippers. Modern voting houses are often used with curbside voting, and are not always accessible by public transportation during election days. The Simpson Voting House in Derry Township, Westmoreland County, Pennsylvania was used for 112 years continuously. It was then closed for 10 years, until a restoration made it safe and disabled-accessible; the building was put back into use in 2013. Some voting houses have been repurposed for other uses, such as an Alabama example that has been moved to a new location and converted into a chapel. One voting house in southwestern Virginia is now used as a farm stand. One Alabama county used the old voting house as a voting-machine training location for election workers, and later granted the Red Cross the use of the building for office space. Other surviving voting houses remain notable landmarks in their otherwise thinly built regions; for example, "The only thing that lets you know you are in Cairo [Mississippi] is the voting house which sits right off 46 and Cairo Cumberland Presbyterian Church...The voting house is used for elections of course, but also by a local group of ladies that hand quilt."

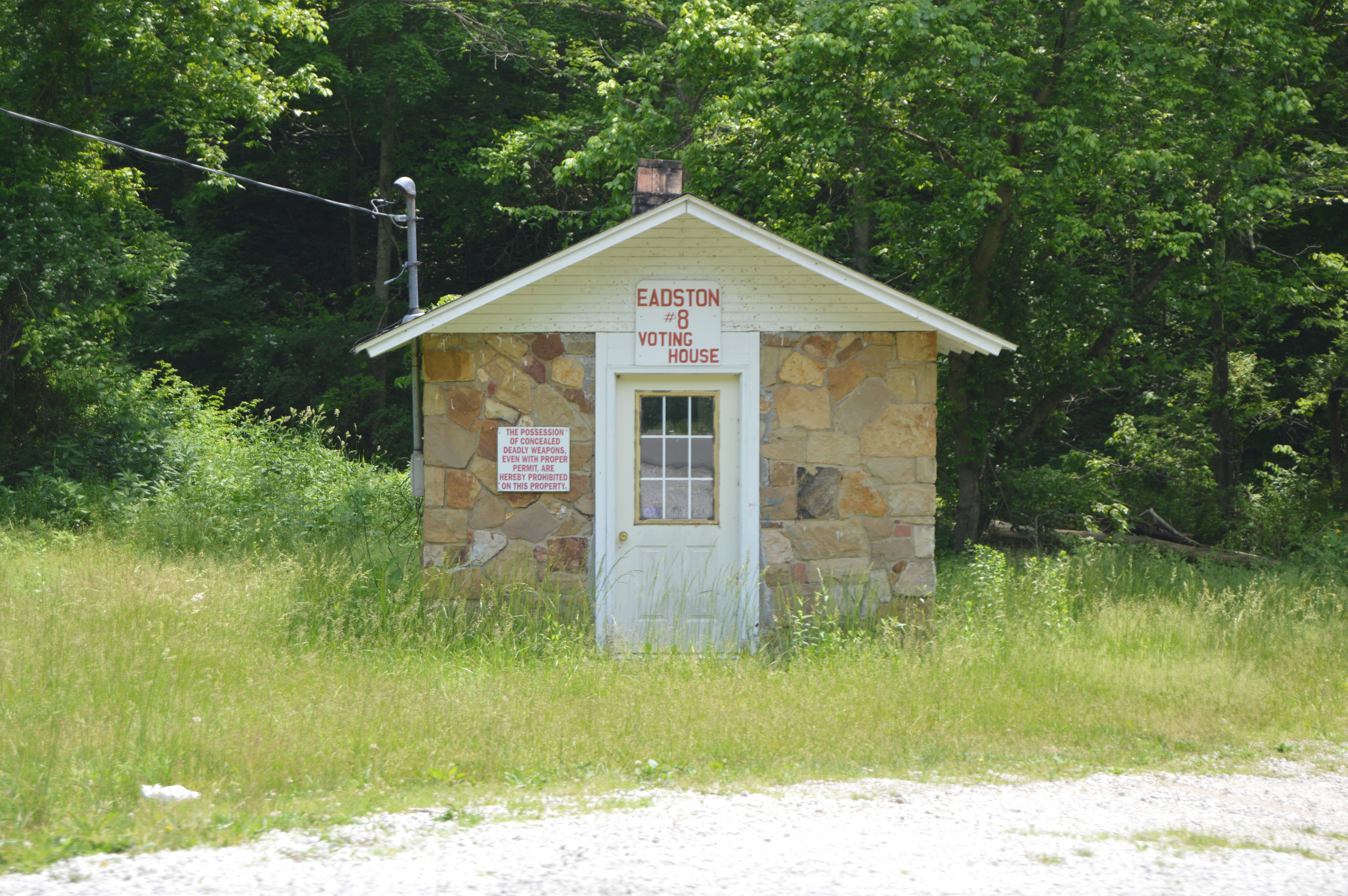
Voting house no. 8, Rowan County, Kentucky

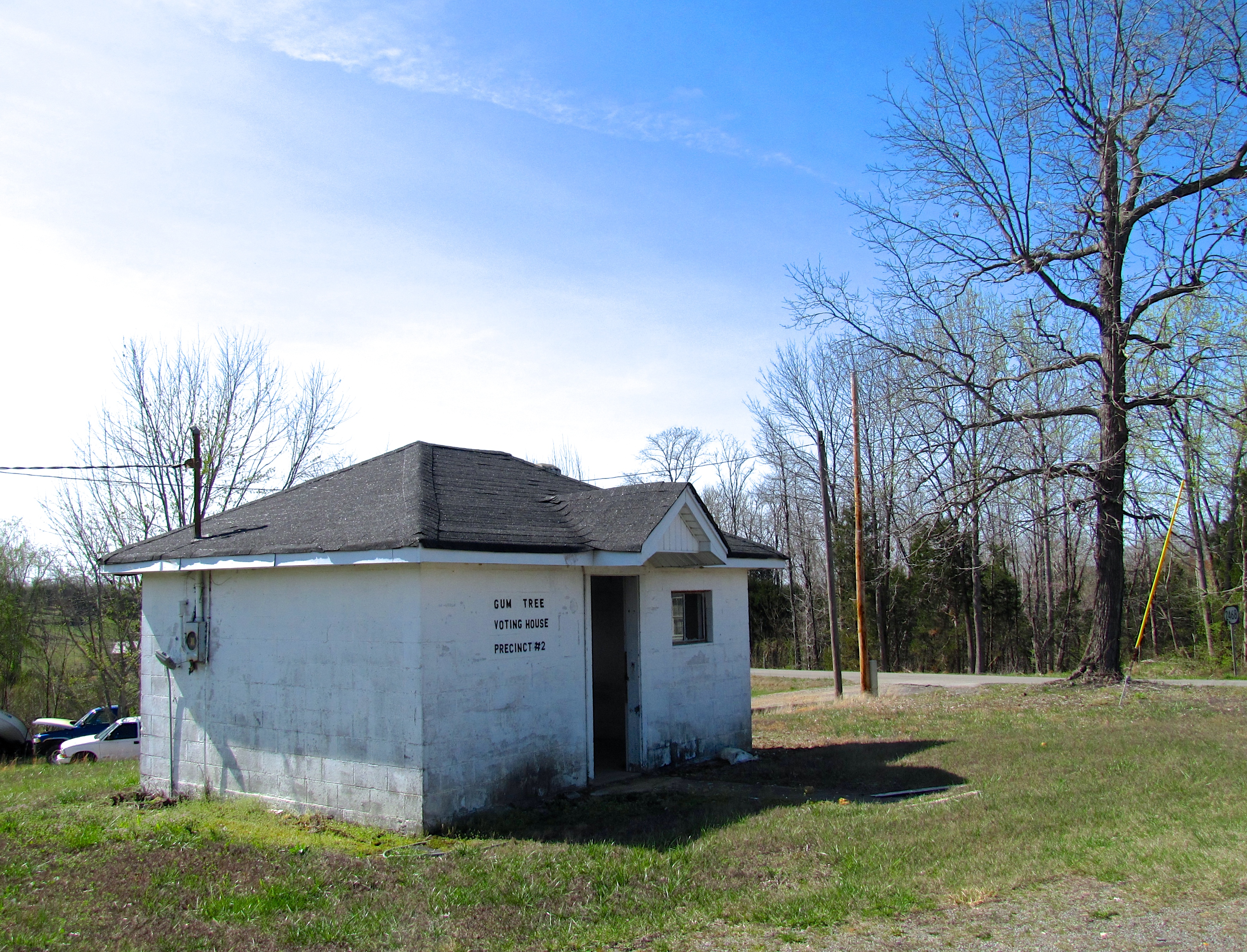
Gum Tree Voting House in the Gum Tree community of Monroe County, Kentucky, United States

== List of surviving voting houses ==
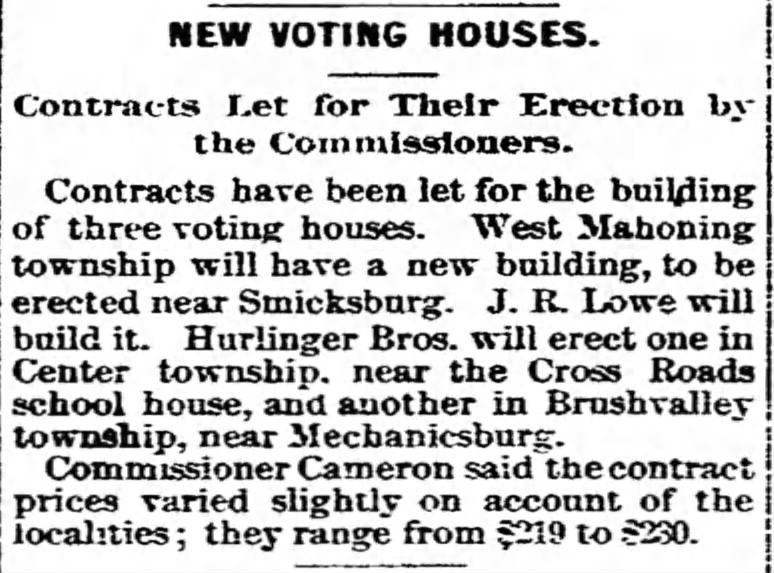
"New Voting Houses" The Indiana Gazette, Indiana, Pennsylvania, September 7, 1892

=== Alabama ===
- Keener Voting House, Etowah County, Alabama

=== Iowa ===
- Spring Creek Voting House, Oskaloosa, Iowa, said to be first voting house constructed west of the Mississippi River

=== Kentucky ===
- Brushy Voting House No. 6
- Cranston Voting House No. 12
- Haldeman Voting House No. 8

=== Maryland ===
- Nutter's District Election House, Maryland
- Princess Anne's Election House, Maryland
- Quantico Election House, Wicomico County, Maryland (moved to Western Fields, Hebron, Maryland)
- Sunderland Polling House, Calvert County, Maryland
- Old St. Leonard Polling House, Calvert County, Maryland
- Sunderland Polling House in Huntingtown, Maryland
- St. Leonard Polling House, Calvert County, Maryland
- Sang Run Election House, Garrett County, Maryland (oldest surviving voting house in Maryland)

=== Nebraska ===
- Lincoln Precinct Voting Hall, Saline County Museum, Dorchester, Nebraska

=== New York ===
- Hamlin Voting House, Cobblestone Museum, Childs, New York

=== Pennsylvania ===
- Simpson Voting House, New Alexandria, Pennsylvania
- Lovely Election House, Lovely, Pennsylvania

=== Virginia ===
- Voting House building, White Oak, Suffolk County, Virginia (not used since late 1960s)

=== Wisconsin ===
- Old Fourth Ward Voting House, Neenah, Wisconsin

== See also ==
- Praise house
- Gristmill
- Water tower
- Fire lookout tower
- Parish granaries
- Outbuilding
- Slave quarters in the United States
- Nineteenth-century American county courthouse architecture
