= Cranston Voting House No. 12 =

Historic place in Morehead, Kentucky, US

- U.S. National Register of Historic Places
- Location within Kentucky
- Location: Jct. of Clear Fork Rd. and KY 377, Morehead, Kentucky, U.S.
- Coordinates: 38°15′49″N 83°26′10″W
- Area: less than one acre
- Built: 1935
- MPS: Kentucky WPA Stone Voting Houses in Rowan County MPS
- NRHP reference No.: 98000344
- Added to NRHP: April 9, 1998

The Cranston Voting House No. 12 was built in 1935 and located at the junction of Clear Fork Road and Kentucky Route 377 (KY 377) in Rowan County, Kentucky, near Morehead. The building is also known as RW-10. It was listed on the National Register of Historic Places in 1998.

It was constructed by the Works Progress Administration (WPA), and used exclusively as a voting house from 1935 to 1936.

== See also ==
- Brushy Voting House No. 6
- Haldeman Voting House No. 8
- National Register of Historic Places listings in Rowan County, Kentucky
