= Brushy Voting House No. 6 =

- U.S. National Register of Historic Places
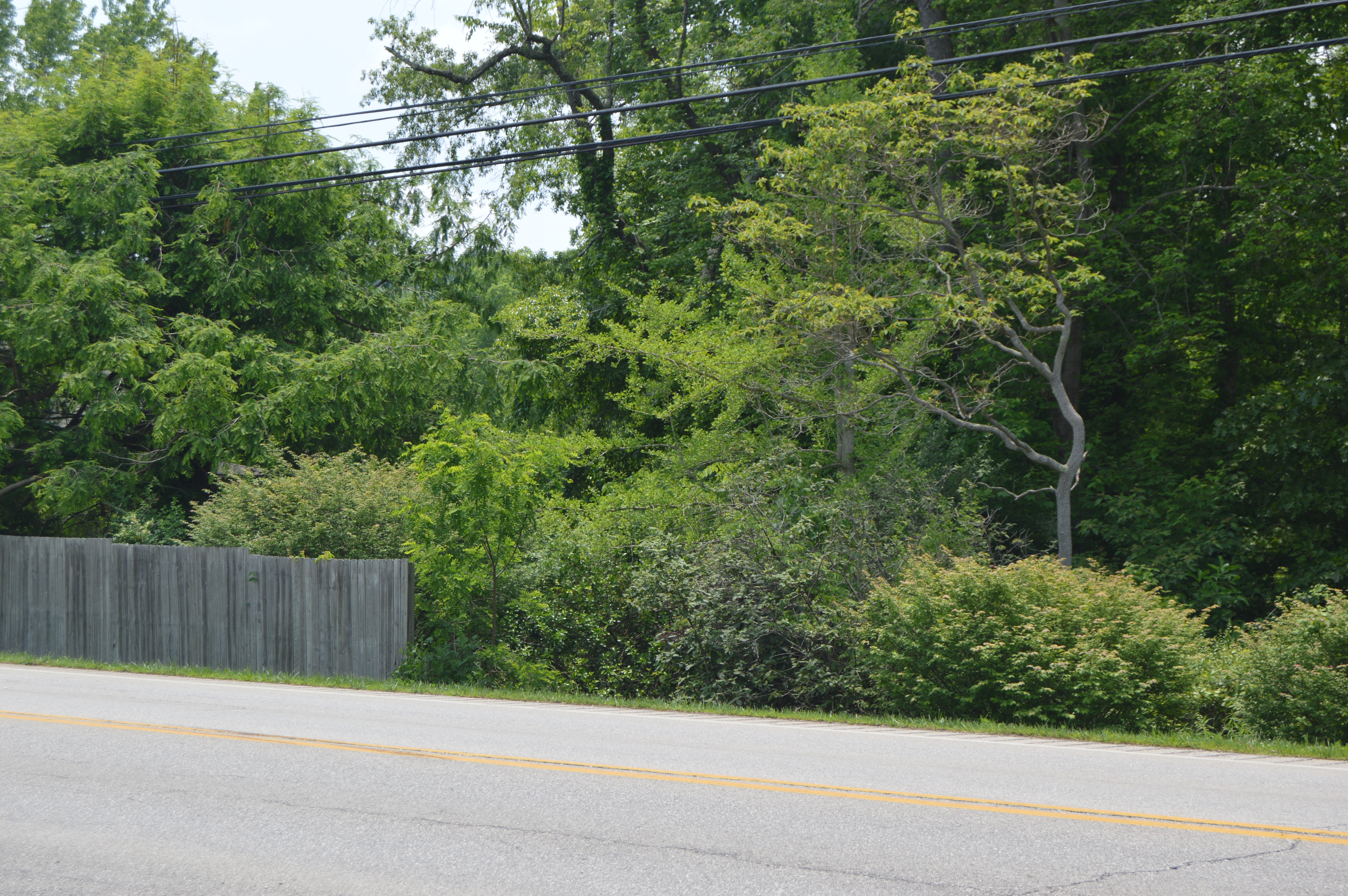
- Former location of building

- Location within Kentucky
- Location: Jct. of KY 32 and Spruce St., Morehead, Kentucky
- Coordinates: 38°13′54″N 83°29′56″W
- Area: less than one acre
- Built: 1935
- MPS: Kentucky WPA Stone Voting Houses in Rowan County MPS
- NRHP reference No.: 98000340
- Added to NRHP: April 9, 1998

Brushy Voting House No. 6 was a voting house located at the junction of KY 32 and Spruce St. near Morehead, Kentucky. It was built in 1935 out of ashlar cut stone, quarried nearby, and beaded mortar.

The voting house seems no longer to exist. (Note: Per photo)

== See also ==
- Cranston Voting House No. 12
- Haldeman Voting House No. 8
- National Register of Historic Places listings in Rowan County, Kentucky
