= Haldeman Voting House No. 8 =

Historic place

- U.S. National Register of Historic Places
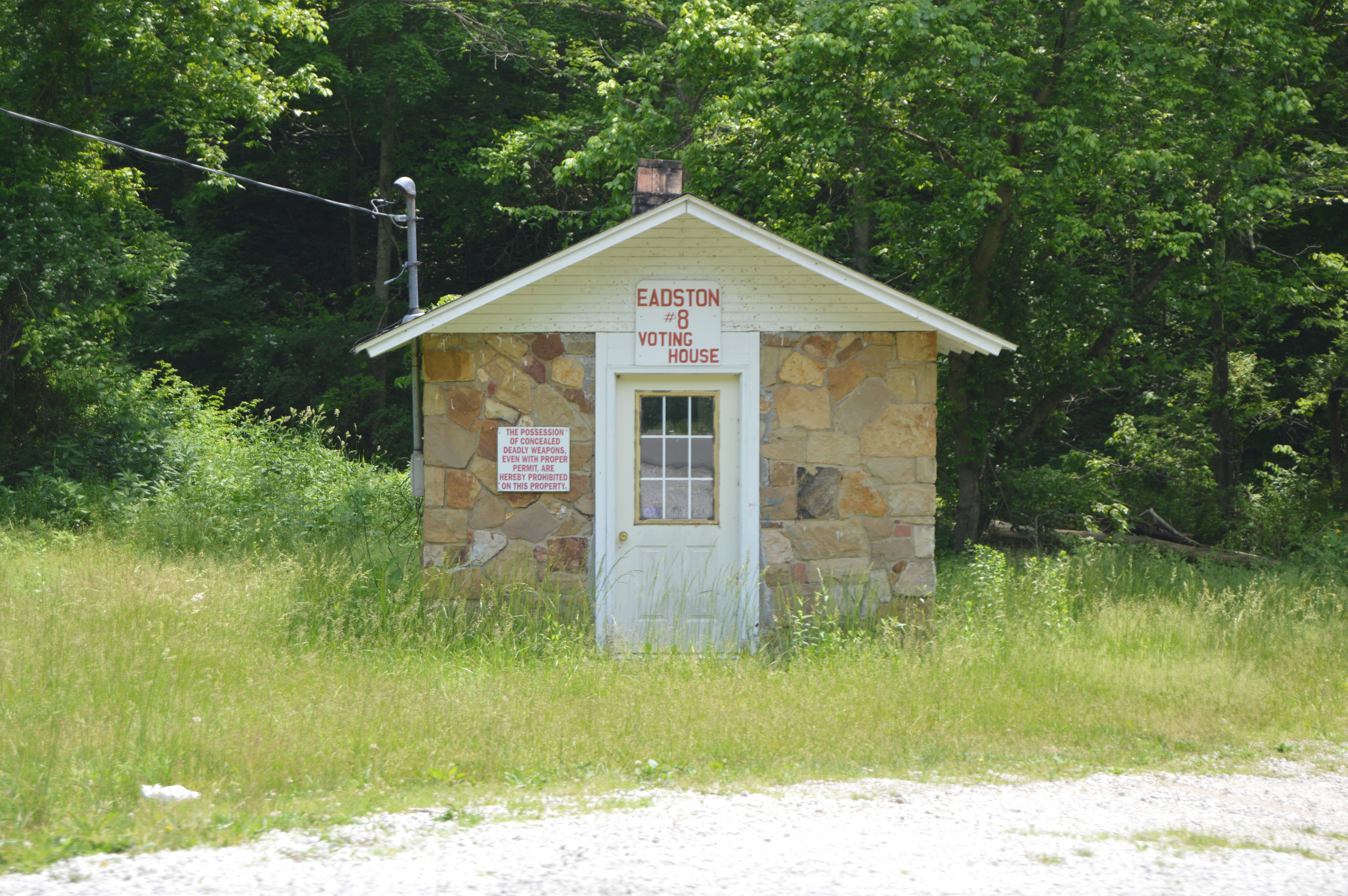

- Location within Kentucky Location within the United States
- Location: KY 174, Morehead, Kentucky
- Coordinates: 38°14′37″N 83°19′24″W
- Area: less than one acre
- Built: 1935
- MPS: Kentucky WPA Stone Voting Houses in Rowan County MPS
- NRHP reference No.: 98000342
- Added to NRHP: April 9, 1998

The Haldeman Voting House No. 8, on Kentucky Route 174 near Morehead, Kentucky, was built in 1935. The voting house was listed on the National Register of Historic Places in 1998.

It is built of fieldstone and flush mortar. It was built by the Works Progress Administration.

== See also ==
- Cranston Voting House No. 12
- Brushy Voting House No. 6
- National Register of Historic Places listings in Rowan County, Kentucky
