= Old Hawg Rifle =

- Eastern Kentucky Colonels Morehead State Eagles
- Sport: Football
- First meeting: 1924; Eastern Kentucky 14, Morehead State 0
- Latest meeting: September 21, 2024; Eastern Kentucky 42, Morehead State 13
- Trophy: Old Hawg Rifle

Statistics
- Total meetings: 74
- All-time series: Eastern Kentucky leads, 54–16–4
- Largest victory: Eastern Kentucky, 67–0 (1925)
- Longest win streak: Eastern Kentucky, 18 (1972–1989)
- Current win streak: Eastern Kentucky, 11 (1991–present)

Locations of Eastern Kentucky and Morehead State

The Old Hawg Rifle is the name of the rivalry trophy between the Eastern Kentucky Colonels and the Morehead State Eagles. The gun is an antique, pre-Revolutionary War muzzleloader that is rumored to have once been used in Kentucky's Rowan County War. The rifle has not been actively used in the rivalry since 1962, though the two teams have continued to play against each other since then. The rifle is currently kept on display in the Morehead State student center. The two teams have met 74 times on the football field, with Eastern Kentucky currently holding a 54–16–4 edge in the all-time series. Eastern Kentucky has won 29 out of the last 30 matchups, including the last 11 consecutive matchups.

== Game results ==
Eastern Kentucky victories	Morehead State victories	Tie games

No.	Date	Location	Winner	Score
1	1924	N/A	Eastern Kentucky	14–0
2	1925	N/A	Eastern Kentucky	67–0
3	1927	Morehead, KY	Eastern Kentucky	12–6
4	October 27, 1928	Richmond, KY	Morehead State	18–0
5	1929	Morehead, KY	Morehead State	13–6
6	1930	Richmond, KY	Eastern Kentucky	13–0
7	November 14, 1931	Morehead, KY	Tie	0–0
8	1932	Richmond, KY	Eastern Kentucky	19–0
9	November 11, 1933	Morehead, KY	Eastern Kentucky	6–0
10	November 2, 1934	Richmond, KY	Eastern Kentucky	7–0
11	November 2, 1935	Morehead, KY	Eastern Kentucky	53–0
12	October 30, 1936	Richmond, KY	Morehead State	18–7
13	October 30, 1937	Morehead, KY	Morehead State	26–0
14	October 29, 1938	Richmond, KY	Tie	0–0
15	October 28, 1939	Morehead, KY	Morehead State	7–6
16	October 26, 1940	Richmond, KY	Eastern Kentucky	27–13
17	November 15, 1941	Morehead, KY	Eastern Kentucky	32–13
18	November 14, 1942	Richmond, KY	Morehead State	20–0
19	November 2, 1946	Morehead, KY	Morehead State	12–6
20	November 1, 1947	Richmond, KY	Eastern Kentucky	34–7
21	October 30, 1948	Morehead, KY	Eastern Kentucky	7–0
22	October 29, 1949	Richmond, KY	Morehead State	27–26
23	October 28, 1950	Morehead, KY	Eastern Kentucky	14–7
24	October 27, 1951	Richmond, KY	Eastern Kentucky	6–0
25	October 25, 1952	Morehead, KY	Tie	20–20
26	October 23, 1953	Richmond, KY	Eastern Kentucky	25–7
27	October 23, 1954	Morehead, KY	Eastern Kentucky	12–8
28	October 21, 1955	Richmond, KY	Eastern Kentucky	35–13
29	November 10, 1956	Richmond, KY	Eastern Kentucky	19–0
30	November 16, 1957	Morehead, KY	Eastern Kentucky	40–3
31	November 15, 1958	Richmond, KY	Eastern Kentucky	24–6
32	November 14, 1959	Morehead, KY	Eastern Kentucky	12–7
33	November 12, 1960	Richmond, KY	Morehead State	21–9
34	November 11, 1961	Morehead, KY	Eastern Kentucky	13–0
35	November 10, 1962	Richmond, KY	Morehead State	20–12
36	November 16, 1963	Morehead, KY	Morehead State	6–0
37	November 14, 1964	Richmond, KY	Eastern Kentucky	10–7
38	November 13, 1965	Morehead, KY	Eastern Kentucky	38–20

No.	Date	Location	Winner	Score
39	November 12, 1966	Richmond, KY	Morehead State	21–19
40	November 18, 1967	Morehead, KY	Tie	7–7
41	November 23, 1968	Richmond, KY	Eastern Kentucky	35–7
42	November 22, 1969	Morehead, KY	Morehead State	23–11
43	November 21, 1970	Richmond, KY	Morehead State	16–13
44	November 20, 1971	Morehead, KY	Morehead State	10–7
45	November 18, 1972	Richmond, KY	Eastern Kentucky	28–6
46	November 17, 1973	Morehead, KY	Eastern Kentucky	37–25
47	November 23, 1974	Richmond, KY	Eastern Kentucky	21–14
48	November 22, 1975	Morehead, KY	Eastern Kentucky	17–9
49	November 20, 1976	Richmond, KY	Eastern Kentucky	31–12
50	November 19, 1977	Morehead, KY	Eastern Kentucky	42–13
51	November 18, 1978	Richmond, KY	Eastern Kentucky	30–0
52	November 17, 1979	Morehead, KY	Eastern Kentucky	34–7
53	November 22, 1980	Richmond, KY	Eastern Kentucky	18–14
54	November 21, 1981	Morehead, KY	Eastern Kentucky	21–17
55	November 20, 1982	Richmond, KY	Eastern Kentucky	20–3
56	November 12, 1983	Morehead, KY	Eastern Kentucky	56–0
57	November 10, 1984	Richmond, KY	Eastern Kentucky	48–38
58	November 16, 1985	Morehead, KY	Eastern Kentucky	26–0
59	November 22, 1986	Richmond, KY	Eastern Kentucky	23–6
60	November 21, 1987	Morehead, KY	Eastern Kentucky	23–0
61	November 19, 1988	Richmond, KY	Eastern Kentucky	39–17
62	November 18, 1989	Morehead, KY	Eastern Kentucky	38–31
63	November 17, 1990	Richmond, KY	Morehead State	27–17
64	November 23, 1991	Richmond, KY	Eastern Kentucky	41–10
65	November 21, 1992	Morehead, KY	Eastern Kentucky	37–9
66	November 20, 1993	Morehead, KY	Eastern Kentucky	44–7
67	November 19, 1994	Richmond, KY	Eastern Kentucky	54–7
68	November 18, 1995	Richmond, KY	Eastern Kentucky	41–10
69	September 13, 2008	Richmond, KY	Eastern Kentucky	16–8
70	September 8, 2012	Richmond, KY	Eastern Kentucky	24–17
71	September 21, 2013	Morehead, KY	Eastern Kentucky	56–24
72	September 13, 2014	Richmond, KY	Eastern Kentucky	55–13
73	August 30, 2018	Richmond, KY	Eastern Kentucky	49–23
74	September 21, 2024	Richmond, KY	Eastern Kentucky	42–13
Series: Eastern Kentucky leads 54–16–4

== See also ==
- List of NCAA college football rivalry games
