= Maple Leaf Farm Potato House =

- U.S. National Register of Historic Places
- Location within Maryland Location within the United States
- Location: 26632 Porter Mill Road, Hebron, Maryland
- Coordinates: 38°26′14″N 75°41′24″W
- Area: less than one acre
- Built: 1920
- NRHP reference No.: 98000544
- Added to NRHP: June 1, 1998

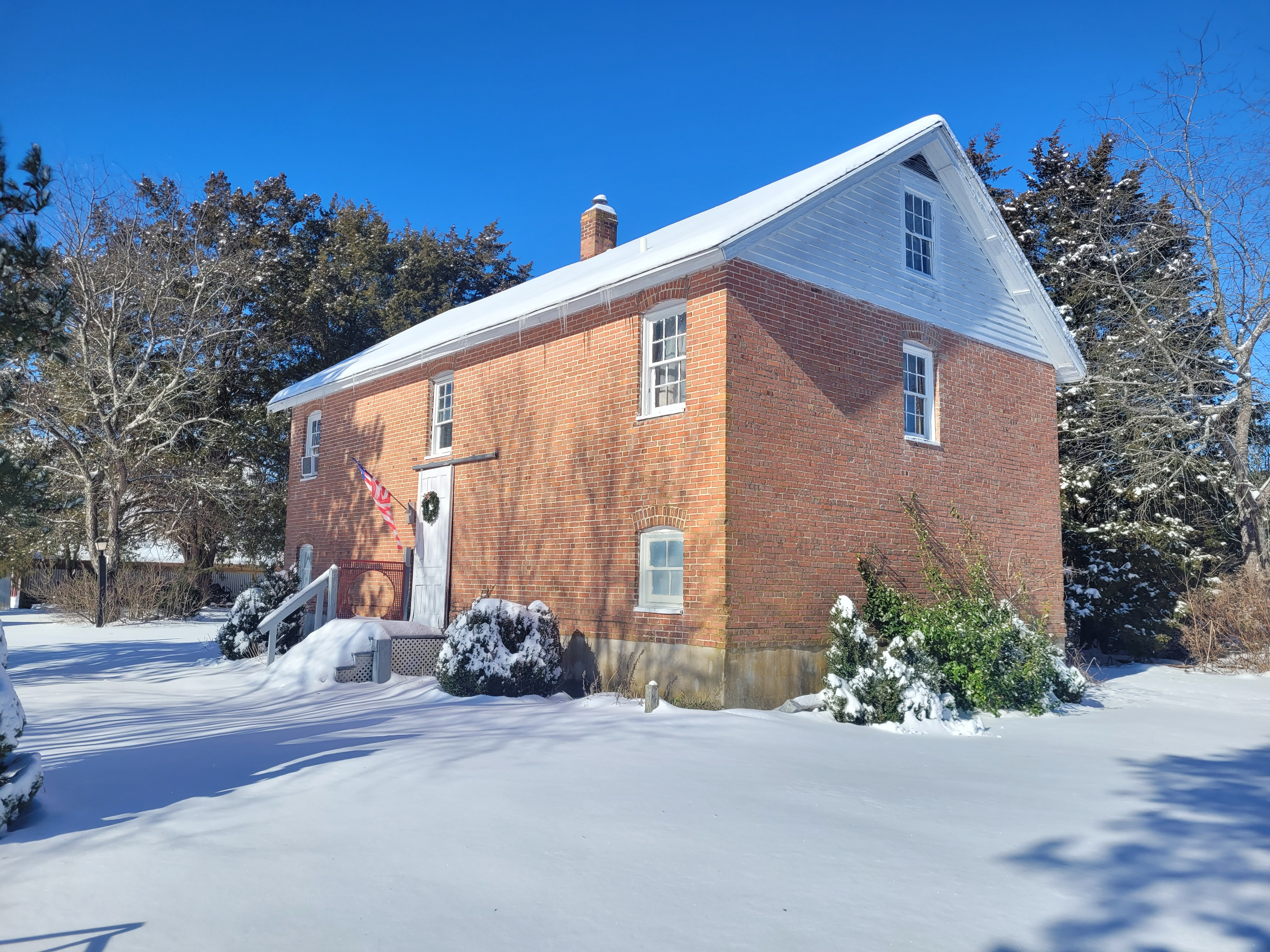
Maple Leaf Potato House at Western Fields

The Maple Leaf Farm Potato House is a historic agricultural storage building located on the property of Western Fields at Hebron, Wicomico County, Maryland. It was originally located on the north side of U.S. Route 50, southeast of the intersection with White Lowe Road, and moved to its present site within Western Fields in July 1997. It is a common bond brick structure measuring 40 feet by 24 feet, built between 1920 and 1928, and used for the storage of sweet potatoes.

It was listed on the National Register of Historic Places in 1998.
