= Zilpo Road =

Scenic byway in Kentucky

Zilpo Road National Forest Scenic Byway

Route information
- Maintained by KYTC

Location
- Country: United States
- State: Kentucky

Highway system
- Scenic Byways; National; National Forest; BLM; NPS; Kentucky State Highway System; Interstate; US; State; Parkways

Zilpo Road is a National Forest Scenic Byway in the forested hills of eastern Kentucky in the United States. The nine-mile (14 km) byway starts south of Salt Lick and can be accessed by Kentucky Route 211 (KY 2112). The byway travels through the Daniel Boone National Forest and ends on the western shore of Cave Run Lake at the Zilpo Recreation Area. It follows FSR 918, which is a two-lane paved road suitable for all motor vehicles and is usually open throughout the year.

Cave Run Lake is one of the main attractions of this byway. It is a 7,390-acre (2,990 ha) lake constructed on the Licking River by the Army Corps of Engineers. The Zilpo Recreation Area is a 355-acre (144 ha) park offering wooded campsites and a variety of facilities. On the other side of the lake is the 700-acre (280 ha) Twin Knobs Recreation Area. which has additional campsites.
