= St. Giles (Hebron, Maryland) =

Historic house in Maryland, United States

- U.S. National Register of Historic Places
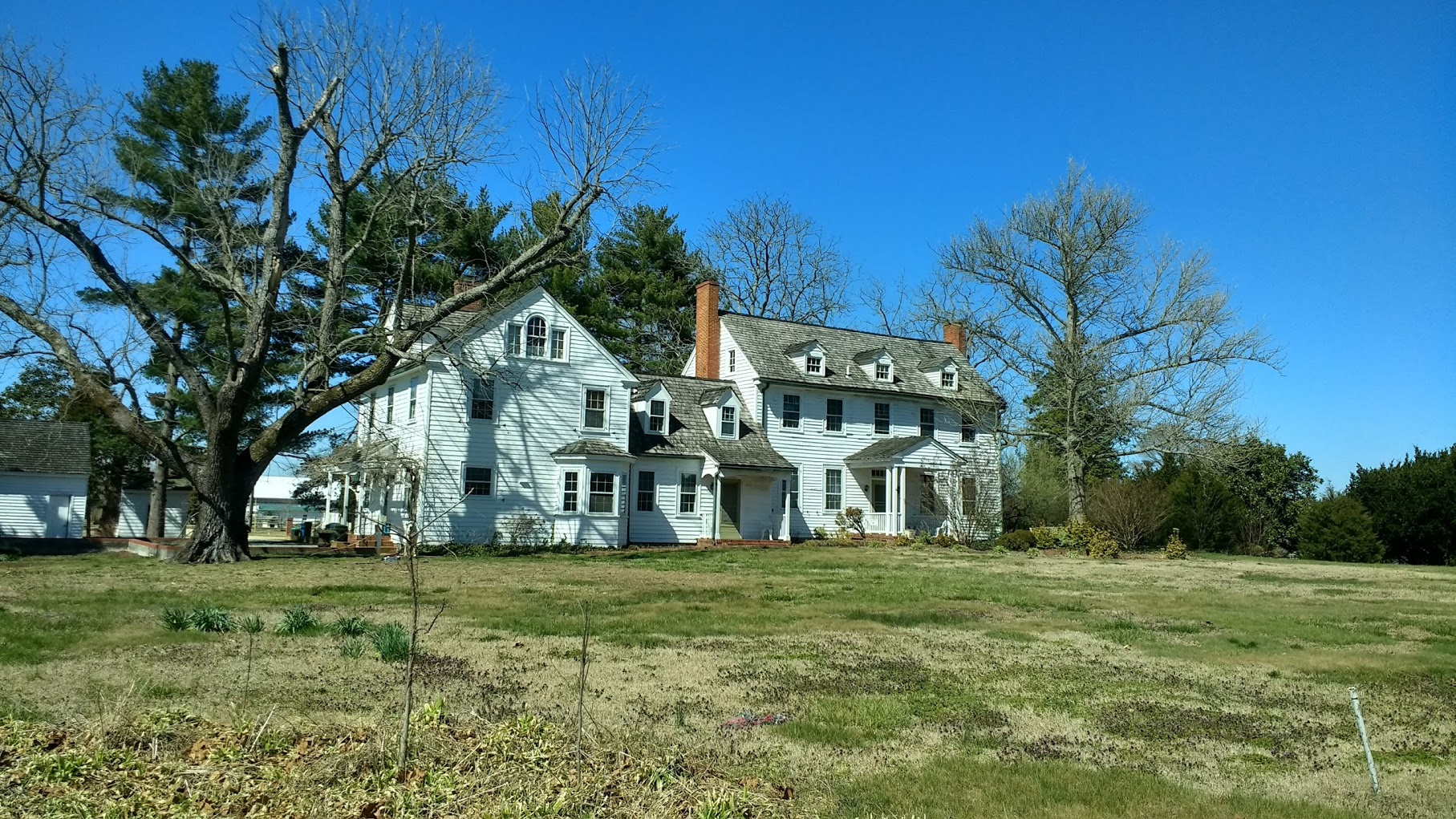

- Location within Maryland Location within the United States
- Location: 7934 Quantico Road (MD 347), Hebron, Maryland
- Coordinates: 38°24′50″N 75°41′57″W
- Area: 80 acres (32 ha)
- Architectural style: Federal
- NRHP reference No.: 82001602
- Added to NRHP: December 20, 1982

St. Giles is a historic home located at Hebron, Wicomico County, Maryland, United States. It is a 2 1/2-story frame Federal period farmhouse, with a 20th-century hyphen and wing. Also on the property are several outbuildings, including a well house, wood house, tenant house, barn, garage, and pool house. The landscaped grounds include a garden which is thought to retain its original early-19th-century layout.

St. Giles was listed on the National Register of Historic Places in 1982.
