= Western Fields =

Historic house in Maryland, United States

- U.S. National Register of Historic Places
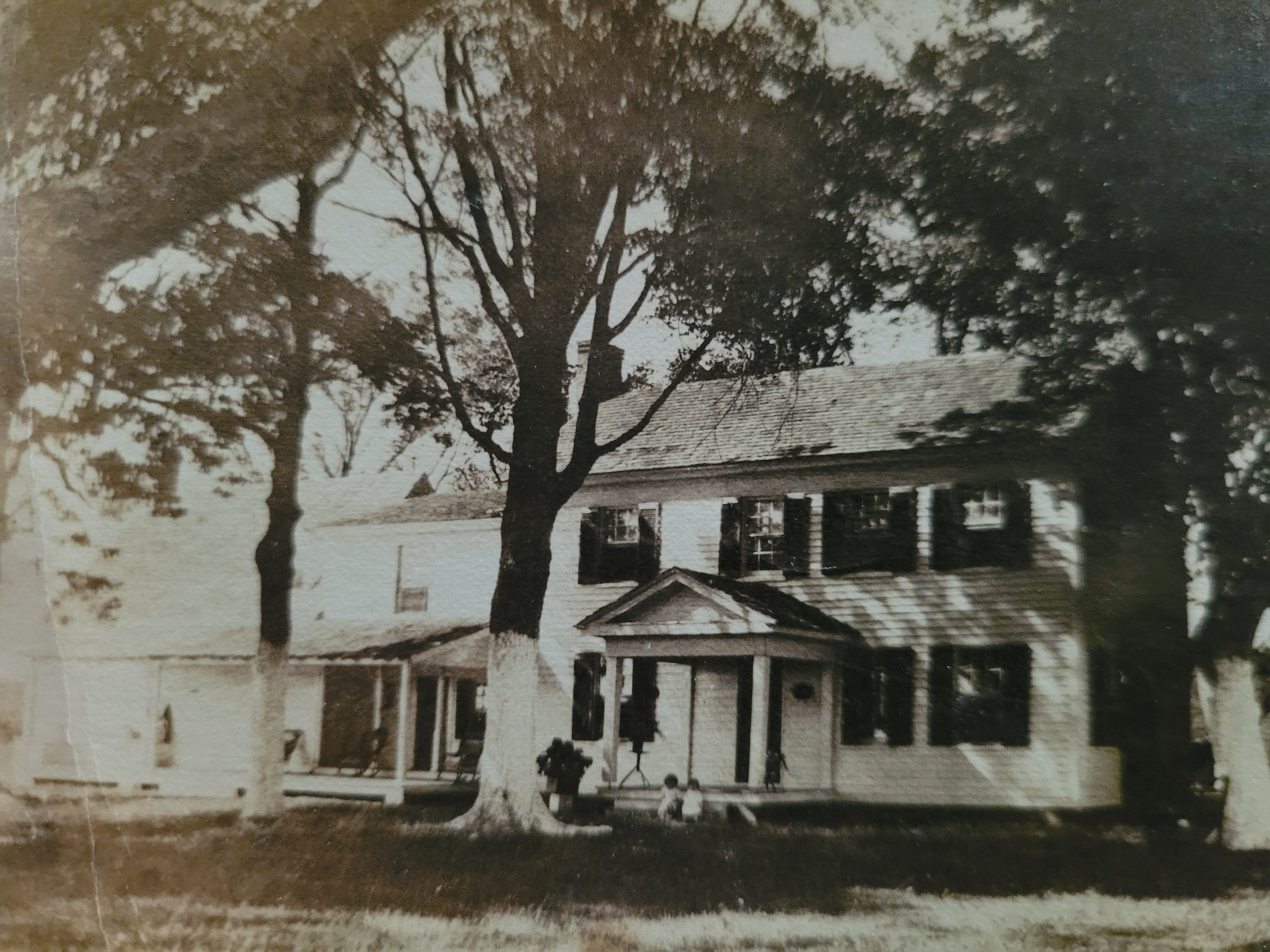
- Western Fields in 1920s

- Location within Maryland Location within the United States
- Location: Porter Mill Road (MD 437), Hebron, Maryland
- Coordinates: 38.4363°N 75.6893°W
- Area: 19.6 acres (7.9 ha)
- Built: c. 1790
- Architectural style: Greek Revival
- NRHP reference No.: 87000641
- Added to NRHP: June 12, 1987

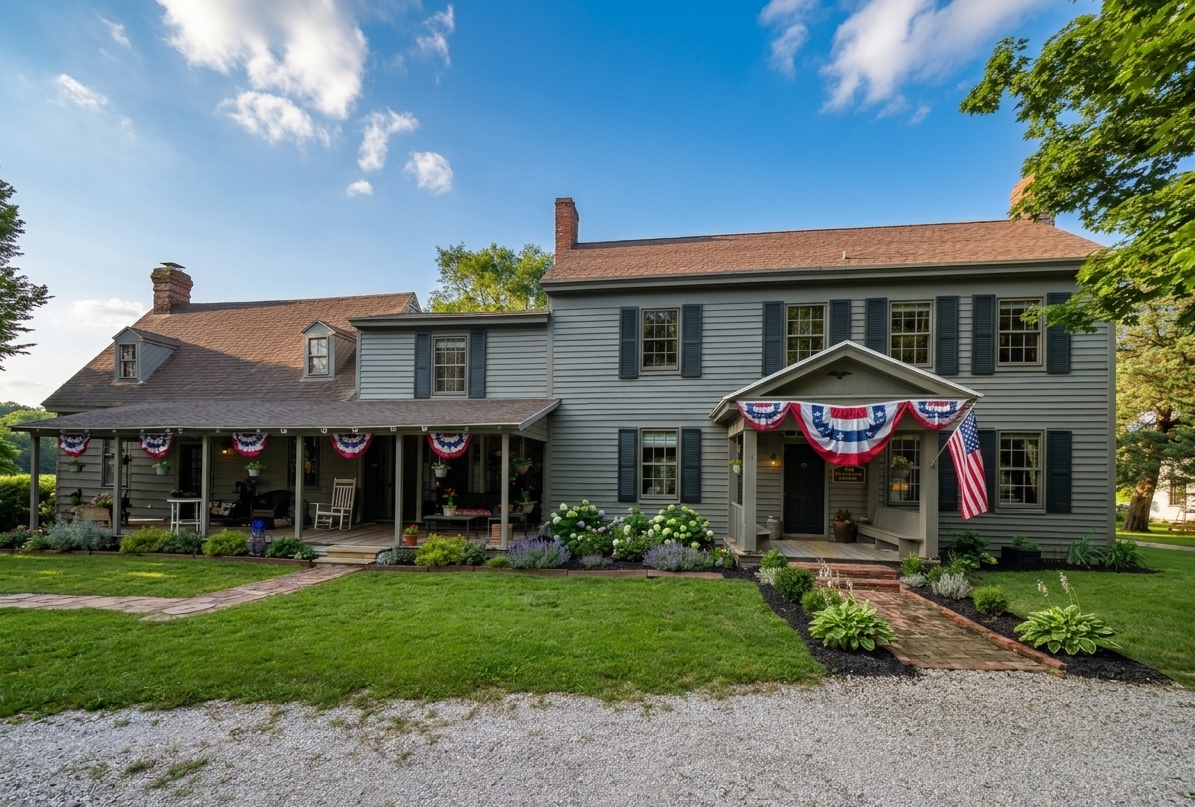

Western Fields is a historic home located at Hebron, Wicomico County, Maryland, United States. It is a Greek Revival-style three-part frame "telescope" dwelling started about 1790 and expanded in the mid-19th century. The main block was constructed in 1845. The property also includes an early-20th century frame tenant house and corn crib, and a small family cemetery. In 1997, the Maple Leaf Farm Potato House was moved to Western Fields. In 2015, the Quantico Election House was moved to Western Fields. From 1825 through 1985, the property was owned by the Phillips family, prominent Wicomico County planters during the 19th and 20th centuries.

Western Fields was listed on the National Register of Historic Places in 1987.
