= Spring Hill Church =

Historic church in Maryland, United States

- U.S. National Register of Historic Places
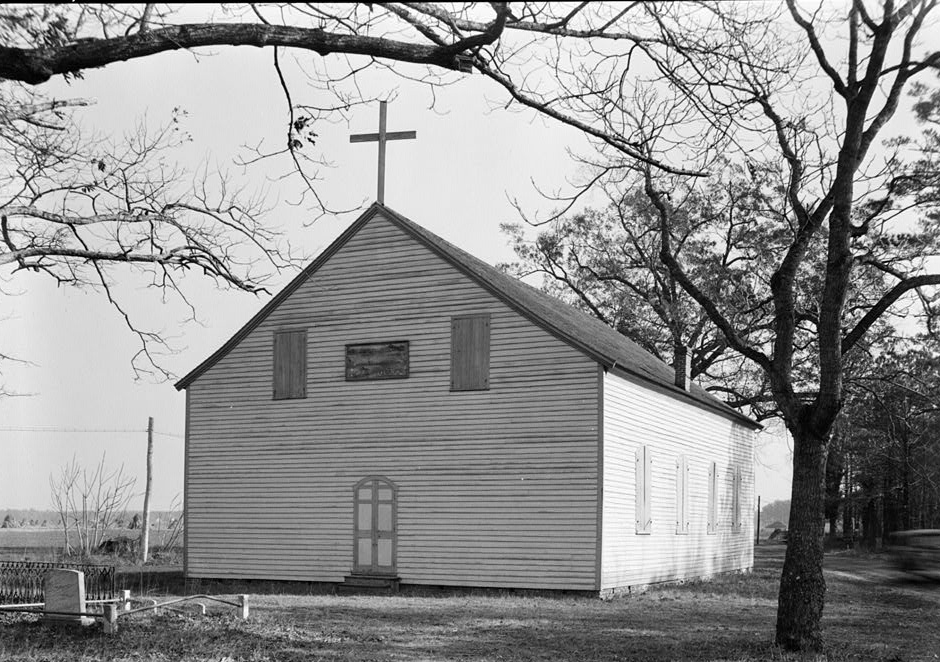

- Location within Maryland Location within the United States
- Location: 8700 Memory Gardens Lane, near Hebron, Maryland
- Coordinates: 38°25′46″N 75°40′25″W
- Area: 2 acres (0.81 ha)
- Built: 1773
- NRHP reference No.: 76001021
- Added to NRHP: October 22, 1976

Spring Hill Church, also known as Old Spring Hill and St. Paul's Episcopal Church, was a historic Episcopal church located at Hebron, Wicomico County, Maryland. It was located eight miles north on the Wicomico River from Green Hill Church, which it strongly resembled. The white frame structure, two bays wide and four deep and set on a Flemish bond brick foundation, was constructed as St. Paul's Episcopal Church in 1773. The interior featured a barrel-vault ceiling. It was listed on the National Register of Historic Places in 1976.

Fire destroyed the historic wooden church on July 22, 2014, months after it celebrated its 240th anniversary. Nearly 100 firefighters from numerous fire departments, including Wicomico County as well as Sussex County, Delaware responded to the fire, which investigators said quickly escalated to three alarms.
