= Cave Run Lake =

Man-made lake in Kentucky, United States

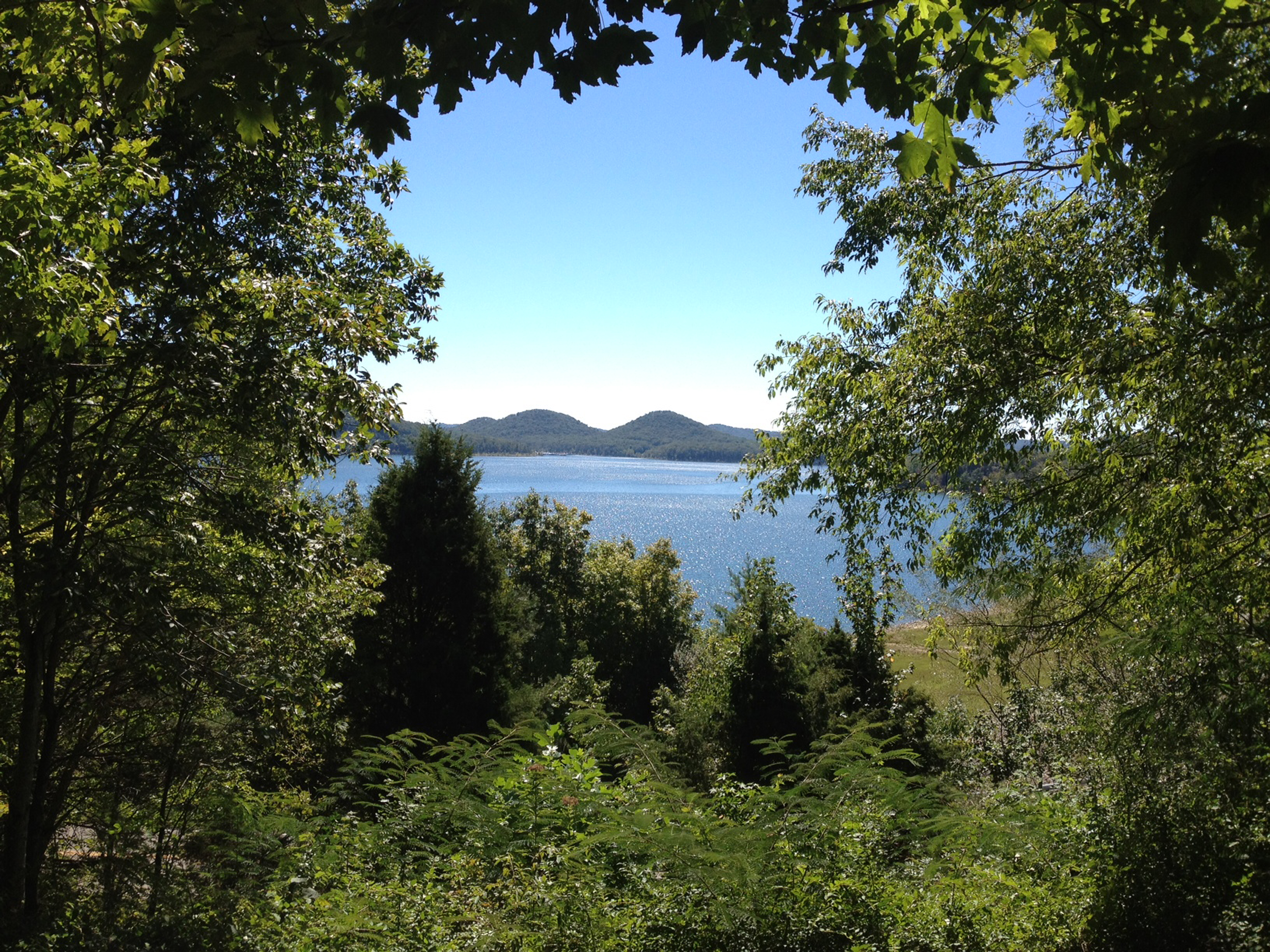

- Location within Kentucky
- Location: Kentucky
- Coordinates: 38°04′53″N 83°29′29″W
- Type: reservoir
- Primary inflows: Licking River
- Basin countries: United States
- Surface area: 8,270 acres (33 km^{2})
- Water volume: Maximum: 614,100 acre⋅ft (0.7575 km^{3})
- Surface elevation: 720 ft (220 m)

Cave Run Lake, located south of Morehead, Kentucky, USA along Kentucky Route 801, is an 8,270-acre (33 km^{2}) reservoir built by the U.S. Army Corps of Engineers. The 148 feet (45 m), half-mile (800 m) dam (and outlet works) construction began in 1965 and was completed in 1973. Cave Run Lake is in the northern part of the Daniel Boone National Forest. Cave Run Lake provides flood protection to the lower Licking River valley, supplies water to the area's communities, improves the Licking River's water flow conditions, and offers a habitat for various species of fish and wildlife. It is in Rowan, Morgan, Menifee, and Bath counties.

== Recreation ==
The lake also provides various other recreational activities (swimming, boating & sailing, canoe and kayak, jet skiing, camping, hiking, well known for Mountain Bike trails, etc.)

There are two marinas that serve the lake, Scott's Creek Marina and Long Bow Marina.

Zilpo Road, a scenic byway, is one road which provides access to the Bath County side of Cave Run Lake and is usually accessible throughout the year. The byway provides access to pioneer weapons hunting areas, a campground, and numerous hiking trails. Cave Run also has designated beaches for recreational use. A small fee will allow you to enter the beaches and partake in swimming, hiking, and barbequing.

== Tourism ==
Forested ridges of the Daniel Boone National Forest above Cave Run Lake, Kentucky, 2026

Cave Run Lake offers a wide variety of fishing opportunities. Cave Run is home to a variety of aquatic species such as crappie, largemouth bass, smallmouth bass, musky, and various pan fish. Fishing tournaments are also held on the lake. Boat charters with a professional guide can be purchased on the lake. The Daniel Boone National Forest surrounding Cave Run holds many opportunities. Free campsites can be found in the state park and is first-come, first-served. The forest contains hiking trails and hunting is permitted during the regular season. Horseback riding is allowed on the trails.

Visitors can visit Cave Run's sand beaches for a small entry fee. These beaches do not have a lifeguard on duty. The state park offers showers at the beach sites as well as restrooms. Designated barbeque sites can be found along the shoreline. Throughout certain spots of the land surrounding the lake, ATV's and other off-road vehicles are allowed.

Lodging is readily available around the lake. There are plenty of rental properties such as cabins and lake houses on the land. Many of the cabins available are just walking distance from the lake. The surrounding towns are filled with small shops and restaurants to visit. Cave Run has various marinas that offer boat storage and boat rentals. Skiing and tubing on the water is allowed.
