= Hebron, Maryland =

- Town
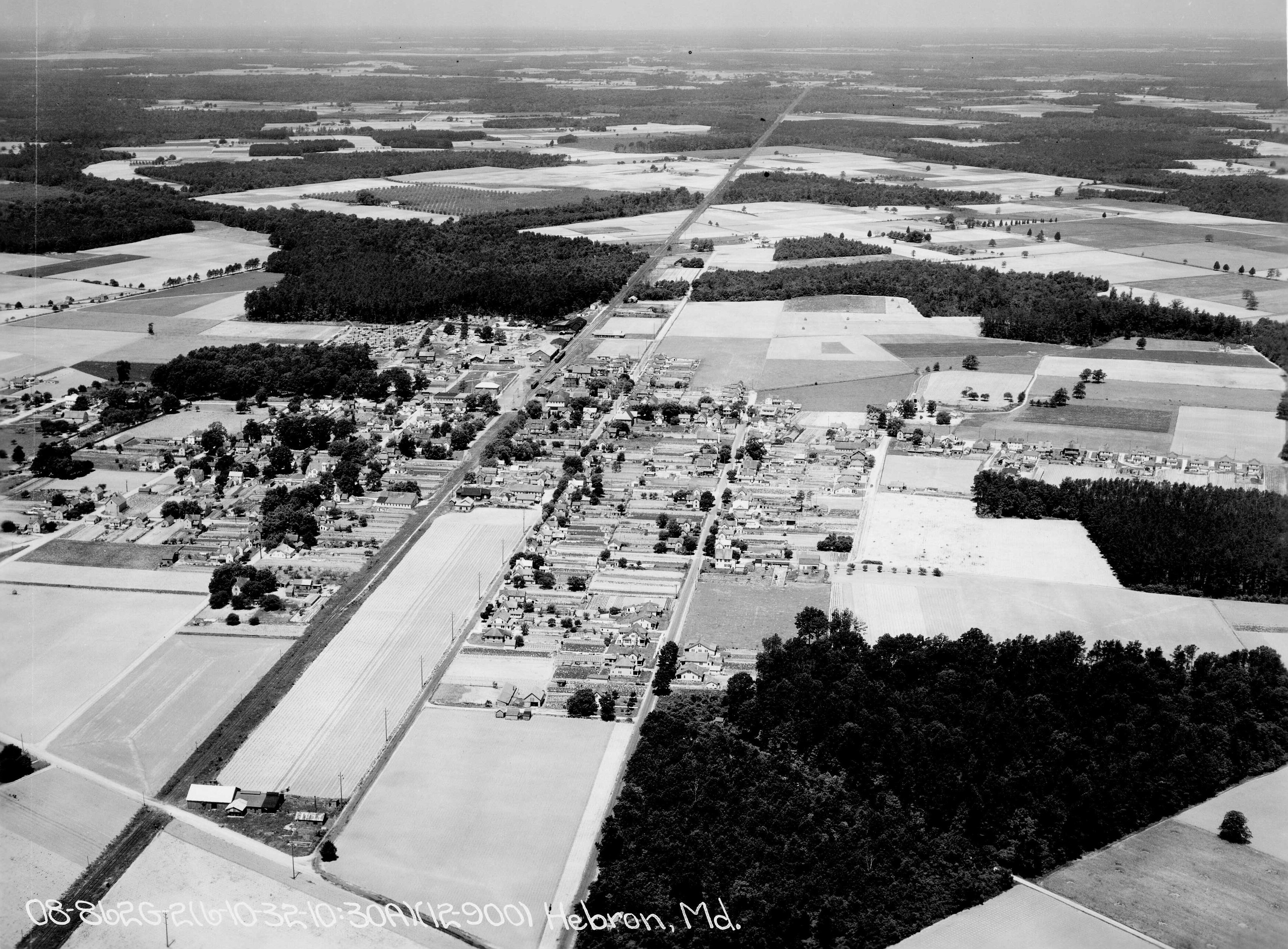
- Hebron, July 1932

- Seal

- Location of Hebron, Maryland
- Coordinates: 38°25′5″N 75°41′16″W
- Country: United States
- State: Maryland
- County: Wicomico
- Incorporated: 1931

Area
  - Total: 1.31 sq mi (3.40 km^{2})
  - Land: 1.31 sq mi (3.40 km^{2})
  - Water: 0 sq mi (0.00 km^{2})
- Elevation: 39 ft (12 m)

Population (2020)
  - Total: 1,113
  - Density: 848.0/sq mi (327.43/km^{2})
- Demonym: Hebronite
- Time zone: UTC-5 (Eastern (EST))
  - Summer (DST): UTC-4 (EDT)
- ZIP code: 21830
- Area codes: 410, 443
- FIPS code: 24-37875
- GNIS feature ID: 0584921
- Website: www.hebronmd.com

Hebron is a town in Wicomico County, Maryland, United States. The population was 1,113 at the 2020 census. It is included in the Salisbury, Maryland-Delaware Metropolitan Statistical Area. It is the hometown of pro-wrestler Mark Hildreth and politician Scott Taylor.

== History ==
The Maple Leaf Farm Potato House, Spring Hill Church, St. Giles, and Western Fields are listed on the National Register of Historic Places.

Hebron Train Depot In 1890, the Baltimore, Chesapeake and Atlantic Railroad was extended westward from Salisbury. About six miles from that city, the line crossed a country road where there was a store and a Colonial dwelling. All around were farms and woodland. Here the builders of the railroad designated a shipping point and named it Hebron (The community was named for the biblical city). Five years later, a lumber manufacturing plant was located there, and a hamlet began to develop. While earlier towns sprang up on rivers, Hebron came about because of the railroad and to the immense effect that the railroad had on this area was added the automobile and improved farm machinery. By the 1920s Hebron was a hub for farming as well as manufacturing with major markets being easily and quickly accessible. In 1927 there were five shirt factories, a flour mill, a canning operation, a lumber mill, and a new high school under construction. There were large poultry and dairy farms joining the profitable farming of peaches, apples, strawberries, sweet potatoes, cucumbers, tomatoes, cantaloupes, and watermelons. The most prominent of these were the farms of B. Frank Adkins known as Neighbor's Wonder Farm, renowned for its herd of Guernsey cattle, the Oakdale Poultry Farm owned by J.T. Insley, and the farms of James A. Phillips and James Gordy. Notable citizens responsible for the manufacturing aspect of the town were Walter B. Miller and G.A. Bounds, the latter which owned both a lumber mill and canning plant and whose house still stands on Main Street today.

== Geography ==
Hebron is located at 38°25′5″N 75°41′16″W (38.418091, -75.687669). According to the United States Census Bureau, the town has a total area of 1.28 square miles (3.32 km^{2}), all land.

== Transportation ==
Spring Hill Landing Strip is located in Hebron.

== Education ==
Westside Intermediate School is located in Hebron, Maryland.

== Demographics ==
Historical population
Census	Pop.	Note	%±
1920	651		—
1930	805		23.7%
1940	804		−0.1%
1950	723		−10.1%
1960	754		4.3%
1970	705		−6.5%
1980	714		1.3%
1990	665		−6.9%
2000	807		21.4%
2010	1,084		34.3%
2020	1,113		2.7%
U.S. Decennial Census

=== 2010 census ===
As of the census of 2010, there were 1,084 people, 419 households, and 285 families living in the town. The population density was 846.9 inhabitants per square mile (327.0/km^{2}). There were 457 housing units at an average density of 357.0 per square mile (137.8/km^{2}). The racial makeup of the town was 83.8% White, 13.5% African American, 0.3% Native American, 0.8% Asian, 0.3% from other races, and 1.4% from two or more races. Hispanic or Latino of any race were 2.0% of the population.

There were 419 households, of which 38.9% had children under the age of 18 living with them, 47.0% were married couples living together, 13.8% had a female householder with no husband present, 7.2% had a male householder with no wife present, and 32.0% were non-families. 25.8% of all households were made up of individuals, and 12.7% had someone living alone who was 65 years of age or older. The average household size was 2.59 and the average family size was 3.11.

The median age in the town was 34.8 years. 26.3% of residents were under the age of 18; 10.1% were between the ages of 18 and 24; 28% were from 25 to 44; 23.4% were from 45 to 64; and 12.2% were 65 years of age or older. The gender makeup of the town was 47.5% male and 52.5% female.

=== 2000 census ===
As of the census of 2000, there were 807 people, 299 households, and 229 families living in the town. The population density was 1,965.9 inhabitants per square mile (759.0/km^{2}). There were 325 housing units at an average density of 791.7 per square mile (305.7/km^{2}). The racial makeup of the town was 86.12% White, 11.65% African American, 0.12% Native American, 0.50% Asian, 0.62% from other races, and 0.99% from two or more races. Hispanic or Latino of any race were 0.62% of the population.

There were 299 households, out of which 40.8% had children under the age of 18 living with them, 55.9% were married couples living together, 16.4% had a female householder with no husband present, and 23.1% were non-families. 18.7% of all households were made up of individuals, and 7.4% had someone living alone who was 65 years of age or older. The average household size was 2.70 and the average family size was 3.01.

In the town, the population was spread out, with 30.5% under the age of 18, 8.4% from 18 to 24, 30.4% from 25 to 44, 20.1% from 45 to 64, and 10.7% who were 65 years of age or older. The median age was 32 years. For every 100 females, there were 95.4 males. For every 100 females age 18 and over, there were 85.1 males.

The median income for a household in the town was $36,750, and the median income for a family was $40,694. Males had a median income of $30,500 versus $18,068 for females. The per capita income for the town was $14,400. About 10.9% of families and 13.4% of the population were below the poverty line, including 22.5% of those under age 18 and 11.8% of those age 65 or over.
