= Rowan County War =

Feud that took place between 1884 and 1887

The Rowan County War (1884–1887), which occurred in Rowan County, Kentucky, centered on Morehead, was a feud that took place between the Martin-Tolliver clans and their supporters. In total, 20 people died and 16 were wounded.

== Background ==
The war has its roots in the Underwood-Holbrook feud (1877–1879), which resulted in all male Underwoods dying in the conflict, which claimed 20 lives. John Martin, a lesser member of the Underwoods, had worked as a clerk for Rowan County and owned a store in Morehead. In 1877, his gambling caused him to lose his store, and charges of falsifying county records cost him his clerk job in an election in 1878. Then, he rented land from George Underwood, which led him to support the Underwoods in the feud.

After the feud, Martin began illegal distillery operations. Being a Republican, he became a political rival of Floyd Tolliver, a Democrat, also formerly of the Underwood faction. On election day in August 1884, after a misunderstanding, Tolliver wounded Martin while killing Solomon Bradley, a friend of Martin. Just before the matter was to be settled in court in December 1884, Tolliver and Martin met each other while drinking, and Martin fired his pistol while it was still in his coat pocket, which killed Tolliver. Tolliver's last words, addressed to some friends, were:

Remember what you swore to do; you said you would kill him; Keep your word.

== War ==
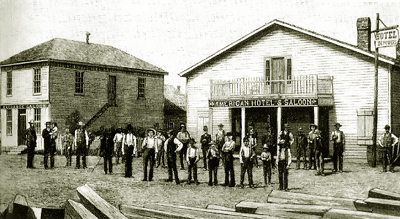
D.B. Logan's forces outside American Hotel

Martin was promptly jailed and then taken to the Clark County jail in Winchester, Kentucky out of fears for his safety. That led Tolliver's brother, Craig Tolliver, to kill two cousins of D.B. Logan, an ally of Martin. Tolliver supporters soon gained control over the county.

Martin was eventually killed after supporters of Tolliver forged a request to transfer Martin back to Morehead and shot him after boarding the train. Martin's wife was in another car of the same train and felt dread after hearing shots fired. Rushing to the scene, she saw her husband dying. Martin lived long enough to travel back to Morehead, where he walked to the Powers Hotel, where he died the next day. Quickly, sides were chosen, with Democratic families supporting Craig Tolliver and Republican families supporting Martin's family.

Craig Tolliver became the town marshal of Morehead and assumed control of Morehead by intimidation. The sheriff of Rowan County, Cook Humphrey, a Republican, sided with Martin's father, Dr. Ben Martin. By July 1885, nine out of ten men in the county had taken one side or the other in the new conflict.

Feud violence continued for three years and concluded in the summer of 1887, when a faction led by Hiram and Logan Pigman surrounded and shot Craig Tolliver. Three others died in a final two-hour shootout involving sixty men.

== Aftermath ==
Three times, the state militia was called to quell the violence, including the noted Louisville Legion. At one point, a state report by General Sam Hill recommended to the governor of Kentucky for Rowan County to be dissolved because of the violence. After a legislative investigation by the Kentucky State Assembly concluded, the townfolk were mortified of their reputation throughout the state. They acted by creating the Morehead Normal School in 1887.

Years later, the school closed in the spring of 1922, when the Kentucky General Assembly established Morehead State University. The incidents of this conflict are chronicled in a ballad titled, alternately, "The Rowan County Crew" and "The Rowan County Feud."

A reconciliation between the Martin and Tolliver families occurred with the marriage of Grace Martin (daughter of Gils Martin) and Frank Tolliver (brother of Craig Tolliver) in 1889.

== Sources ==
- "Riotous Rowan. A Full Report of the Deplorable State of Affairs". The Courier-Journal. April 4, 1885. p. 2 – via newspapers.com.
  - Continued: "Riotous Rowan. A Full Report of the Deplorable State of Affairs. (Part 2)". The Courier-Journal. April 4, 1885. p. 3 – via newspapers.com.
