= Downtown Morehead Historic District =

- U.S. National Register of Historic Places
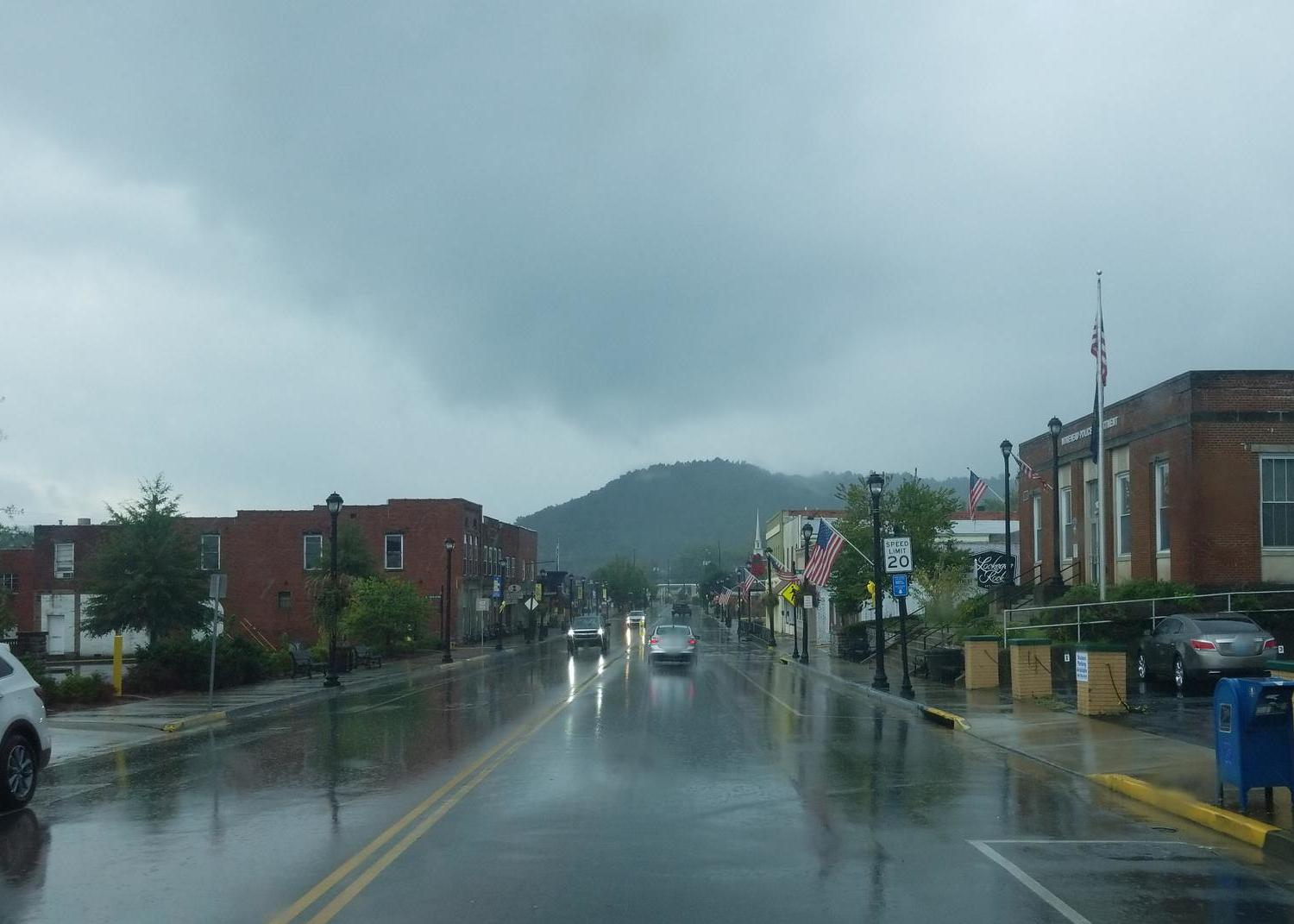
- Main Street, including Morehead Police Department at right, in 2018

- Location within Kentucky Location within the United States
- Location: Roughly bounded by South Hargis Ave., West 1st, East 1st, Bridge, East Main, and East 2nd Sts., North Wilson Ave., and West Main St., Morehead, Kentucky
- Coordinates: 38.1805°N 83.4361°W
- Area: 30.37 acres (12.29 ha)
- NRHP reference No.: 100006264
- Added to NRHP: May 11, 2022

The Downtown Morehead Historic District, in Morehead in Rowan County, Kentucky, is a 30.37 acres (12.29 ha) historic district which was listed on the National Register of Historic Places in 2022.

Its area is the original downtown business district area, as of 1881. It is roughly bounded by South Hargis Ave., West 1st, East 1st, Bridge, East Main, and East 2nd Sts., North Wilson Ave., and West Main St. and includes 55 contributing buildings, 17 non-contributing buildings and 23 non-contributing sites.

The District includes:

- Morehead Police Department (1938), 105 E. Main St., in Works Progress Administration-era building which was U.S. Post Office until 1987, and later was City Hall
- Morehead Chesapeake & Ohio Railway Freight Depot (1904), already separately NRHP-listed in 2016
- Rowan County Courthouse (1899), already separately NRHP-listed
- Moonlight School, 182 East 1st St., a one room schoolhouse building now on the campus of Morehead State, representing how in 1911 educator Cora Wilson Stewart, superindentend of Rowan County schools, began the Midnight Schools, the "forerunner of adult education in the United States and the world." The structure, one site in the program, was moved to this location in 1972 from Big Brushy (a locality about eight miles north).
- - First Christian Church (1925), 227 E. Main St., church which replaced the Union Church that had been built by Col. John Hargis, founder of Morehead. Col. Hargis's funeral was the first in the new building.
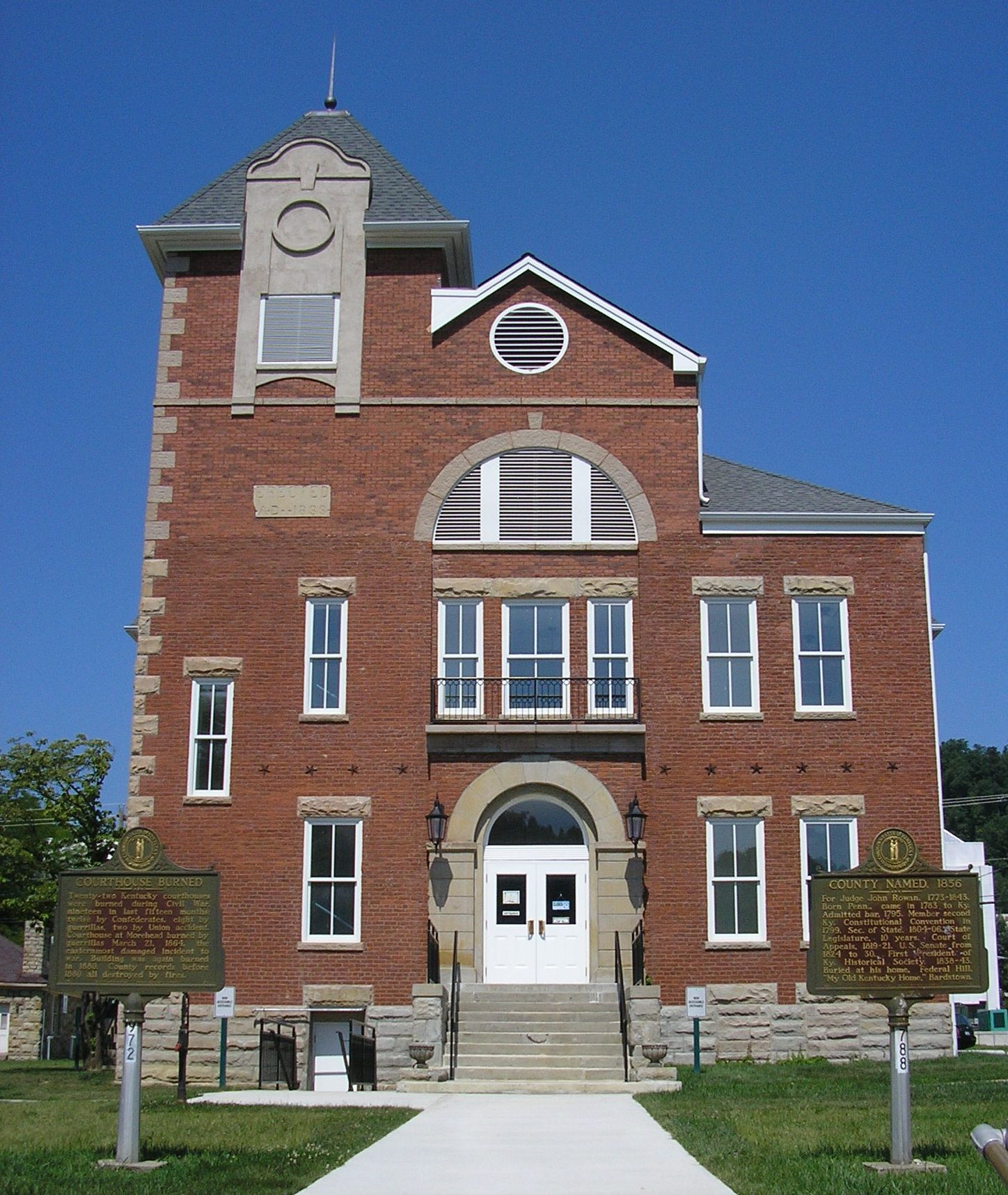
Rowan County Courthouse, in 2007

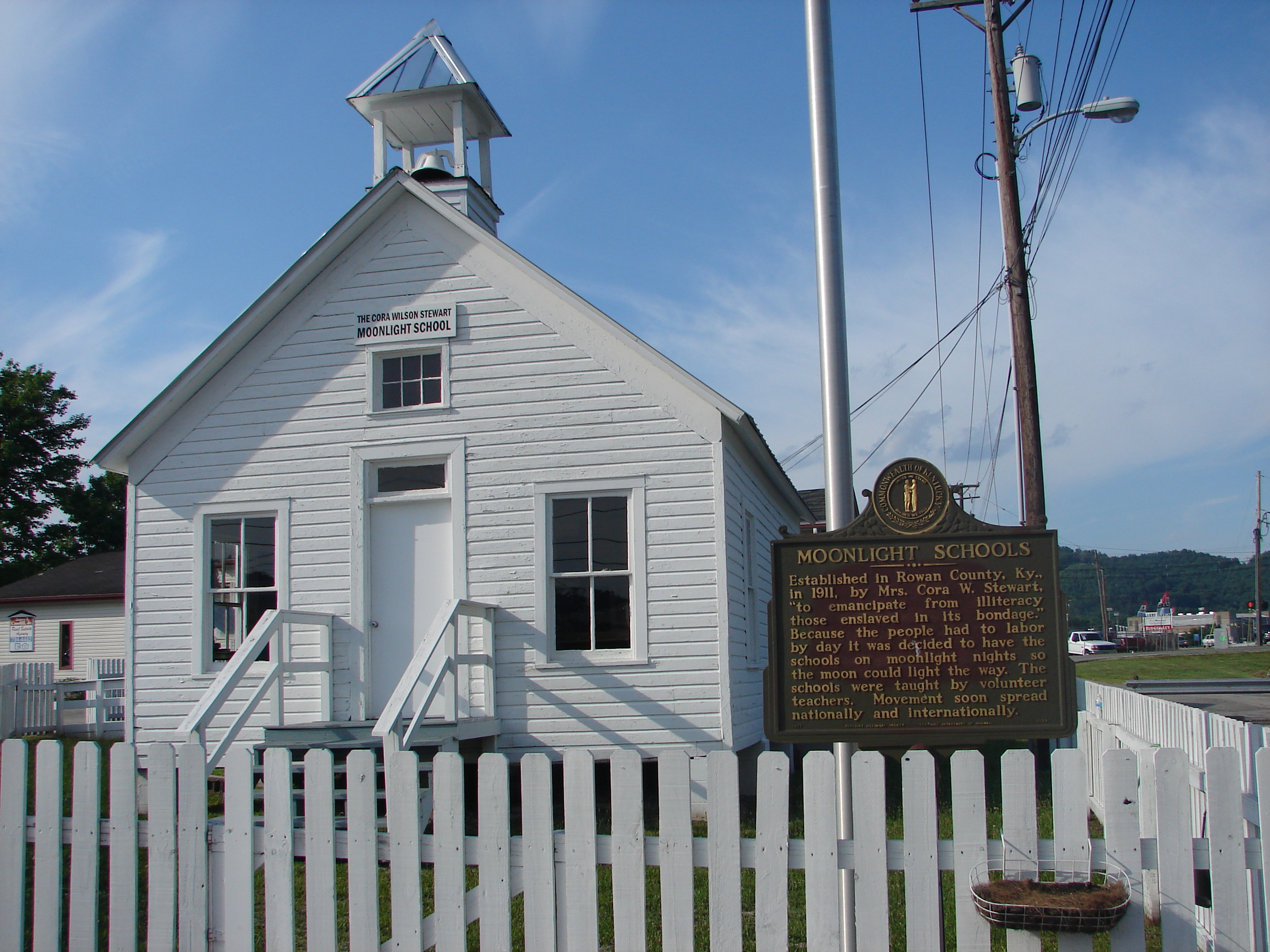
Midnight School, in 2009
