= Rowan County Courthouse =

- U.S. National Register of Historic Places
- U.S. Historic district – Contributing property
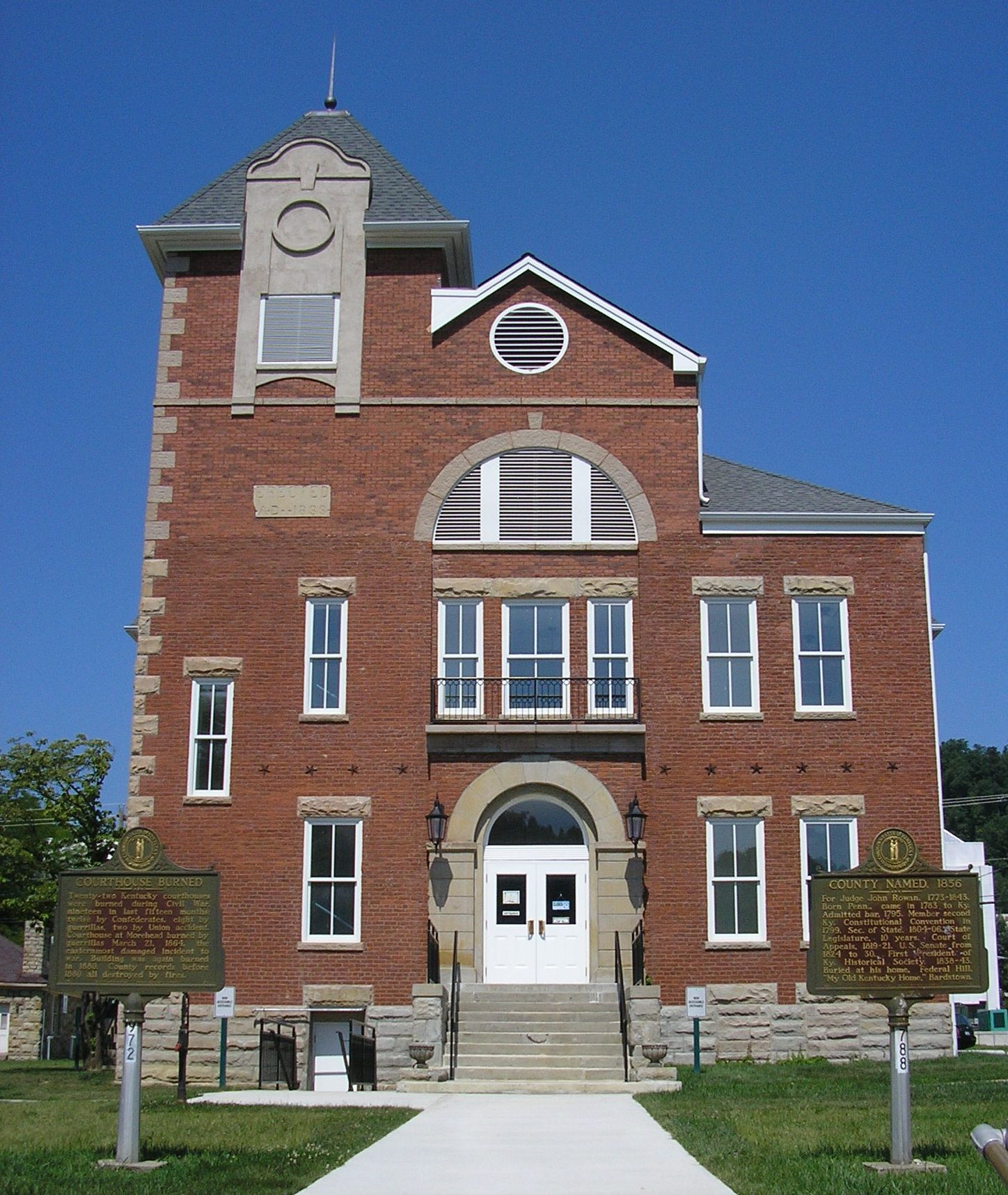

- Location within Kentucky Location within the United States
- Location: Main St., Morehead, Kentucky
- Coordinates: 38°11′03″N 83°26′00″W
- Area: 1 acre (0.40 ha) (original)
- Built: 1899
- Part of: Downtown Morehead Historic District (ID100006264)
- NRHP reference No.: 83002862

Significant dates
- Added to NRHP: July 21, 1983
- Designated CP: May 11, 2022

The Old Rowan County Courthouse, located on Main Street in Morehead, Kentucky, was built in 1899. Since the early 21st century, it is used as the home of the Rowan County Arts Center. It is a two-story brick building on a rusticated limestone foundation.

The courthouse was listed on the National Register of Historic Places in 1983. The listing was expanded by a boundary increase approved March 13, 2017. Additional documentation was also approved on that date.

It is also a contributing building in the 2022-designated Downtown Morehead Historic District.
