= Morehead, Kentucky =

- City
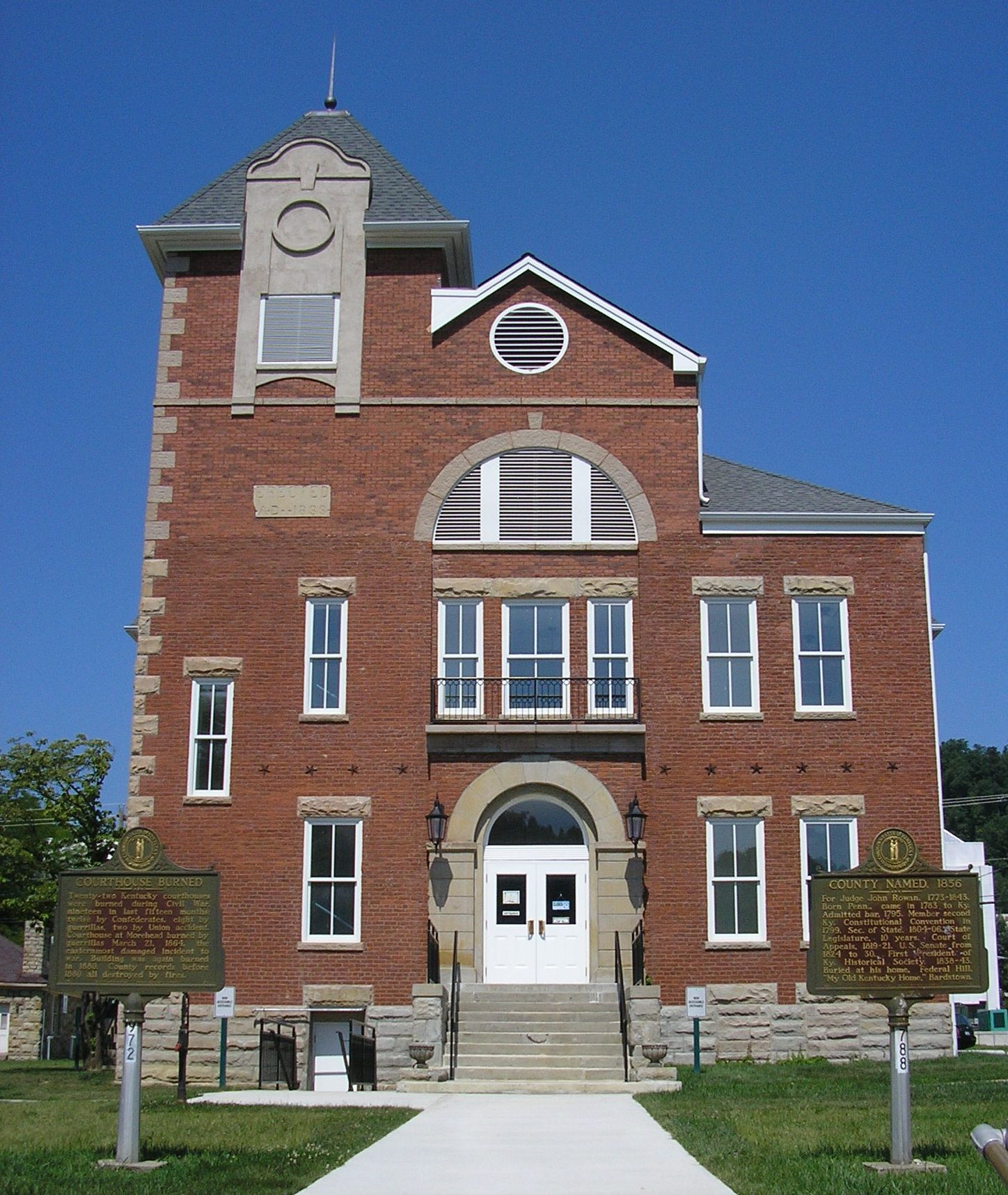
- Rowan County Arts Center in Morehead. (Formerly Rowan County Courthouse)

- Location of Morehead in Rowan County, Kentucky.
- Coordinates: 38°11′27″N 83°26′51″W
- Country: United States
- State: Kentucky
- County: Rowan
- Incorporated: 1869
- Named for: Gov. James Morehead

Area
  - Total: 9.72 sq mi (25.17 km^{2})
  - Land: 9.61 sq mi (24.88 km^{2})
  - Water: 0.12 sq mi (0.30 km^{2})
- Elevation: 997 ft (304 m)

Population (2020)
  - Total: 7,151
  - Estimate (2022): 6,734
  - Density: 744.5/sq mi (287.47/km^{2})
- Time zone: UTC-5 (Eastern (EST))
  - Summer (DST): UTC-4 (EDT)
- ZIP code: 40351
- Area code: 606
- FIPS code: 21-53418
- GNIS feature ID: 2404299
- Website: morehead-ky.gov

Morehead is a home rule-class city located along US 60 (the historic Midland Trail) and Interstate 64 in Rowan County, Kentucky, in the United States. It is the seat of its county. The population was 7,151 at the time of the 2020 U.S. census.

It was the focal point of the Rowan County War and is the home of Morehead State University.

== History ==
=== Initial settlement ===
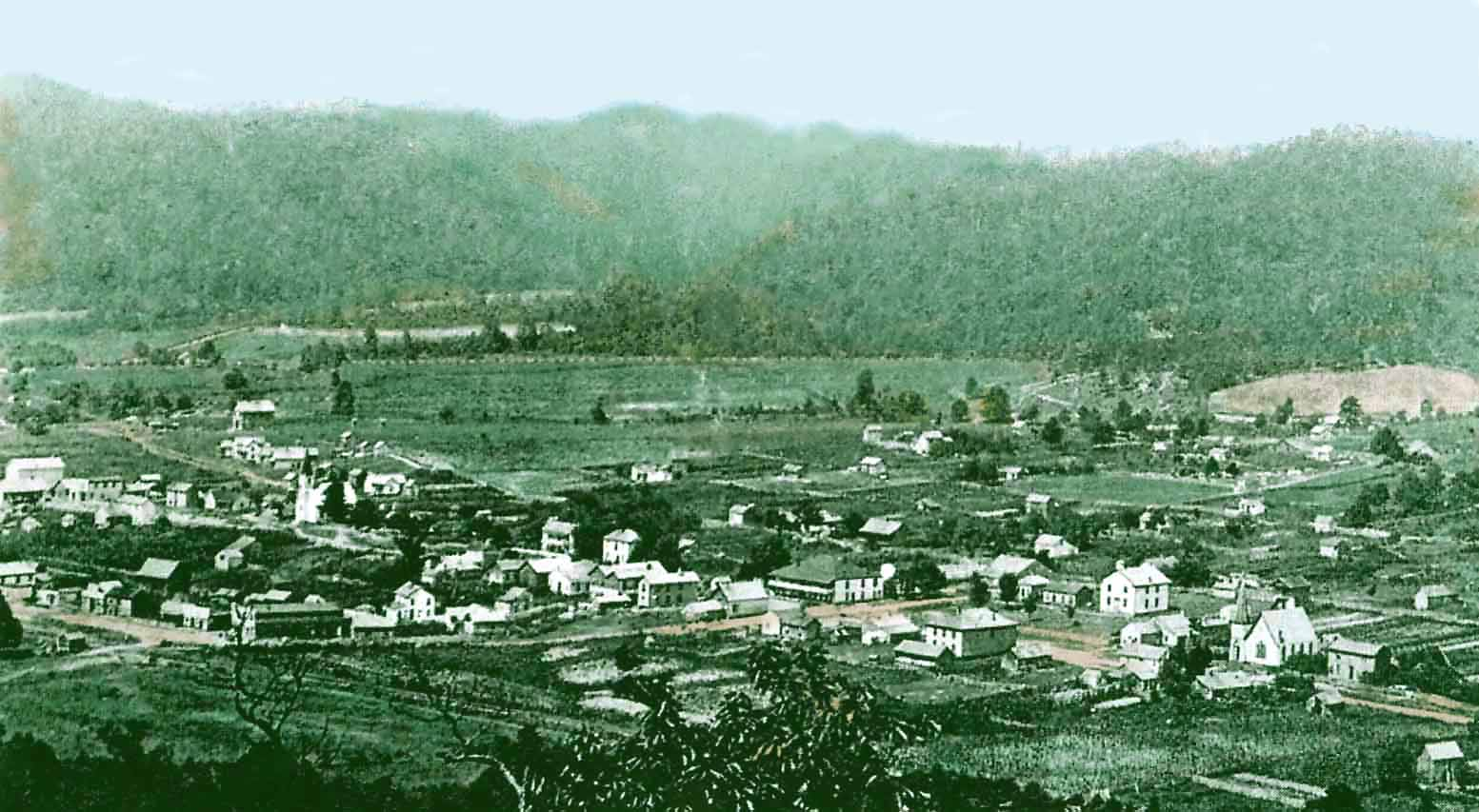
Morehead in 1890

The first European settlers came to Rowan County from Virginia following the end of the American Revolutionary War in 1783. In 1854, Morehead became the third community to be settled in the county. Colonel John Hargis founded the city after purchasing land in the area. The city was named after James T Morehead, a politician who served as governor of Kentucky from 1834 to 1836. Rowan County came into existence in May 1856, seceding from parts of Morgan County and Fleming County. It was divided into four districts with Morehead being declared the county seat. The formation of Rowan County was a political ploy to prevent Flemingsburg from moving its seat to Poplar Plains, and Morehead was selected as Rowan's seat because of its centrality. Although it was smaller and less developed than the neighboring town of Farmers, it remained a significant city in the county due its status as county seat. It was officially incorporated in 1869.

=== Rowan County War ===
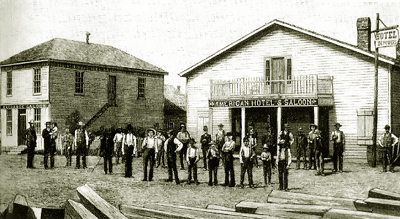
D.B. Logan's forces outside American Hotel

In the 1880s, Morehead became the central stage for a notorious conflict known as the Rowan County War or the Martin–Tolliver–Logan Feud. During a number of skirmishes for the next few years, at least 20 people were killed and possibly 100 were wounded. Beginning with an election-day barroom brawl, several gunfights took place in Morehead and the surrounding countryside. Eventually, a group led by Craig Tolliver seized political control of the town and installed allies in the county sheriff's and county attorney's offices as well as at the office of the town marshal. Several members of the opposing faction were arrested on trumped-up charges, and some were killed when the faction in power falsely claimed they had resisted arrest. The conflict gained national attention and on two occasions the governor sent troops to maintain order with little effect. Eventually a posse of as many as 100 individuals were organized and armed by Daniel Boone Logan with the tacit consent of Gov. J. Proctor Knott and Governor-elect Simon Buckner. In a dramatic two-hour gun battle through the center of Morehead, several Tollivers (including Craig) were killed and the Tollivers' control of the county was broken. Two men were later acquitted for the murder of Craig Tolliver. Morehead State University was established as an indirect result of the feud. After the state militia came to settle the feud, the Disciples of Christ established a church and school which served as the forerunner to the university.

=== 20th century ===
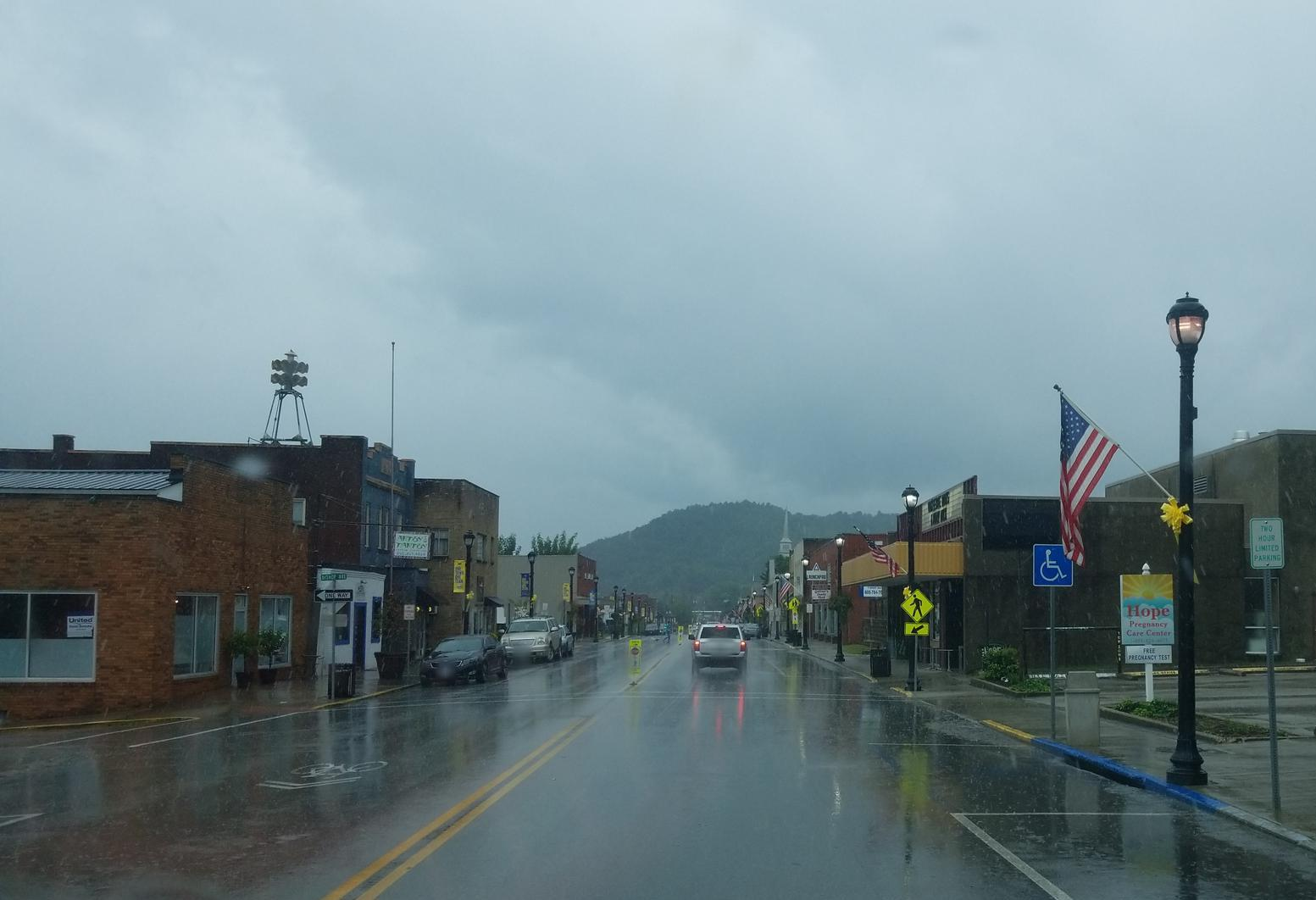
Main Street in Morehead

The industry improved in the early 20th century. It was considered an important shipping center in the region, and the city of Chesapeake, Ohio even carried out developments on the road system of Morehead. Its abundance of lumber, fire clay, farm products and gas made it an active center of industry, of which was mainly oriented towards agriculture. The close proximity of the Licking River helped ensure the population would flourish. In the 1920s, the city refocused its efforts towards fire clay extraction amidst the dwindling prices of timber. One of the first transcontinental auto trails in the US, the Midland Trail, was connected to Morehead in 1929.

In July 1939, a number of business and hotels located on Mainstreet were caught in a raging fire following Independence Day celebrations which went awry. The town's pack horse library center was burned down as well. Only 24 hours afterwards, the town was badly affected by flash flooding. At least 25 people died, and thousands had to receive vaccinations for Typhoid fever. The property costs incurred by the flooding were estimated at $1,000,000, while the damage inflicted on crops and farms caused an economic loss of about $500,000.

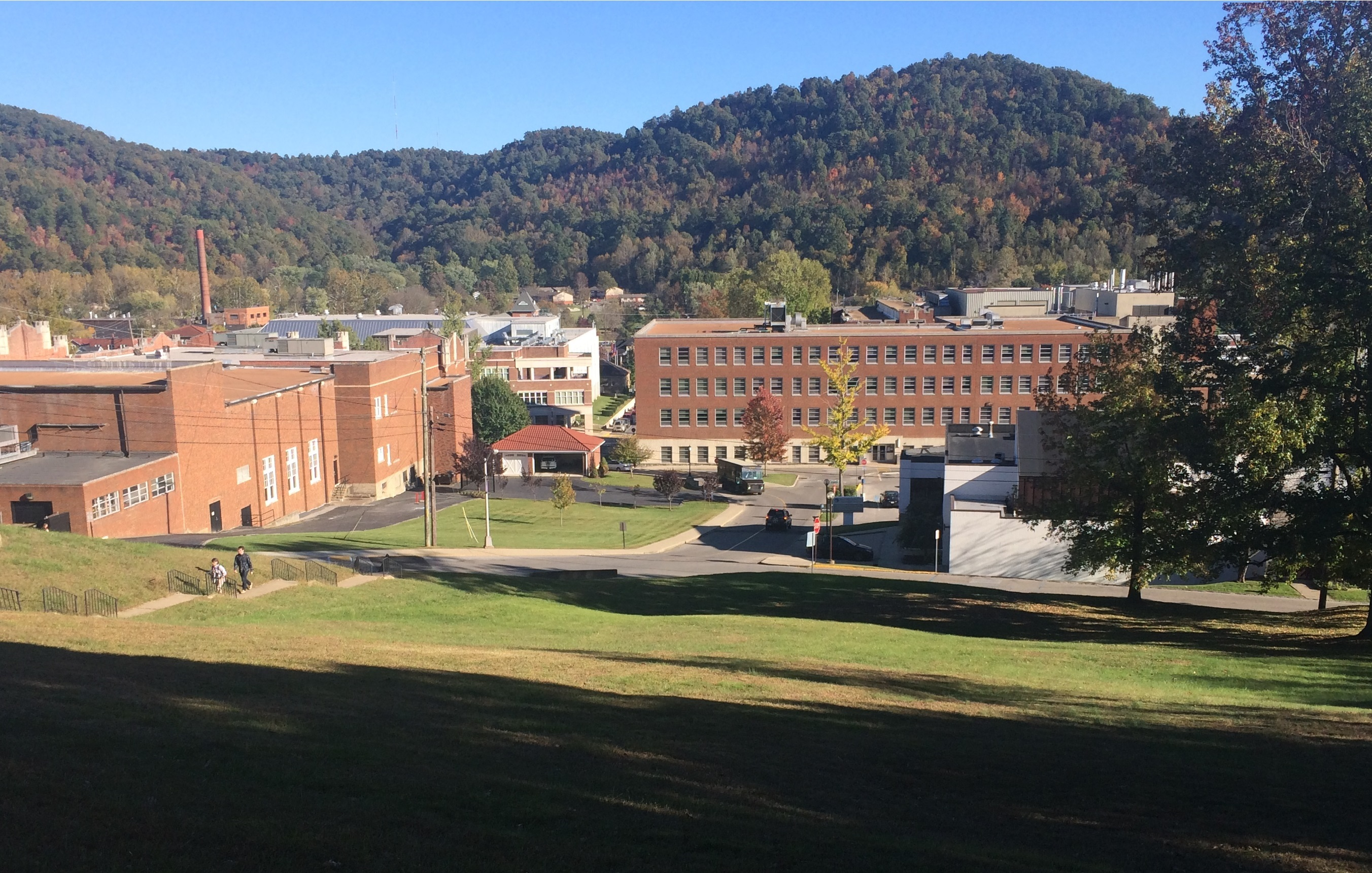
View of Morehead State University

In the early 1960s, efforts were underway to establish a local hospital. An agreement was eventually reached with the Sisters of Notre Dame in Covington, Kentucky in which the sisters would assume responsibility for operating the proposed hospital. In July 1963, St Claire's Medical Center was opened with a 41-bed capacity. Transport in and out of the city was greatly improved in 1969 after the completion of Interstate 64 to the north.

After the logging and extraction industries lost momentum in eastern Kentucky during the mid-1900s, the city invested heavily in developing Morehead State University as a means to secure economic growth. Morehead also sought to capitalize on tourism by ameliorating its natural attractions. Hiking trails were created through Cave Run Lake in the 1960s and 1970s, and in 1974, tourism was further boosted when Cave Run Lake was impounded by the city. By 1990, Morehead State University had become the largest employer in the city.

=== 21st century ===
In 2015, Kim Davis of Morehead gained international attention after she defied a federal court order requiring that as Clerk of Rowan County she issue a marriage license to a same-sex couple.

The Downtown Morehead Historic District was listed on the National Register of Historic Places in 2022.

== Railroads ==
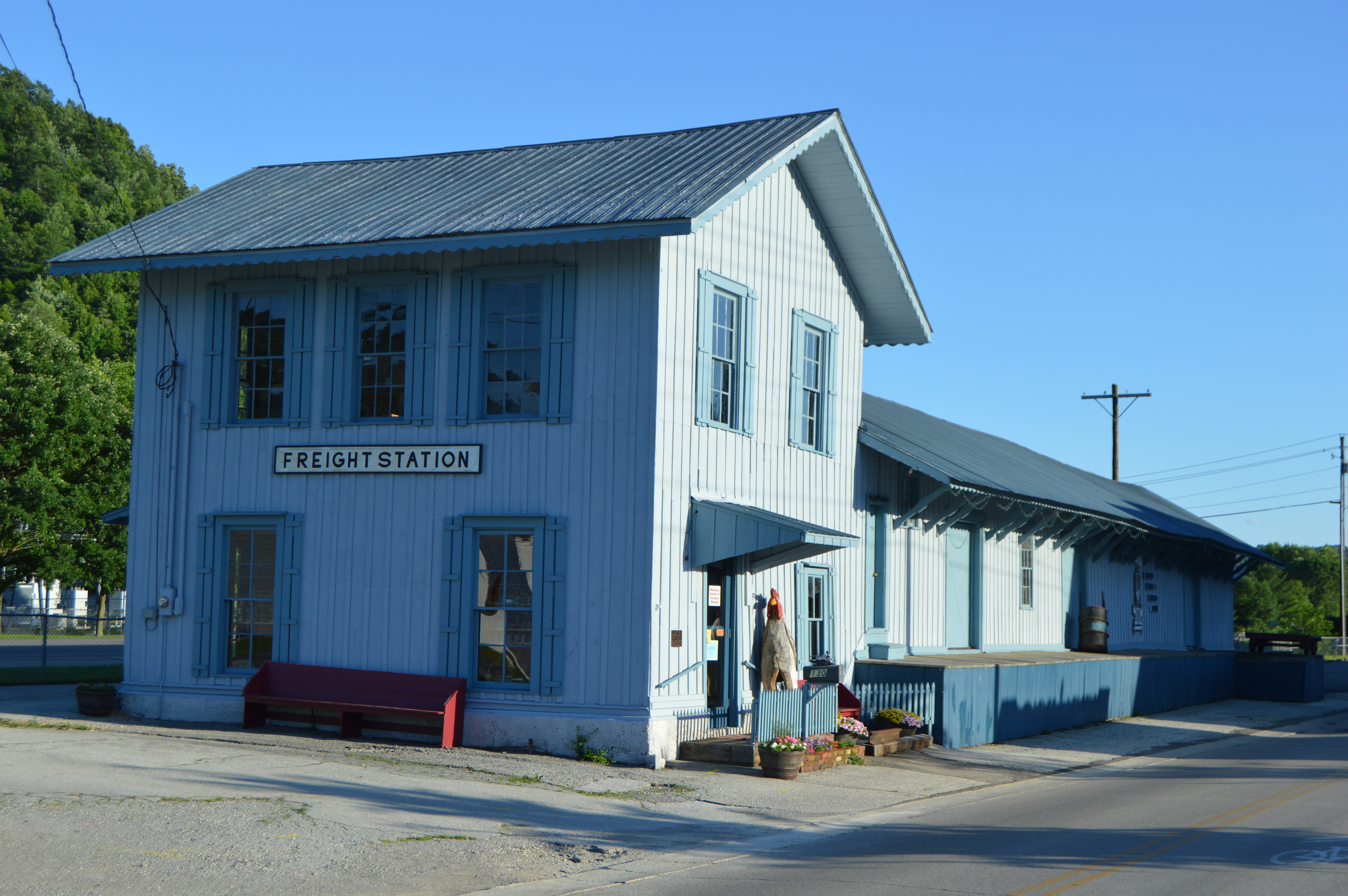
Former Chesapeake & Ohio Railway freight depot on East First Street in Morehead (built 1881), now preserved.

Morehead was reached by the Elizabethtown, Lexington and Big Sandy Railroad (EL&BS) in 1881, which built a combined passenger depot and freight station on Railroad Street (now First Street). Between 1886 and 1892 the route was leased and then acquired by the Chesapeake & Ohio Railway (C&O), becoming part of its Lexington Subdivision linking Ashland and Lexington via Rowan County. The former C&O right-of-way through town was abandoned in 1985-1986; the US 60 bypass follows portions of the old rail bed. Historic depots survive on First Street; the former depot houses the Morehead History & Railroad Museum, and the freight depot is listed on the National Register of Historic Places (NRHP).

A short line, the Morehead and North Fork Railroad, diverged at Morehead and ran south toward Clearfield, Clack Mountain, and originally to Redwine in Morgan County to serve timber, clay, and refractory industries. The route was cut back to about four miles between the C&O connection and Clack Mountain in 1933; steam operations continued until April 1, 1963. Operations ceased in January 1973 following Interstate Commerce Commission authorization to abandon the remaining trackage. Portions of the corridor have been reused as local roads and paths, and the derelict track was removed in 2001.

== Religion ==
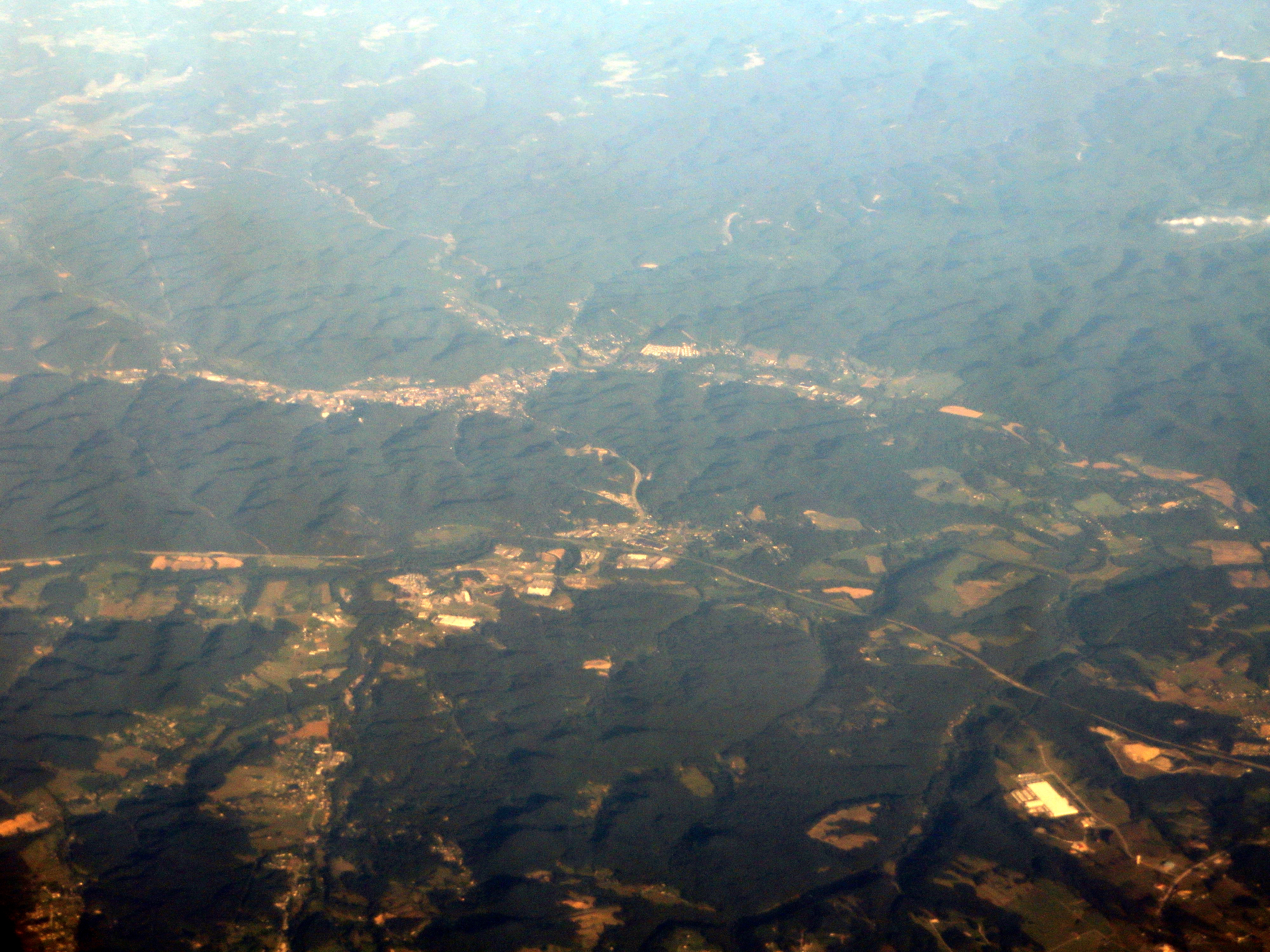
Aerial view of Morehead

As of 2000, Rowan County was the home of 25 Evangelical churches, four Mainline Protestant churches, one Catholic Church and one Church of Jesus Christ of Latter-day Saints (LDS) congregation. This represents a net increase of five congregations. Six congregations (all Evangelical) were established between 1990 and 2000, while one (also an Evangelical congregation) closed.

Rowan County is ranked 113th (of 120 counties in Kentucky) in overall rates of adherence, with only 249 out of every 1000 residents claimed as an adherent of a religious congregation. 129 of every 1000 residents was claimed by an Evangelical congregation (116th in rank), 50 by a Mainline congregation (91st in rank), 20 by the Catholic Church, and 37 by the Church of Jesus Christ of Latter-Day Saints. A small number of other residents belonged to religious groups not represented in one of these categories.

== Geography ==
=== Topography ===
According to the United States Census Bureau, Morehead has a total area of 9.3 square miles (24 km^{2}), of which 9.2 square miles (24 km^{2}) is land.

Morehead is in the foothills of the Appalachian Mountains. The topography of the area represents a mixture of the Highland Rim and the western border of the Eastern Kentucky Coalfield. The highest elevation in the county is Limestone Knob (1435 ft), situated approximately 3 miles southwest of Morehead. The elevation of the city is 748 ft.

=== Climate ===
Climate data for Morehead, Kentucky
Month	Jan	Feb	Mar	Apr	May	Jun	Jul	Aug	Sep	Oct	Nov	Dec	Year
Record high °F (°C)	80 (27)	81 (27)	89 (32)	93 (34)	95 (35)	104 (40)	105 (41)	106 (41)	103 (39)	96 (36)	85 (29)	79 (26)	106 (41)
Mean daily maximum °F (°C)	41 (5)	47 (8)	57 (14)	67 (19)	76 (24)	84 (29)	88 (31)	87 (31)	80 (27)	69 (21)	57 (14)	47 (8)	66.7 (19.3)
Mean daily minimum °F (°C)	22 (−6)	24 (−4)	32 (0)	40 (4)	50 (10)	59 (15)	63 (17)	62 (17)	55 (13)	42 (6)	35 (2)	27 (−3)	42.6 (5.9)
Record low °F (°C)	−28 (−33)	−19 (−28)	−9 (−23)	16 (−9)	25 (−4)	35 (2)	43 (6)	35 (2)	29 (−2)	13 (−11)	0 (−18)	−24 (−31)	−28 (−33)
Average precipitation inches (mm)	3.40 (86)	3.27 (83)	4.07 (103)	3.91 (99)	4.86 (123)	4.55 (116)	5.60 (142)	3.78 (96)	3.23 (82)	3.16 (80)	3.47 (88)	4.03 (102)	47.33 (1,202)
Source: The Weather Channel.

== Demographics ==
Historical population
Census	Pop.	Note	%±
1880	163		—
1890	491		201.2%
1900	1,100		124.0%
1910	1,105		0.5%
1920	981		−11.2%
1930	825		−15.9%
1940	1,901		130.4%
1950	3,102		63.2%
1960	4,170		34.4%
1970	7,191		72.4%
1980	7,789		8.3%
1990	8,357		7.3%
2000	5,914		−29.2%
2010	6,845		15.7%
2020	7,151		4.5%
2024 (est.)	6,789		−5.1%
U.S. Decennial Census

=== 2020 census ===
As of the 2020 census, Morehead had a population of 7,151. The median age was 22.1 years. 11.2% of residents were under the age of 18 and 11.7% of residents were 65 years of age or older. For every 100 females there were 84.6 males, and for every 100 females age 18 and over there were 81.6 males age 18 and over.

89.1% of residents lived in urban areas, while 10.9% lived in rural areas.

There were 2,046 households in Morehead, of which 19.6% had children under the age of 18 living in them. Of all households, 28.3% were married-couple households, 25.1% were households with a male householder and no spouse or partner present, and 38.7% were households with a female householder and no spouse or partner present. About 42.8% of all households were made up of individuals and 13.9% had someone living alone who was 65 years of age or older.

There were 2,442 housing units, of which 16.2% were vacant. The homeowner vacancy rate was 3.0% and the rental vacancy rate was 12.6%.

Racial composition as of the 2020 census
Race	Number	Percent
White	6,377	89.2%
Black or African American	247	3.5%
American Indian and Alaska Native	12	0.2%
Asian	88	1.2%
Native Hawaiian and Other Pacific Islander	1	0.0%
Some other race	211	3.0%
Two or more races	215	3.0%
Hispanic or Latino (of any race)	218	3.0%

=== 2000 census ===
As of the 2000 census, there were 5,914 people, 2,114 households, and 1,101 families residing in the city. The population density was 640.8 inhabitants per square mile (247.4/km^{2}). There were 2,347 housing units at an average density of 254.3 per square mile (98.2/km^{2}). The racial makeup of the city was 94.25% White, 2.57% African American, 0.15% Native American, 1.52% Asian, 0.02% Pacific Islander, 0.12% from other races, and 1.37% from two or more races. Hispanic or Latino of any race were 0.76% of the population.

There were 2,114 households, out of which 23.6% had children under the age of 18 living with them, 38.2% were married couples living together, 11.2% had a female householder with no husband present, and 47.9% were non-families. 36.1% of all households were made up of individuals, and 13.3% had someone living alone who was 65 years of age or older. The average household size was 2.14 and the average family size was 2.81.

In the city, the population was spread out, with 15.5% under the age of 18, 34.6% from 18 to 24, 20.6% from 25 to 44, 16.6% from 45 to 64, and 12.7% who were 65 years of age or older. The median age was 25 years. For every 100 females, there were 88.5 males. For every 100 females age 18 and over, there were 87.6 males.

The median income for a household in the city was $24,014, and the median income for a family was $34,375. Males had a median income of $23,950 versus $19,455 for females. The per capita income for the city was $13,415. About 16.7% of families and 26.0% of the population were below the poverty line, including 19.8% of those under age 18 and 15.6% of those age 65 or over.

== Tourism ==
In 1974, tourism was boosted by the impoundment of Cave Run Lake, the largest lake in Eastern Kentucky. Cave Run Lake is also known as the Musky Capitol of the South. A council, called Morehead-Rowan County Economic Development Council, was formed in 1991 in order to attract more industry and capitalize on tourism to Cave Run Lake. Hiking trails dating back to the 1960s and 1970s are still maintained for foot traffic around Cave Run Lake, however, officials are attempting to address the difficulties faced by cyclists and horseback riders crossing the trails.

In 2012, Morehead became a trail town, rerouting the Sheltowee Trace Trail through it. This gives trail users the ability to explore the town and get what they may need before heading back on the trail.

There are over thirty cycling trails in the county's section of Daniel Boone National Forest.

== Education ==
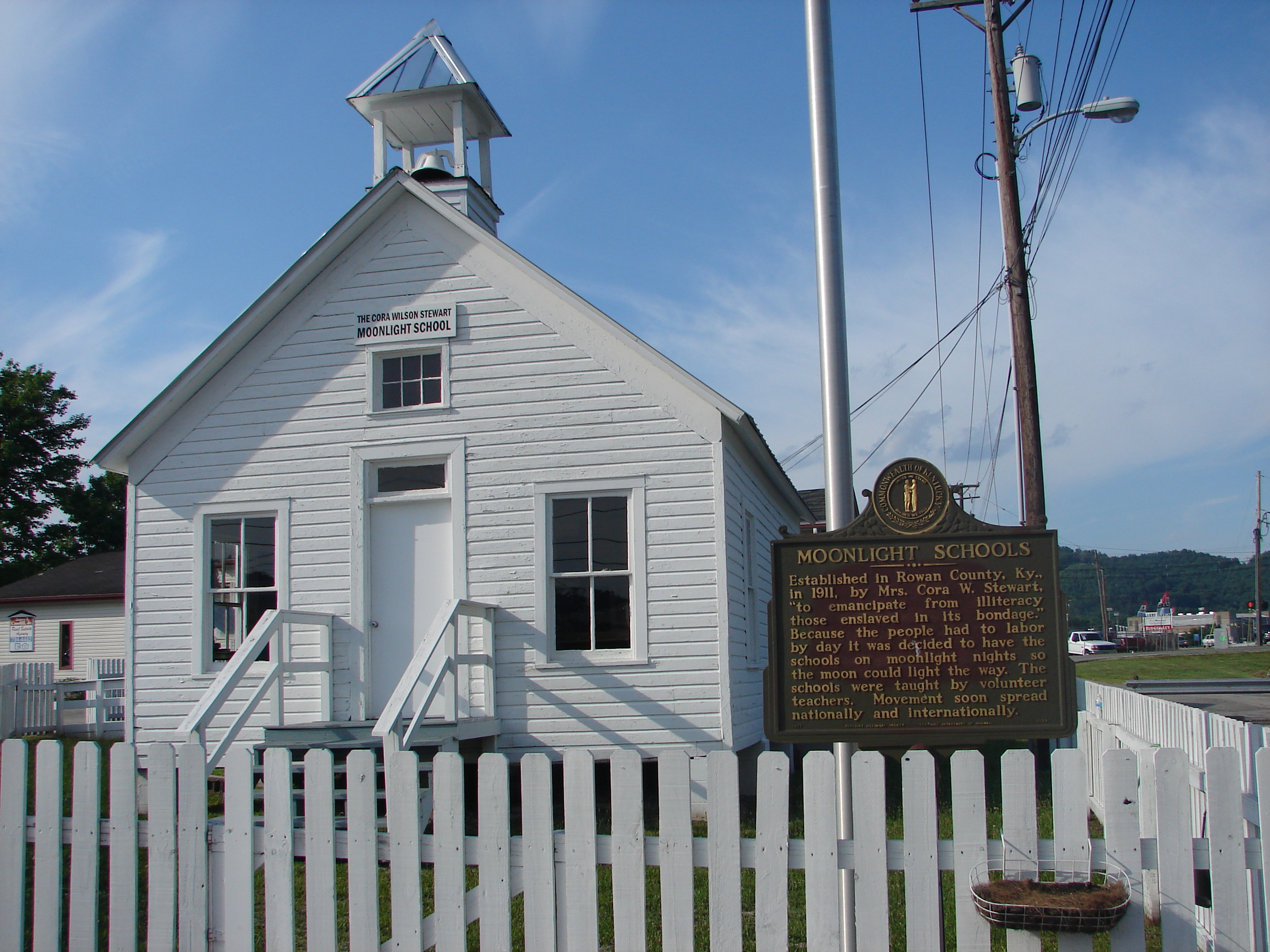
Moonlight School founded in 1911 by Cora Stewart

There are currently 9 public primary schools operating in Morehead, including:

- Clearfield Elementary
- Bluegrass Discovery Academy
- McBrayer Elementary
- Morehead Youth Development Center
- Rodburn Elementary
- Rowan County Middle School
- Rowan County Preschool Center
- Rowan County Senior High School
- Sunrise Children's Services
- Tilden Hogge Elementary School

Morehead also has the Craft Academy for Excellence in Science and Mathematics, an early entrance to college program for academically gifted high school juniors and seniors at Morehead State, that allows the students to take college credits while finishing high school.

Additionally, there are two institutions for higher education situated in the city. Morehead State University was established in 1887, and offers more than 100 degree programs. There is also a campus for Maysville Community and Technical College in the city.

Morehead has a lending library, the Rowan County Public Library.

== Media ==
=== Newspapers ===
- The Morehead News (Closed) – local newspaper.
- The Rowan County News (Est. 2020)

=== Radio stations ===
- WMKY 90.3 – Morehead State Public Radio
- WIVY 96.3 – Classic Hits
- WKCA 97.7 - Real Country
- WMOR-FM 106.1 – Adult Contemporary

=== Television station ===
- W10BM – defunct local television station, notable for operating without a license for nearly 20 years.

== Sister cities ==
Morehead has city partnerships with the following cities or regions:

- Yangshuo, Guangxi, China (since 1994)

Through Sister Cities International, Morehead has one sister city:

- Ballymena, Northern Ireland, United Kingdom

== See also ==
- Morehead State University
- Cave Run Lake
