= National Register of Historic Places listings in Wicomico County, Maryland =

Location of Wicomico County in Maryland

This is a list of the National Register of Historic Places listings in Wicomico County, Maryland.

This is intended to be a complete list of the properties and districts on the National Register of Historic Places in Wicomico County, Maryland, United States. Latitude and longitude coordinates are provided for many National Register properties and districts; these locations may be seen together in a map.

There are 25 properties and districts listed on the National Register in the county.

Contents: Counties in Maryland
Allegany - Anne Arundel - Baltimore (city) - Baltimore County - Calvert - Caroline - Carroll - Cecil - Charles - Dorchester - Frederick - Garrett - Harford - Howard - Kent - Montgomery - Prince George's - Queen Anne's - Somerset - St. Mary's - Talbot - Washington - Wicomico - Worcester

This National Park Service list is complete through NPS recent listings posted August 28, 2026.

== Current listings ==
	Name on the Register	Image	Date listed	Location	City or town	Description
1	Asbury Methodist Episcopal Church	Asbury Methodist Episcopal Church	August 27, 1999 (#99001041)	26679 Collins Wharf Rd. 38°17′25″N 75°41′26″W	Allen	
2	Beaudley	Beaudley	December 7, 2001 (#01001334)	3955 Jesterville Rd. 38°18′13″N 75°52′10″W	Tyaskin	
3	Bennett's Adventure	Bennett's Adventure	November 20, 1975 (#75000928)	3 miles west of Allen on Clifford Cooper Rd. 38°17′02″N 75°44′05″W	Allen	
4	Bounds Lott	Bounds Lott	November 14, 1978 (#78001488)	4146 Rivermere Lane; 38°18′32″N 75°44′56″W	Allen	
5	Delaware Boundary Markers	Delaware Boundary Markers	February 18, 1975 (#75002101)	Boundary line dividing Delaware from Maryland and Pennsylvania	Multiple	Extends into Delaware and southeastern Pennsylvania.
6	Delmar School		January 5, 2025 (#100012498)	1203 Pine Street; 38°27′08″N 75°33′41″W	Delmar	
7	Gillis-Grier House	Gillis-Grier House	October 31, 1972 (#72000589)	401 N. Division St. 38°22′14″N 75°35′54″W	Salisbury	
8	Honeysuckle Lodge	Honeysuckle Lodge	August 8, 1996 (#96000880)	1601 Camden Ave. 38°20′06″N 75°36′53″W	Salisbury	
9	Sen. William P. Jackson House	Sen. William P. Jackson House	September 28, 1976 (#76001022)	514 Camden Ave. 38°21′37″N 75°36′19″W	Salisbury	Demolished in 1976
10	Long Hill	Long Hill	December 31, 1974 (#74000978)	Wetipquin Ferry Rd; 38°19′32″N 75°50′07″W	Wetipquin	
11	Maple Leaf Farm Potato House	Maple Leaf Farm Potato House	June 1, 1998 (#98000544)	26632 Porter Mill Rd. 38°26′14″N 75°41′24″W	Hebron	
12	Pemberton Hall	Pemberton Hall	February 18, 1971 (#71000379)	Pemberton Rd. 38°20′52″N 75°38′40″W	Salisbury	
13	Perry-Cooper House	Perry-Cooper House	November 17, 1977 (#77000706)	200 E. William St. 38°22′10″N 75°35′51″W	Salisbury	
14	Poplar Hill Mansion	Poplar Hill Mansion	October 7, 1971 (#71000380)	117 Elizabeth St. 38°22′17″N 75°35′43″W	Salisbury	
15	San Domingo School	San Domingo School	February 16, 2007 (#07000044)	11526 Old School Rd. 38°30′39″N 75°43′22″W	Sharptown	
16	Spring Hill Church	Spring Hill Church	October 22, 1976 (#76001021)	1 mile northeast of Hebron at the junction of U.S. Route 50 and Maryland Route 347; 38°25′46″N 75°40′25″W	Hebron	Destroyed by fire on July 22, 2014.
17	St. Bartholomew's Episcopal Church	St. Bartholomew's Episcopal Church	June 5, 1975 (#75000929)	Green Hill Church Rd. 38°17′30″N 75°47′30″W	Quantico	
18	St. Giles	St. Giles	December 20, 1982 (#82001602)	Southwest of Hebron on Maryland Route 347; 38°24′50″N 75°41′57″W	Hebron	
19	Union Station	Union Station	May 2, 2007 (#07000389)	611 Railroad Ave. 38°22′16″N 75°35′35″W	Salisbury	
20	United States Post Office	United States Post Office	April 26, 2016 (#16000199)	129 East Main St. 38°21′55″N 75°35′59″W	Salisbury	Now the Maude R. Toulson Federal Building
21	F. Leonard Wailes Law Office	F. Leonard Wailes Law Office	April 14, 1997 (#97000314)	116-118 E. Main St. 38°21′55″N 75°35′59″W	Salisbury	
22	Western Fields	Western Fields	June 12, 1987 (#87000641)	Porter Mill Rd. 38°26′05″N 75°41′23″W	Hebron	
23	Whitehaven Historic District	Whitehaven Historic District	January 9, 1980 (#80001843)	Whitehaven Rd., Church and River Sts., and Cinder and Locust Lanes; 38°16′07″N 75°47′28″W	Whitehaven	
24	Whitehaven Hotel	Whitehaven Hotel	May 10, 1996 (#96000535)	Whitehaven Rd. at its junction with River St. 38°16′07″N 75°47′20″W	Whitehaven	
25	Wicomico River Bridge	Wicomico River Bridge	September 15, 2025 (#100012231)	400 W. Main Street (address of Operator’s House parcel)/ MD 991(Main Street) over the Wicomico River; 38°21′55″N 75°36′16″W	Salisbury	Historic Highway Bridges of Maryland, 1694-1965 MPS
26	Yellow Brick House	Yellow Brick House	May 22, 1978 (#78001489)	22342 Capitola Road (MD 352); 38°18′07″N 75°50′25″W	Bivalve	

== See also ==
- List of National Historic Landmarks in Maryland
- National Register of Historic Places listings in Maryland
