= Carver Junior College =

Carver Junior College may refer to:

- Carver Junior College (Florida), Defunct Historically Black College in Cocoa, Florida
- Carver Junior College (Maryland), Defunct Historically Black College in Rockville, Maryland
