= Richard Bennett (Virginia politician) =

Governor of the Virginia Colony (1652-1655)

The Honorable Richard Bennett Esq.

Governor of the Virginia Colony
- In office 30 April 1652 – 31 March 1655
- Preceded by: Sir William Berkeley
- Succeeded by: Edward Digges

Member of the Virginia Governor's Council
- In office 1639 – 1675

Member of the House of Burgesses for Warrosquyoake
- In office 1629 Serving with Nathaniel Basse, Thomas Jordan, Robert Savin
- Preceded by: Edward Bennett
- Succeeded by: John Atkins

Personal details
- Born: baptized August 6, 1609 Wiveliscombe, Somerset, England
- Died: 1676 Bennett's Choice plantation, Virginia Colony, British America
- Spouse: Mrs. Mary Ann Utie
- Children: Richard, Anna Bennett Bland Codd, Elizabeth Scarborough
- Parent: Thomas Bennett
- Profession: Governor, military officer, planter

Richard Bennett (1608 – 12 April 1675) was an English planter and Governor of the Colony of Virginia, serving 1652–1655. He had first come to the Virginia colony in 1629 to represent his merchant uncle Edward Bennett's business, managing his plantation known as Bennett's Welcome in Warrascoyack (later known as Isle of Wight County). Two decades later, Bennett immigrated to the Maryland colony with his family, and settled on the Severn River in Anne Arundel County.

Bennett also acquired his own land patents, ultimately owning and developing thousands of acres in Virginia and Maryland. Initially, he settled with other Puritans in Nansemond. There he and others later converted to become Quakers under the influence of George Fox. In 1665 he acquired 2500 acres at what is known as Bennett's Adventure, developing a plantation on Wicomico Creek in Wicomico County, Maryland.

== Early and family life ==
Coat of Arms of Richard Bennett

Born in Wiveliscombe, Somerset in 1608 and christened 6 August 1609, Bennett served as governor from 30 April 1652, until some time in March, 1655 (2 March 1655) or 31 March. His uncle, Edward Bennett, was a wealthy merchant from London and one of the few Puritan members of the Virginia Company. He received a land patent in 1621 and transported 120 persons to settle a plantation in Warrascoyack. He was helped by his brothers Robert (who managed it until his death either during the massacre of 1622 or 1624), and Richard (who took over management but died himself in 1626). Edward Bennett went to the colony himself, along with his nephew Richard Bennett (the subject of this article) and won election to represent his plantation and neighbors in the House of Burgesses in 1628. He returned to England the following year, leaving Richard in charge.

== Career ==
After assuming management of his uncle's Virginia business interests and taking his seat in the House of Burgesses in 1629, Richard rose to prominence in the business, political, and religious life of the colony. He became leader of the small Puritan community south of the James River, taking them from Warrasquyoake to the drainage of the Nansemond River beginning in 1635. Warrasquyoake was renamed as Isle of Wight County in 1637 and Nansemond County was formally split from Isle of Wight county in 1646.

Governor Francis Wyatt with the consent of the Crown in London appointed Bennett as a member of the Governor's Council in 1639–42, and he would intermittently serve in what was the colony's upper house (and highest court) for the rest of his life, albeit with interruptions during an unstable era. In 1646, near the beginning of the English Civil War, Puritans from Nansemond formed part of the force sent by Virginia Governor William Berkeley to restore order in Maryland after the "Plundering Time".

In 1648, under political and religious pressure during the English Civil War, and upon the invitation of new Maryland governor William Stone of Hungers Creek, Bennett became one of the leaders of the Virginia Puritans who received a grant from Lord Baltimore and established a settlement on the Severn River in Anne Arundel County, Maryland. There, Bennett received at least one land grant of 250 acres on the banks of the Severn River near the Broadneck Peninsula known as the Towne Neck or later Greenberry Point, and returned to Virginia for settlers on what they called "Providence". He subsequently received two large grants of 1150 and 1250 acres called Upper Bennett and Lower Bennett on the Cliffs of Patuxent, upon which he settled associates from Nansemond. From 1651 until 1657-8, Bennett held a parliamentary commission for Virginia and worked with William Claiborne to annex Maryland to Virginia. During this time (especially in 1655 as discussed below) Bennett returned to England to oppose Lord Baltimore's claim to Maryland.

Meanwhile, Virginia Governor William Berkeley, who had been appointed in 1641, was sympathetic to the Crown during the English Civil War. Sir William Berkeley even fought for the deposed King Charles before returning to Virginia to quell raids by Native Americans on the relatively young colony. But on 12 March 1652, in a negotiation partly arranged by Bennett, Berkeley surrendered to representatives of Cromwell's Commonwealth government when they arrived in Virginia, and the colony's secretary Mathew Kemp became Virginia's acting governor.

The Virginia House of Burgesses then unanimously elected Bennett, who had returned to Virginia, as that colony's governor on 30 April 1652. Much of Bennett's time as governor involved negotiations both on behalf of the two colonies with officials in England, and with Native Americans. He negotiated with the Susquehannock tribe (which spoke an Iroquoian language) and signed a treaty with them on 5 July 1652. Under this, they ceded their claims to "all the land lying from the Patuxent River unto Palmer's Island on the western side of the bay of Chesapeake, and from the Choptank River to the northeast branch which lies to the northward of Elk River on the eastern side of the bay." Some of this area continued to be claimed by the Nanticoke tribe, however, which was an Algonquian-speaking tribe, with a different culture.

On 30 March 1655, Bennett voluntarily abandoned his Virginia office (the House of Burgesses electing fellow planter Edward Digges governor in his stead), and sailed for England to see Oliver Cromwell. He was back in London on 30 November 1657 when he signed the treaty with Cecilius Calvert, 2nd Baron Baltimore, which recognized the latter's claim to Maryland. Back in Virginia, Bennett again attended the Governor's Council and was later commissioned as a major-general in that colony's militia.

In 1665, his son, Richard Bennett Jr., who represented Baltimore County in Maryland's Assembly patented 2500 acres on the north bank of Wicomico Creek, on Maryland's Eastern Shore, in what is now Wicomico County. The plantation became known as Bennett's Adventure.

In 1667 Bennett led English colonial forces against a four vessel Dutch fleet marauding through the Hampton Roads area.

In early 1671, George Fox, founder of the Quaker movement, who had been released from Scarborough Castle in Yorkshire in 1666, set sail for the American colonies. He initially landed in Jamaica, then visited Barbados (the wealthiest colony in that era) before setting sail for Maryland. There Fox attended the First General Meeting of Friends at West River in Anne Arundel County in April 1672. After Fox journeyed to The Cliffs in Calvert County, he, missionary John Burnyears, Robert Widders and George Patterson sailed for the Eastern Shore (where they set up what became the Third Haven Meeting at Easton), while sending John Cartwright and James Lancaster to New England, and William Edmundson and others to visit Virginia Puritans in Nansemond County. Fox preached and planted Meetings in many areas, especially around Chesapeake Bay, and met the Speaker of the Maryland Assembly (Samuel Chew, who with his wife Ann Ayres were ardent Quakers) as well as two members of the Maryland Governor's Council and a persecuted justice from the Potomac area of Virginia, before returning to England from the Patuxent Roads area two years after he had left. Accounts differ as to whether Edmundson or Fox himself converted Bennett to his faith.

== Personal life ==
Richard Bennett was the son of Thomas Bennett (1570–1616) of Wiveliscombe, Somerset, England. In 1666, Virginia Secretary of State Thomas Ludwell wrote to Henry Bennet, 1st Earl of Arlington that Richard Bennett seemed to be of the same family, sharing the same coat of arms (also shared by the Bennetts of North Bavant, Wiltshire). Biographer John Boddie, however, discounted the accuracy of the report.

By 1642, Richard Bennett married Mrs. Mary Ann Utie, the widow of councillor John Utie, Sr. who had died in England in 1637. She and Utie had three sons: John Utie Jr. (1620-1642), Capt. Nathaniel Utie (d. 1675) and George Utie (d. 1678). Bennetts children, all born in the 1640s, were:

- Richard Bennett Jr. married Henrietta Maria Neale, daughter of James Neale. They had daughter Susannah Bennett Darnall Lowe (1666-1714) and son Richard Bennett, 3rd (1667-1749). Bennett prepared his will 29 Jan 1666 in Maryland prior to his voyage to England, likely to represent his father's business interests. He died there by 6 May 1667, the date his will was probated. Both children were born in England but returned to Maryland in 1677, two years after their grandfather's death. (Richard 3rd had inherited the bulk of Governor Bennett's estate). Bennett's widow later married Philemon Lloyd.
- Anna Bennett (died November 1687 in Cecil County, Maryland), first married Virginia merchant and speaker of the House of Burgesses Theodorick Bland of Westover in 1660 and had three sons: Theodorick Bland, Richard Bland (who had many notable descendants), and John Bland, great-grandfather of Chancellor Theodorick Bland of Maryland. Her second marriage was to immigrant, burgess and Col. St. Leger Codd(1680-1732), and they had one son, also named St. Leger Codd (1680-1732).
- Elizabeth Bennett (died 1719), who became the third wife of Col. Charles Scarborough of Accomac County, the son of councilor Edmund Scarborough (1617-1671) and his wife, the former Mary Littleton, and who bore at least eight children, of whom six survived her.

== Death and legacy ==
Bennett probably died on his Virginia plantation, although many descendants would also live in Maryland, including his grandson Richard Bennett III. He is considered one of the founders of Annapolis, which later became that colony's capital. The Wicomico County, Maryland house built by the next owner of Bennett's Adventure in the eighteenth century still stands, and in 1975 was listed on the National Register of Historic Places.

Bennett's descendants include Richard Bland II, John Randolph of Roanoke, Henry Lee III, Robert E. Lee, and Roger Atkinson Pryor.

== See also ==
- Colony of Virginia
- Governor's Palace
- List of colonial governors of Virginia
- History of Virginia
- Bennett's Adventure

== Literature ==
- Claus Bernet: Bennett, Richard (1609–1675), in: Biographisch-Bibliographisches Kirchenlexikon, vol. 35, Nordhausen 2014, Sp. 43–45.
