= Edward Bennett (colonist) =

English merchant and colonist

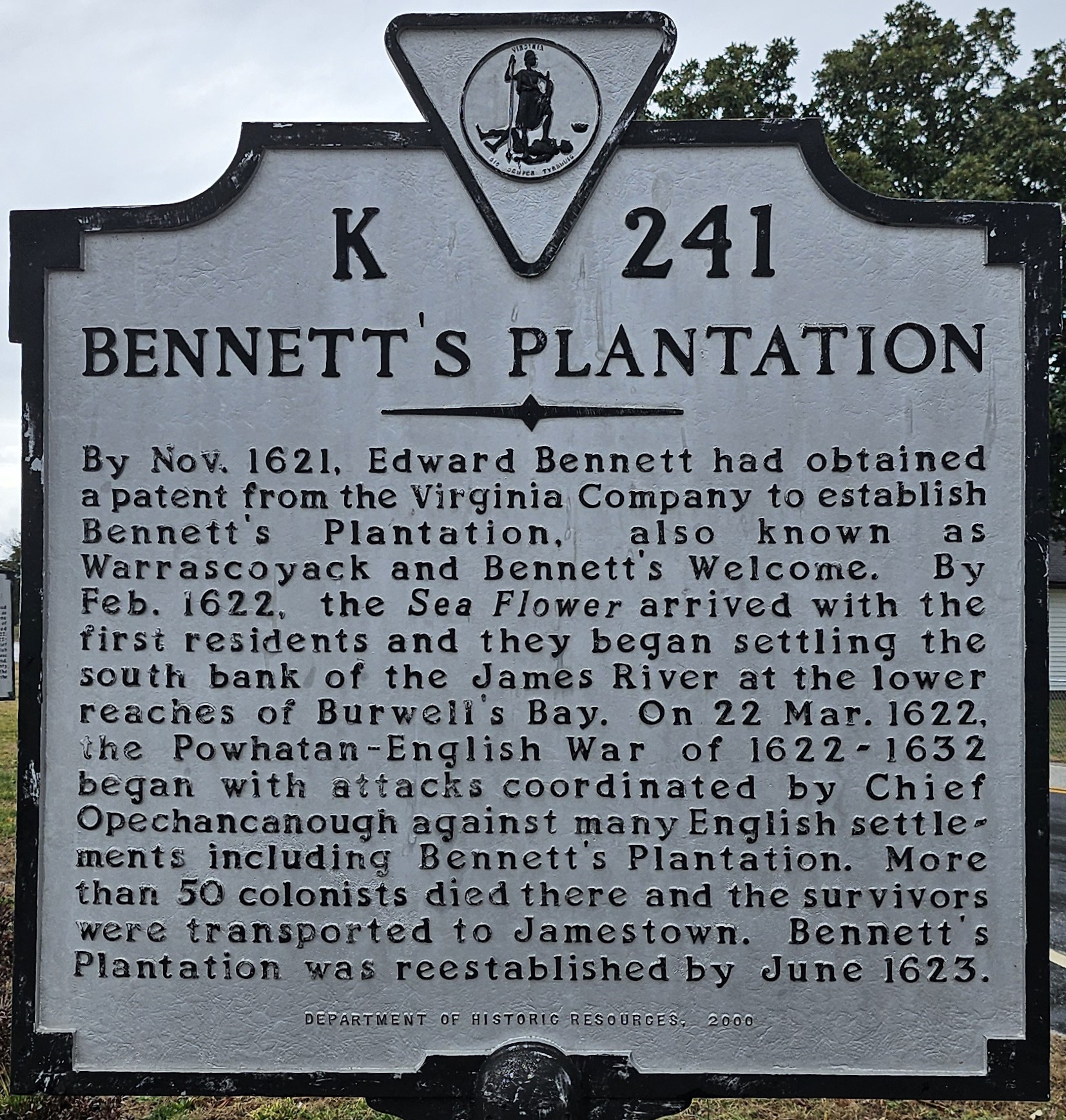
- Bennett's Plantation historical marker
- Born: 2 February 1577; Wiveliscombe, Somerset, Kingdom of England
- Died: Before 3 June 1651 probably in London, England where he had long resided.
- Other names: Bennet
- Occupation: Merchant

Edward Bennett (b. 1577 – d. c. 1651), was an English merchant based in London, and a free member of the Virginia Company. A Puritan who had lived in Amsterdam for a period, he established the first large plantation in the colony of Virginia in North America, in what became known as Warrosquyoake Shire (later as Isle of Wight County).

To satisfy headright requirements, men granted land patents had to recruit new settlers. Bennett is credited with recruiting more than 600 immigrants to the new world, most of whom were transported as indentured servants, required to work off their passage for periods of five or seven years. The colony of Virginia needed workers to support its development.

Despite his involvement in developing Virginia, Bennett was based in London for most of his career. It was the center of his trading and political connections. He married there and all of his nine children were born there.

== Early years ==
Edward Bennett was born 2 February 1577, the 15th child of Robert Bennett, a tanner, and Elizabeth (Adney) Bennett of Wiveliscombe, Somerset. Edward was christened in the parish church of Wiveliscombe on 5 June 1577. Later as an adult, as part of the Protestant Reformation he became associated with the Puritans, who supported Calvinism and wanted to return the Anglican Church to early simplicity.

Bennett became a successful merchant, established in trade with the Netherlands and later with the North American colonies. Bennett and his associates, Richard Wiseman, and Thomas Wiseman, were members of the Virginia Company in London, also known as the London Company, chartered by the Crown in 1606 to develop settlements on the coast of North America. They often sided with the faction led by the Earl of Warwick. The Wisemans were from the County of Essex and owned the manor of Rivenhall in Witham Hundred on the Blackwater River.

As part of his business as a wealthy London merchant, Bennett owned a large fleet of ships used for trading with Virginia and the Netherlands. He was also appointed as a Commissioner of Virginia at the Court of England.

== Marriage and family ==
Bennett married Mary Bourne at All Hallows Church, City of London, England on 1 April 1619. She was the daughter of Jasper Bourne of Stanmore Magna, a merchant from a prominent Somerset family, and his wife.

Mary appears to have been about age 14, some 28 years younger than Edward when they married. All their nine children were born in London; three died before reaching the age of five. The christenings of the last five children are recorded at St Olave parish, Hart Street, London.

- Joan Bennett, christened in London 1621
- Edward Bennett, christened in London 1623
- Mary Bennett, christened in London 1624
- Alice Bennett, christened in London 1626
- Elizabeth Bennett, christened in London 1629, died 1632
- Sylvestra Bennett, christened in London 1630, died about 1706 in Virginia
- John Bennett, christened in London 1632
- Ann Bennett, christened in London 1633, died 1634
- Jasper Bennett, christened in London 1634, died 1638

== Puritan migrations ==
Because of religious persecution from the established Anglican Church, Bennett and his family joined the Puritan migrations, settling for a period in Amsterdam, the Netherlands. His status as a successful merchant meant that he was selected as an elder of the Ancient Church established by the Puritans. His wife, Mary Bourne Bennett, however, was a Roman Catholic from a "recusant" Catholic family in Somerset. Her grandfather Bourne's brother Sir Gilbert Bourne was appointed Lord Bishop of Bath and Wells (Somerset) by Queen Mary. Queen Elizabeth I required him to accept the Established Church and, when he refused, he was removed from his see and placed under house arrest with the Cavendish family in Devon, the Earls of Devon. Bishop Bourne died there and is buried with the Cavendishes.

== Settlement of the colony of Virginia ==
The Virginia Company initially was commissioned by the Crown to settle and develop the colony of Virginia. Puritan merchant Christopher Lawne developed the first English plantation in the Warrosquoake region, dating to 1618. Several other Puritans also settled nearby.

Edward Bennett received a land patent here in 1621 from the Virginia Company, and began to recruit people in order to fulfill the headrights clause requiring him to settle 200 persons there. These were mostly indentured servants, as the colony needed labor to develop the plantations. Under the terms of indenture, workers could get passage by ship to the colony, and then work for a period of years as farm or domestic laborers to pay off their passage and board. Bennett named his plantation Warrosquoake, an indigenous name for the nearby river and a local tribe of the loose Powhatan Confederacy. Its 30 tribes dominated the coastal areas of Virginia. The Warrosquoake had historically occupied this Tidewater area.

Bennett's associates in this settlement effort were his brothers, Robert and Richard Bennett; his nephew, Richard Bennett; Thomas Ayres, Thomas Wiseman, and Richard Wiseman. The first settlers recruited by Bennett arrived on the Seaflower in February 1622. There were 120 settlers, led by Captain Ralph Hamor, a member of the Virginia Council who had previously visited Virginia in 1609. Also in the group were George Harrison and Rev. William Bennett, kinsman of Edward Bennett.

=== Great Indian Massacre ===
The indigenous tribes of the Powhatan Confederacy were unhappy about competing with the English colonists for game and territory, and tensions rose between them. They gathered in force, conducting the Indian massacre of 1622 in an effort to expel the colonists from their territory.

Bennett's plantation suffered many casualties, losing 53 settlers, a large percentage of the 347 persons killed that day across the various plantations along both sides of the James River. His brother survived. The settlement was briefly abandoned as the colonists retreated to properties on the north side of the river and closer to Jamestown, which was fortified. From the eighty plantations in largely coastal Virginia before the massacre, the surviving inhabitants gathered together for safety in eight plantations near Jamestown. The south side of the James River for fourteen miles (23 km), down river from Hog Island, was deserted for a time after the massacre.

In the Fall of 1622, Governor George Yeardley commanded an expedition which drove out the Warrosquoyacke and the Nansemond peoples from their villages and the Jamestown area. Some settlers returned after that to the south side of the James River.

=== Renewal of continued settlement ===
A fort was built near Bennett's plantation. Because most English settlements in Warrosquoyake were destroyed in the massacre on 22 March 1622, generally settlement in the county is counted from after that time. A census of settlers in 1623 shows on 16 February a total of "33, including 4 negroes" at Bennett's plantation and another 20 at Basse's Choice. A year later there was a total population of 31 settlers recorded for the Warrosquoyacke region. In 1625, Warrosquoyacke included an African couple (Antionio who had arrived on the 'James' in 1621 and his wife Mary who in 1622 arrived on the 'Margaret and John'); the couple had moved to Virginia's Eastern Shore by 1625, where records show them as free by 1630-1631.

Bennett's brother Robert died in 1624. Richard came out from England to replace him as manager of the plantation, sometimes called "Bennett's Welcome". Richard died in 1626, after a short time in the colony, where mortality rates were high.

In 1627, after having lost a ship to pirates, Bennett was granted a Letter of Marque by the Duke of Buckingham, Lord High Admiral, and commissioned to take pirates and enemy ships. It is likely he was part of an expedition under Buckingham that year to rescue French Huguenots from the siege of Rochelle.

Edward Bennett himself was the next to travel to Virginia to oversee his plantation. While in Virginia, he represented his plantation in the 1628 House of Burgesses, then returned to England. His nephew, Richard Bennett, came out from England to develop the plantation and colony. The following year, the "County of Warascoyack" was represented by Richard Bennett, Captain Nathaniel Basse, and three others, all Puritans. This was the Puritans' strongest representation in the Anglican-dominant Virginia colony. Richard Bennett began to acquire his own lands, and ultimately owned thousands of acres in both Virginia and Maryland.

== Later years ==
Around 1628 Edward's nephew, Richard Bennett (son of Thomas) travelled to Virginia to take over management of Bennett's Welcome, as his plantation was then known. Over the next ten years, Richard Bennett patented more than 2,000 acres (8.1 km^{2}) of his own and amassed more than 7,000 acres (28 km^{2}) in Virginia and Maryland.

Edward Bennett died sometime before 3 June 1651, likely in London where he had raised his family. His widow died there by 26 May 1659 when her estate passed to her daughter Mary Bland.

His nephew Richard Bennett became Commonwealth of England Governor of Virginia, serving three years, from 1652–1655, during the republican years of Cromwell. Richard Bennett remained active in the government of Virginia even after the Restoration of the monarchy after Cromwell. He moved the Puritan colony to Nansemond, where he died in 1676. Before he died, Richard had become a Quaker and he provided generously for several prominent Quakers in his will.
