= List of historical societies in Maryland =

The following is a list of historical societies in the state of Maryland, United States.

== Organizations ==
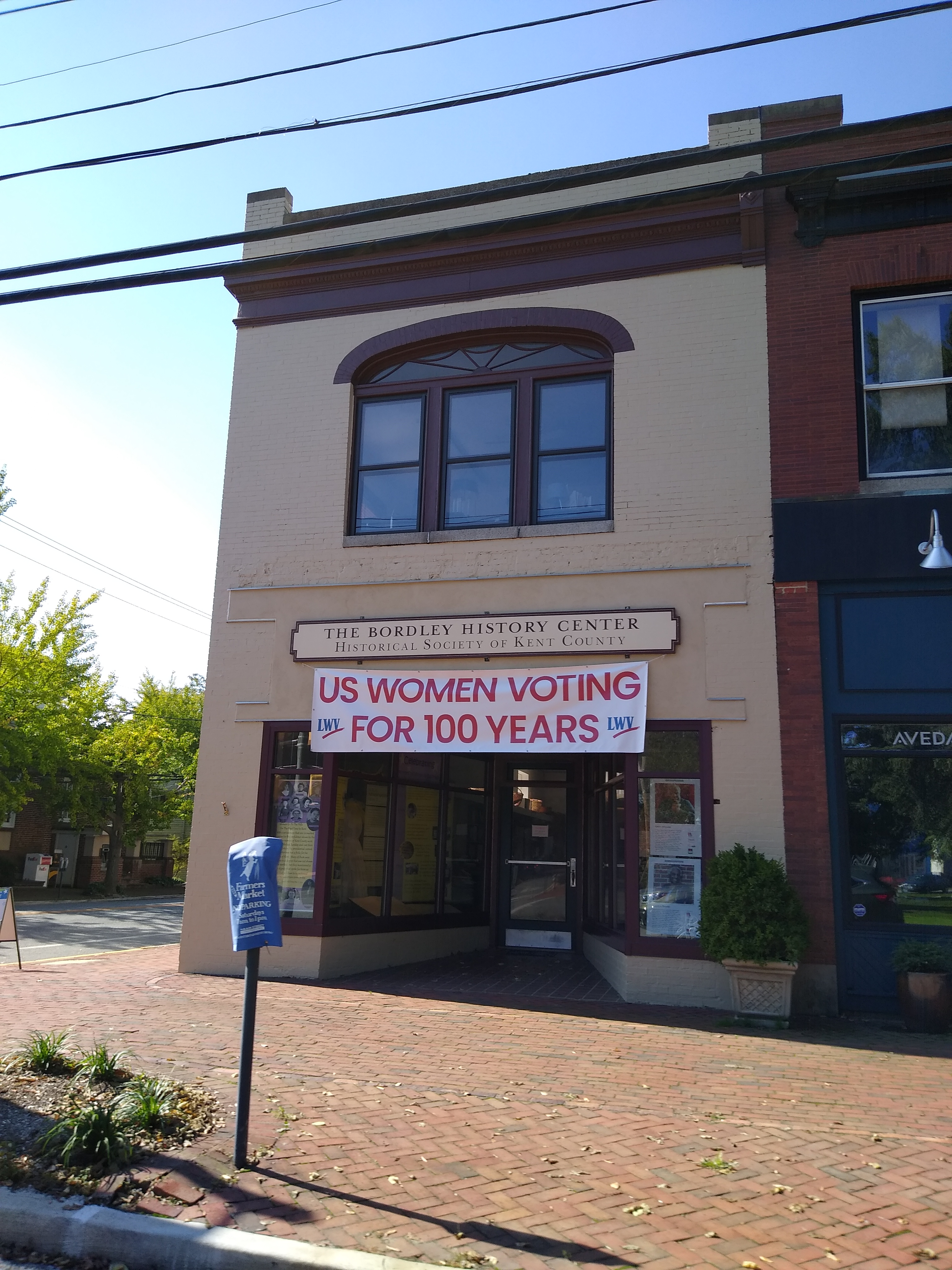
Historical Society of Kent County building in Maryland, US, in 2020

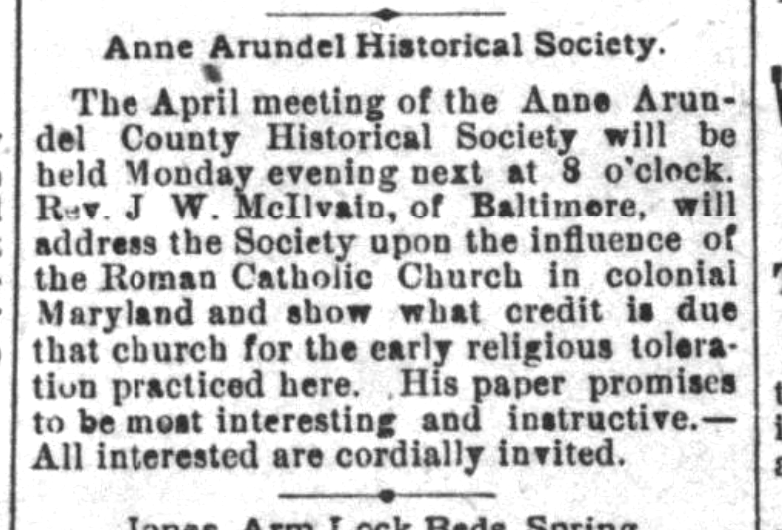
1888 newspaper item about a meeting of the Anne Arundel County Historical Society, Maryland

- Allegany County Historical Society
- Allen Historical Society
- Anne Arundel County Historical Society
- Historical Society of Baltimore County
- Bladensburg Historical Society
- Boyds Historical Society
- Calvert County Historical Society
- Caroline County Historical Society
- Historical Society of Carroll County
- Historical Society of Cecil County
- Historical Society of Charles County
- Chevy Chase Historical Society
- Clarksburg Historical Society
- Dorchester County Historical Society
- Federalsburg Historical Society
- Historical Society of Frederick County
- Garrett County Historical Society
- Greensboro Historical Society
- Harford Historical Society
- Historical Society of Harford County
- Howard County Historical Society
- Historical Society of Kent County
- Laurel Historical Society
- Maryland Historical Society
- Montgomery County Historical Society
- Prince George's Historical Society
- Queen Anne's County Historical Society
- St. Mary's County Historical Society
- Somerset County Historical Society
- Historical Society of Talbot County
- Thurmont Historical Society
- Washington County Historical Society
- Wicomico Historical Society
- Worcester County Historical Society

== See also ==
- History of Maryland
- List of museums in Maryland
- National Register of Historic Places listings in Maryland
- List of historical societies in the United States
