= Historical Society of Baltimore County =

Organization

- Logo of The Historical Society of Baltimore County
- Abbreviation: HSBC
- Formation: 1959
- Type: Historical Society, Museum
- Legal status: 501(c)(3) Non-Profit Organization
- Purpose: Historical Preservation, Education
- Location: 9811 Van Buren Lane, Cockeysville, Maryland 21030
- Coordinates: 39.4601°N 76.6278°W
- Executive Director: James G. Keffer
- President, Board of Directors: Scott Batton
- Vice-President, Board of Directors: Tom Graf
- C.P.A., Treasurer: H. David Delluomo
- Website: www.hsobc.org

The Historical Society of Baltimore County (HSBC) was founded in 1959 with the goal of preserving, interpreting, and illustrating the history of Baltimore County for the benefit of present and future generations of Marylanders, and is a resource for those interested in researching both local and family history. As the HSBC describes it, they "continually accomplish" their mission "through the production of presentations, lectures, workshops, entertaining educational publications, historical tours, and exhibits." Centrally located in Cockeysville, Maryland, the Society operates out of the Agriculture Building, the former Baltimore County Almshouse, which was built in 1872 and used to house the poor and mentally ill of Baltimore County until 1958.

A nonprofit organization, the Society maintains a library and research facility. Since 1966, the Society has published History Trails, a county history journal which the Society defines as "semi-academic" and a "popular history publication."

From 2014 to 2018, HSBC received an annual $12,000 operating grant from the Baltimore County Executive and Baltimore County Council, which are awarded to "organizations whose programs demonstrate significant impact on the quality of life of Baltimore County residents." In 2018, an African American Heritage Preservation Program Grant workshop, for the Maryland Historical Trust, was held at the HSBC. It also partners with other museum organizations for programming.

== The Almshouse Farm Site ==
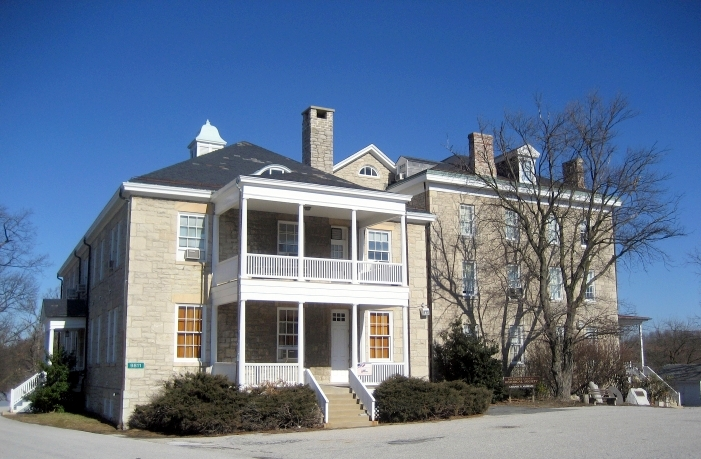
The Almshouse circa 2008

Located on Baltimore’s County Home Property, the Historical Society’s campus comprises several buildings of various ages and states of repair. Chief of these is the Almshouse which houses the offices and library. Other buildings are the Pest house, Smokehouse, and Barn.

=== The Almshouse ===
Constructed of local limestone in 1872, the Almshouse was damaged by a fire in 1919 after which it was rebuilt. The building has been used in several different capacities since 1958 when modern methods of caring for the indigent dictated its closing as a poorhouse. The Historical Society and various county agencies have been located in the Almshouse since 1959. During the Cold War, the Almshouse was used as a fallout shelter; emergency supplies from that era still reside in the basement. The Almshouse was designated a Baltimore County Landmark in 1980.

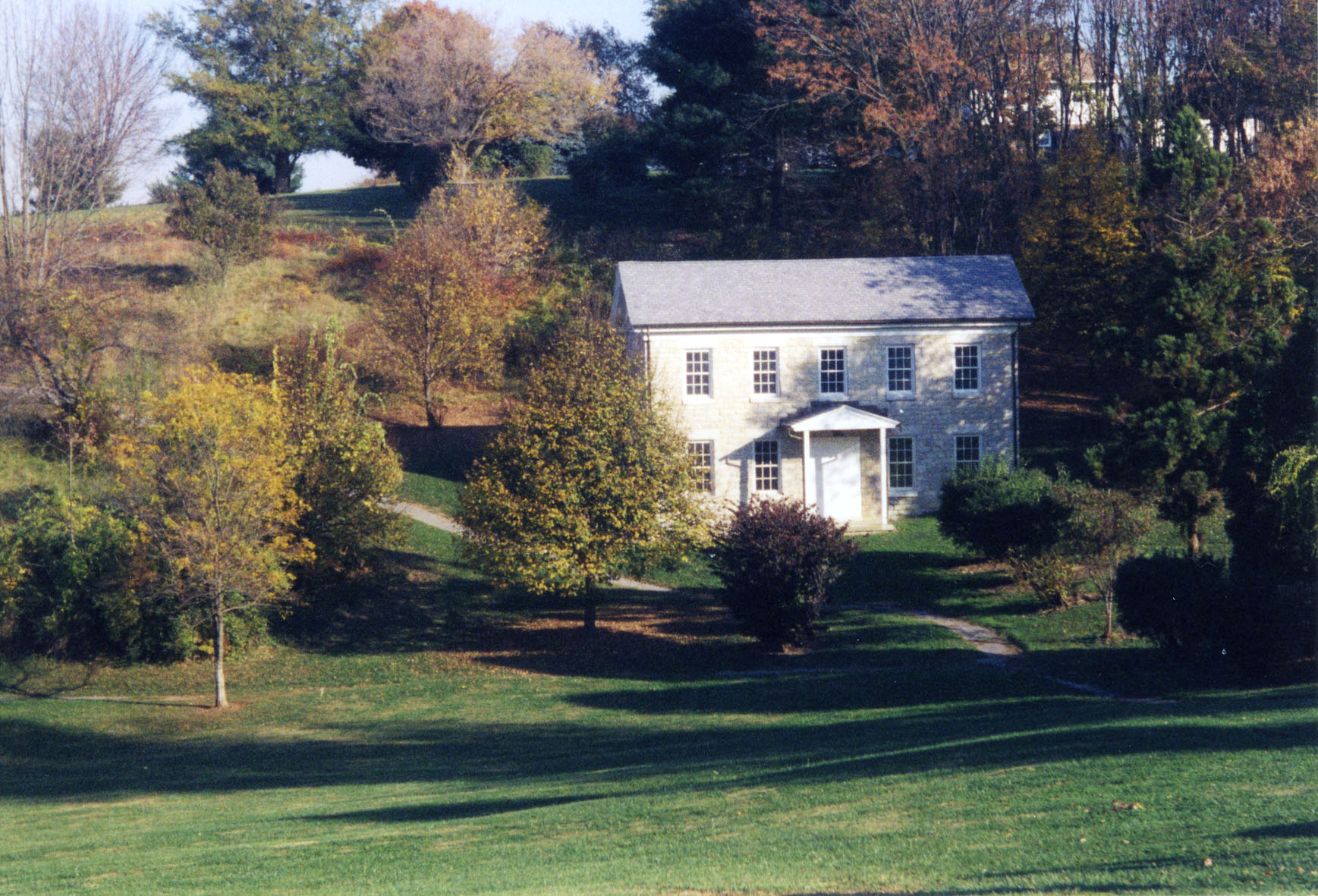
The Pest House in 2003

=== The Pest House ===
The Pest House (referring to pestilence) was used to isolate residents who were ill. The two-story building with a slate roof was built shortly after the Almshouse. The exterior is in reasonable condition, but the interior suffers from decades of non-use and vandalism. In 2012, Preservation Maryland placed the Pest House on its list of threatened historic properties. The same year, the Baltimore Sun reported that the 1872 Cockeysville building, "built to house poor people who had communicable diseases" was a "boarded-up structure" but Preservation Maryland was the subject an effort to "preserve it as a center for county African-American history."

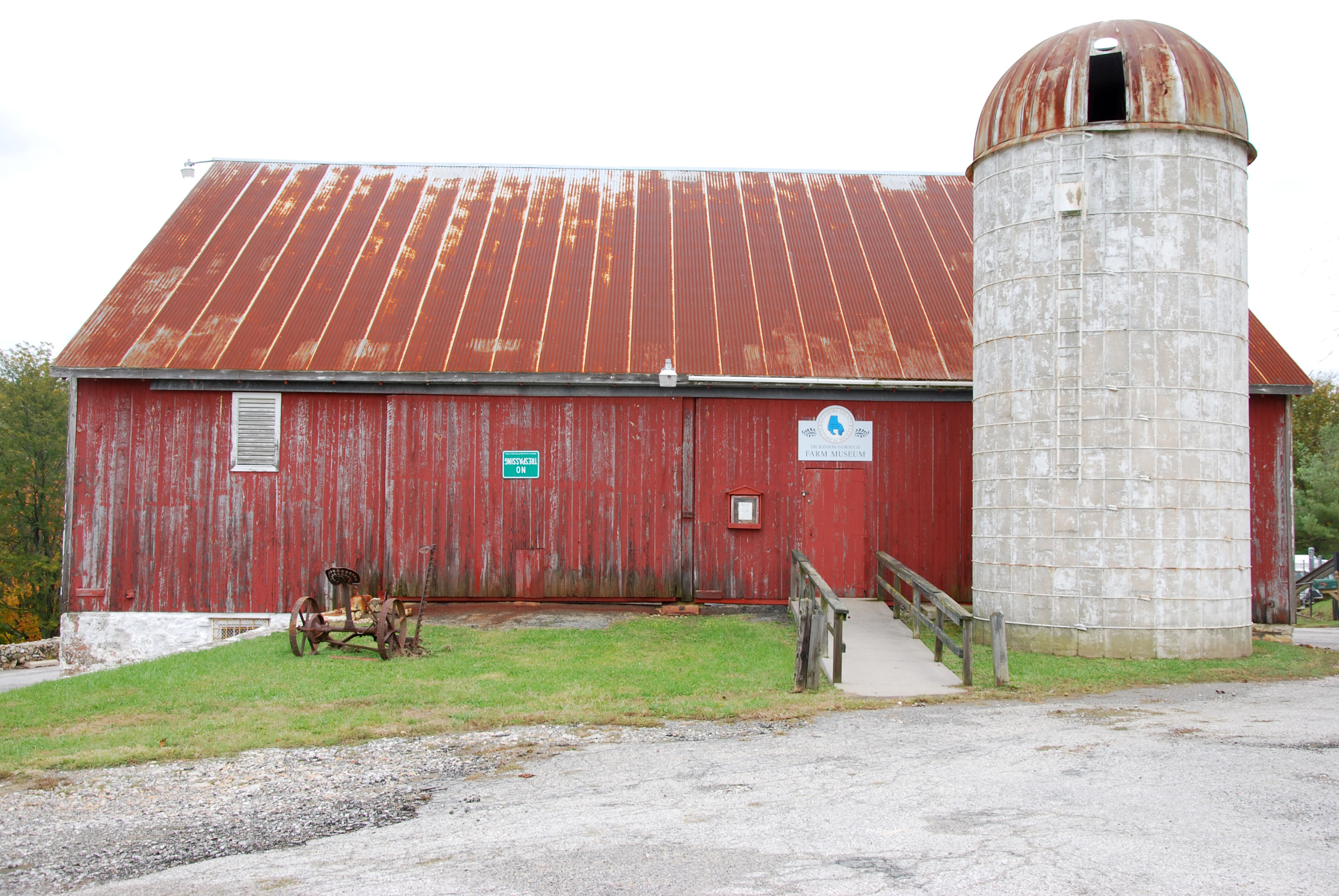
The barn housing the Dickenson-Gorsuch Farm Museum

=== The Barn ===
The Barn is a modern structure, built on the foundation of a 19th-century barn destroyed by fire in the 1970s. It now house a farm museum, named in honor of Baltimore County Veterinarian Dickinson Gorsuch (1878-1970) whose bequest enabled the establishment of the museum in 1993 .

== Collections ==
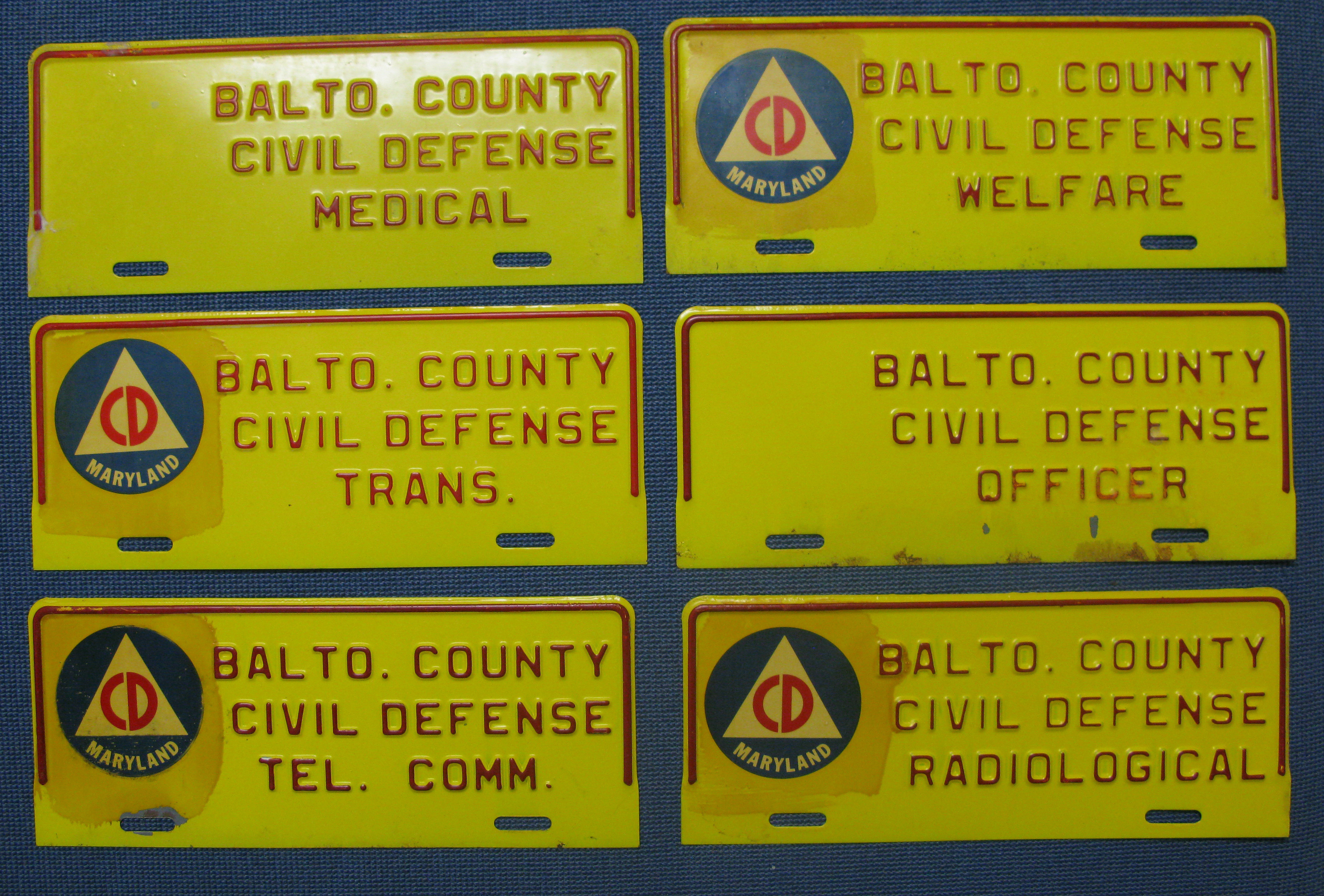
Civil Defense automobile tags circa 1962

=== Artifacts ===
Objects from the museum collection of over 10,000 items, some of which are not on general display but can sometimes be seen in special exhibitions. There are also hundreds of archival collections.

=== Maps ===
The Society has a collection of over 500 maps and atlases.

=== Library ===
The Society's library contains 4,000 volumes.

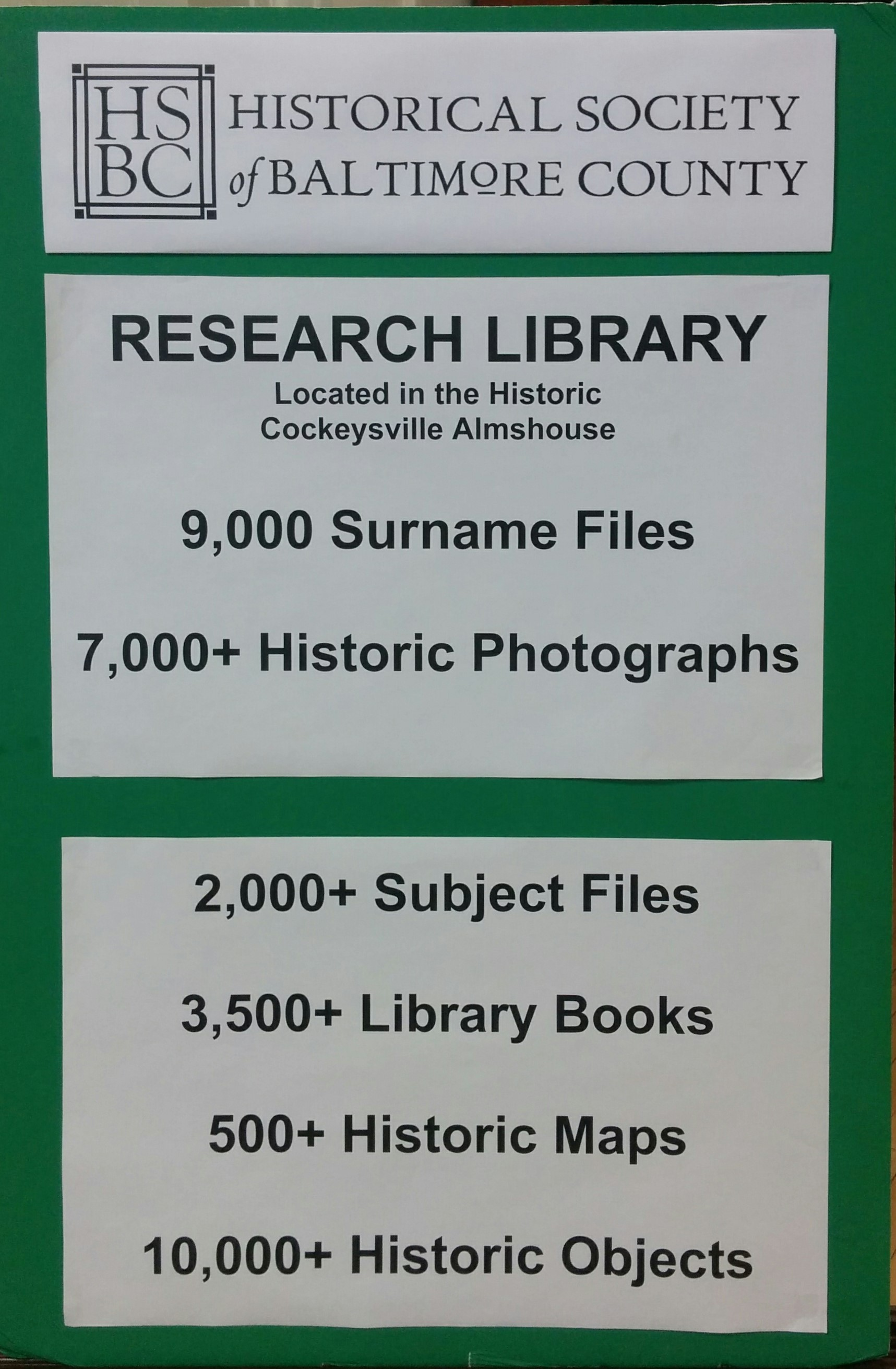
Resources available at the HSBC Research Library

=== Photographs ===
More than 8,000 historic photographs reside in the Society's files.

=== Genealogy ===
The Society maintains 9,000 surname files, most of which can be found on-site, which often contain only one spelling of the surname. Also, for genealogists, maps which show the names of landowners and where they homes are located are available. Additionally, on the first Thursday of each month, the HSBC has free Genealogy classes and there are some inscriptions of gravestones.

=== Online database ===
Part of the 33,000 records are available in a searchable database which has a "Keyword Search", "Advanced Search" and "Random Images button" along with other catalog searches.

=== Other resources ===
The society's over 1900 vertical files on varied topics, library holdings, and photograph collection, are indexed online. Those who visit the society have to pay an entrance fee of $5.00 per visit for those who are non-members, with photocopies being 25 cents a page and a $5.00 fee for capturing images using a digital device or phone.

=== Activities ===
The HSBC has been a recipient of an award, in 2014, from the Costume Society of America and hosting, in 2009, the friends of Friends of Texas, Maryland. They also held joint events with the Baltimore City Historical Society on [police history and Baltimore's water history. Apart from this, its volunteers have researched a "progressive little town called Warren" submerged under the "waters of Loch Raven Reservoir" and doing genealogical talks.

== See also ==
- List of historical societies in Maryland
