= Warrosquyoake Shire =

Historic county in the Virginia Colony

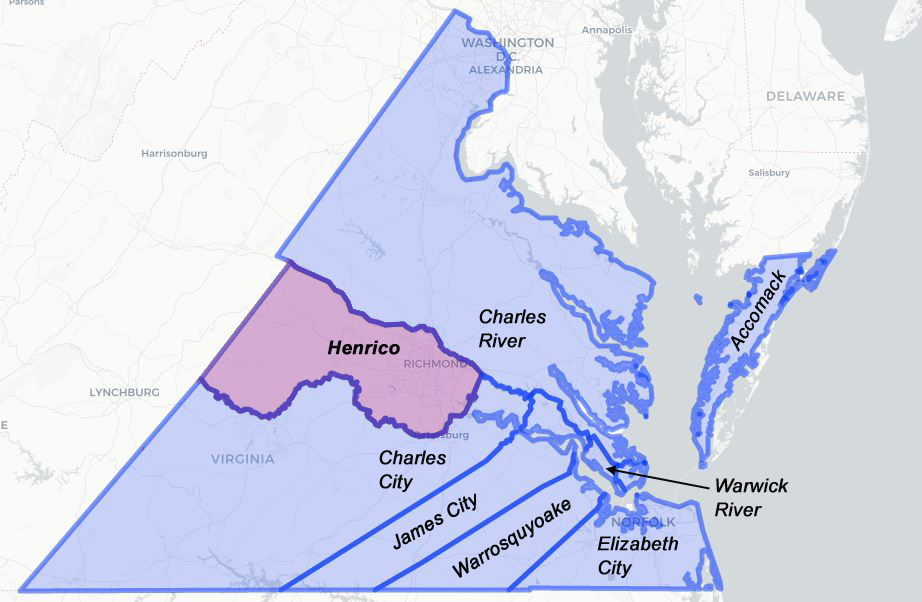
Map of the shires of Virginia, 1634

Warrosquoake Shire (with numerous variant spellings, including Warrascoyack, Warrascocke and "Warwick Squeak") was officially formed in 1634 in the Virginia colony, but had already been known as "Warascoyack County" before this. It was named for an Algonquian-speaking tribe that was part of the Powhatan Confederacy. The county was renamed Isle of Wight County in 1637, after an island in the English Channel.

== History ==
Shortly after the establishment of Jamestown in 1607, English settlers explored and began settling areas adjacent to Hampton Roads. The shoreline region of the Warrascoyack River was occupied by the Warraskoyak tribe of the Powhatan Confederacy, under their weroance, Tackinekintaco. In December 1608, Captain John Smith left his page Samuel Collier with Tackinekintaco to learn the language.

The main Warraskoyak village was located where present-day Smithfield, Virginia developed. A satellite village called Mokete was at Pagan Point, and another called Mathomank was on Burwell's Bay, led by a sub-weroance named Sasenticum.

The first English plantation in the region, dating to 1618, was that of Puritan merchant Christopher Lawne. Several other Puritans also settled nearby. Edward Bennett, an English merchant and a free member of the London Company, was among those who got a land patent and founded his plantation in 1621. He named his plantation Warrosquoake, after the river which the indigenous people called by that name. His plantation suffered high fatalities of colonists in the Great Massacre of 1622, losing 53 persons. A total of the 347 colonists were killed that day, as the Powhatan tribes tried to kill and expel the English.

The surviving English retreated to a small number of plantations near Jamestown until an expedition was mounted against the Warraskoyak and Nansemond peoples. The colony built a fort nearby Bennett's plantation. In reprisals during the following years, they drove off the Native Americans from their villages. A census of settlers at Bennett's plantation on 16 February 1623 showed a total of "33, including 4 negroes", with 20 settlers recorded at nearby Basse's Choice. A year later, a census showed a total population of 31 settlers for the region.

Two of Bennett's brothers had managed his plantation and died in the colony, in 1624 and 126. Edward Bennett finally went to Virginia himself for a time, representing his plantation in the 1628 House of Burgesses, then returned to England.

His nephew Richard Bennett came out to manage the plantation, and stayed in the colony. He became a large landowner and eventually governor of the colony. In 1629, the "County of Warascoyack" was represented in the House of Burgeses was represented by Richard Bennett, Captain Nathaniel Basse (who owned Basse's Choice), Thomas Jordan and two others, all Puritans. This was the Puritans' strongest representation in a colony dominated by members of the Anglican Church.

By 1634, by order of the King of England, Charles I, eight shires of Virginia were formed, with a total population of 4,914 settlers. Warrosquoake Shire included 522 persons at the time. It and Accomac Shire were the only shires given Native-American names, honoring the friendly tribes nearby. In 1637 the English renamed it Isle of Wight County, after an island of the same name in the English channel between England and France. They also renamed the Warrosquoake river the Pagan River.

During the three years when it was officially Warrosquoake Shire, Richard Bennett led the small Puritan community to neighboring Nansemond. They later moved to Maryland when under religious pressure in Virginia. He returned during the Cromwellian period with a Parliamentary Commission to take over from the Royalist government and served as Governor of Virginia.

As population increased, land was drawn from Warrosquoake Shire and Isle of Wight County to form many other counties to the immediate southwest, in the region now defined as Southside Virginia. The counties of Isle of Wight, Southampton, Greensville and Brunswick were all created within the limits of what had been Warrosquoake Shire.

== See also ==
- Weyanoke people
