= Maude R. Toulson Federal Building =

- United States Post Office
- U.S. National Register of Historic Places
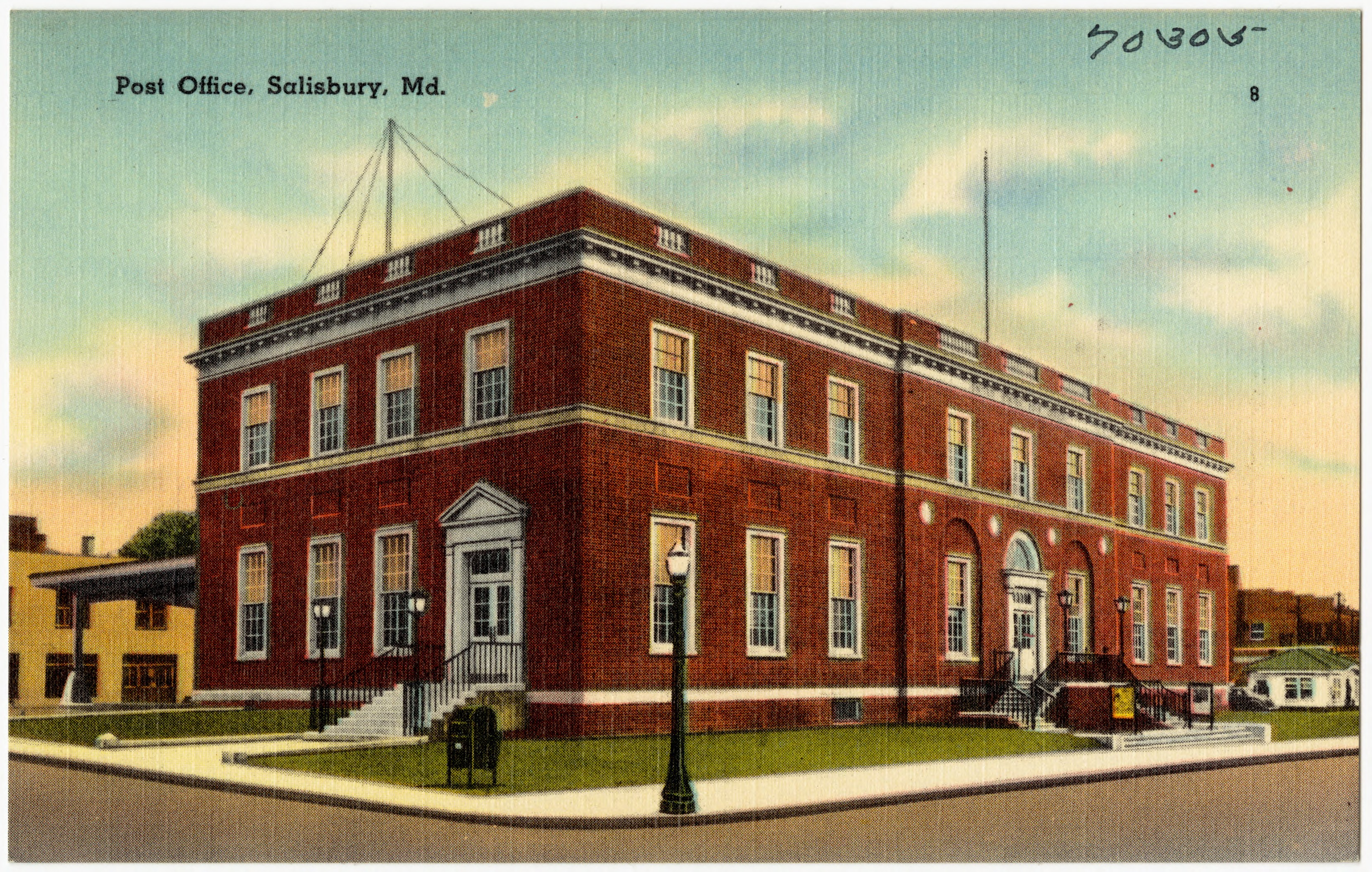
- Postcard view, c. 1930-45

- Location within Maryland Location within the United States
- Location: 129 E. Main St., Salisbury, Maryland
- Coordinates: 38°21′55″N 75°35′59″W
- Built: 1924
- Architect: Office of the Supervising Architect under James A. Wetmore
- Architectural style: Classical Revival
- NRHP reference No.: 16000199
- Added to NRHP: April 26, 2016

The Maude R. Toulson Federal Building is a historic federal government building in Salisbury, Maryland. It is a large two-story brick building with Classical Revival styling. It has a nine-bay front facade, the center three projecting slightly, and is topped by a low balustrade punctuated by brick piers. The center bays have recessed arches, with windows in the outer of those bays flanking a center entrance. It was built in 1924–25 as a five bay building, with an enlargement in 1934–35; the original design was by the Office of the Supervising Architect under James A. Wetmore. The building initially housed the United States Post Office, and now houses other federal facilities, including the United States District Court for the District of Maryland.

Public Law 98-296 officially designated the building as the "Maude R. Toulson Federal Building" in May 1984.The building was listed on the National Register of Historic Places in 2016.

== See also ==
- National Register of Historic Places listings in Wicomico County, Maryland
