= National Register of Historic Places listings in Maryland =

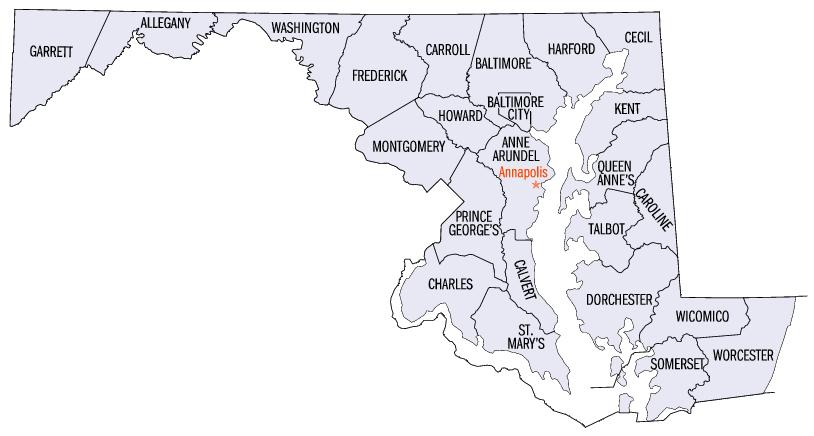
Maryland counties

There are more than 1,500 properties and districts listed on the National Register of Historic Places in the U.S. state of Maryland. Each of the state's 23 counties and its one county-equivalent (the independent city of Baltimore) has at least 20 listings on the National Register.

This National Park Service list is complete through NPS recent listings posted September 25, 2026.

== Current listings by county ==
The following are approximate tallies of current listings in Maryland on the National Register of Historic Places. These counts are based on entries in the National Register Information Database as of April 24, 2008 and new weekly listings posted since then on the National Register of Historic Places web site. There are frequent additions to the listings and occasional delistings, and the counts here are not official. Also, the counts in this table exclude boundary increase and decrease listings which modify the area covered by an existing property or district and which carry a separate National Register reference number.

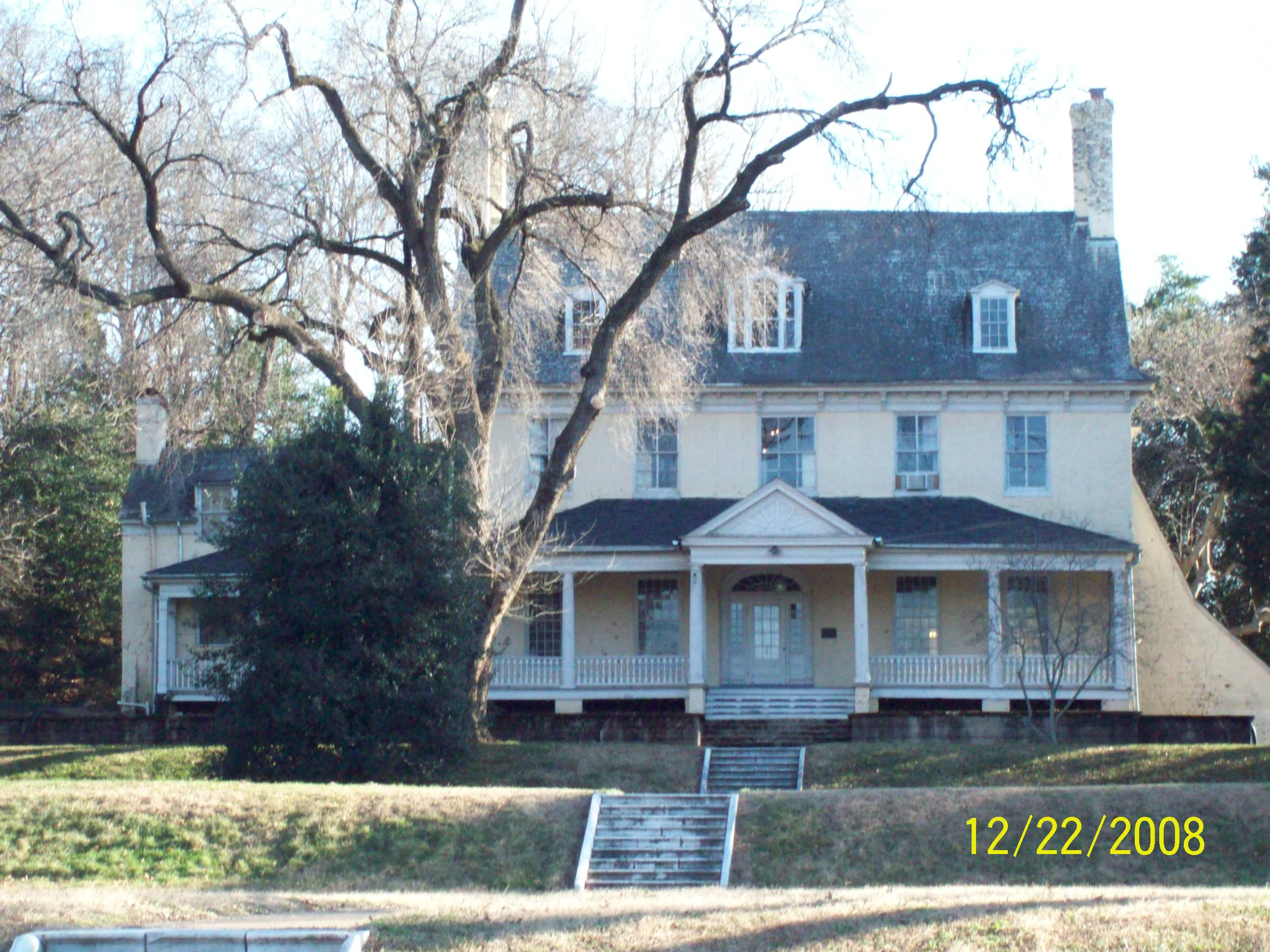
Bostwick, Prince George's County

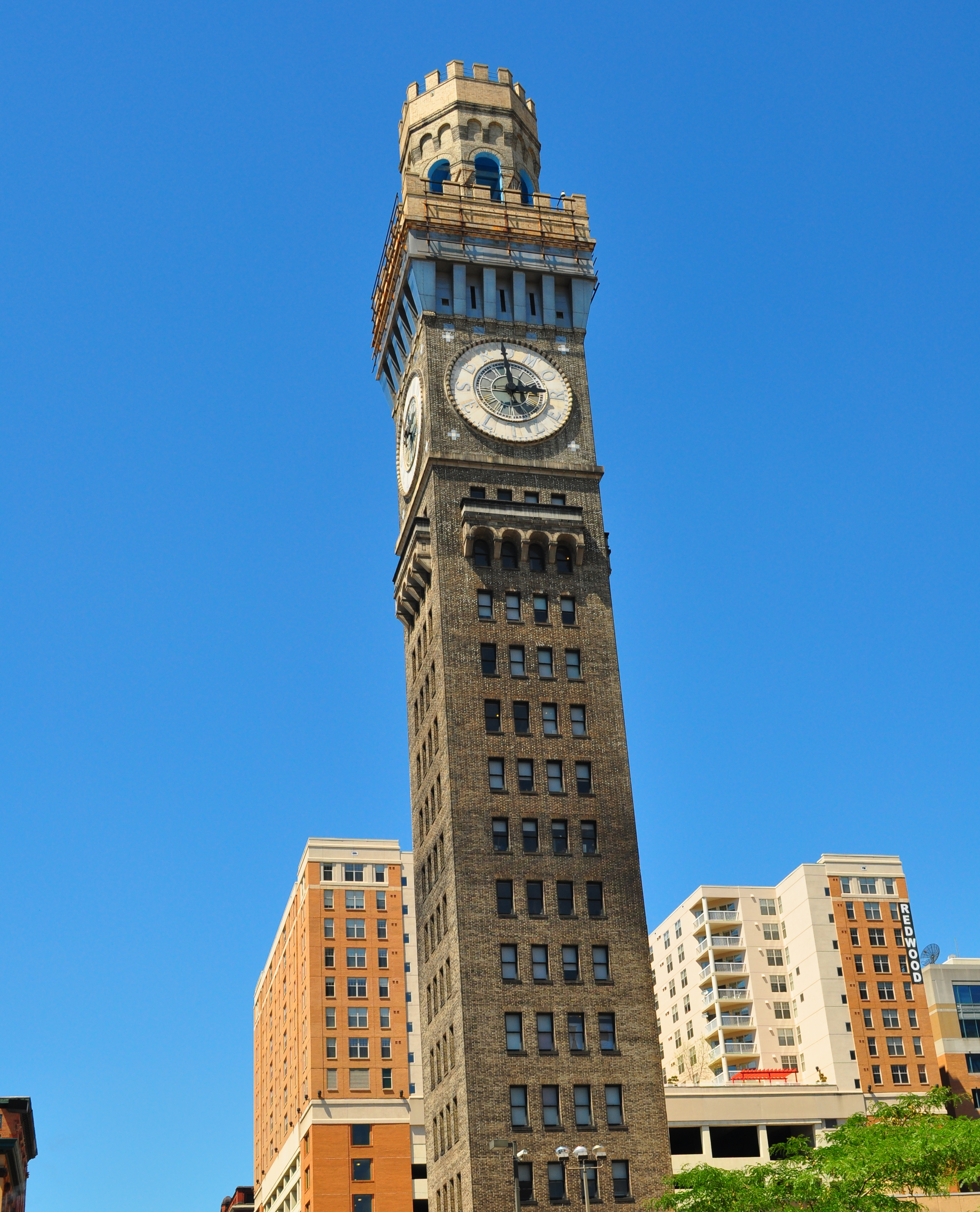
Emerson Bromo-Seltzer Tower, Baltimore City

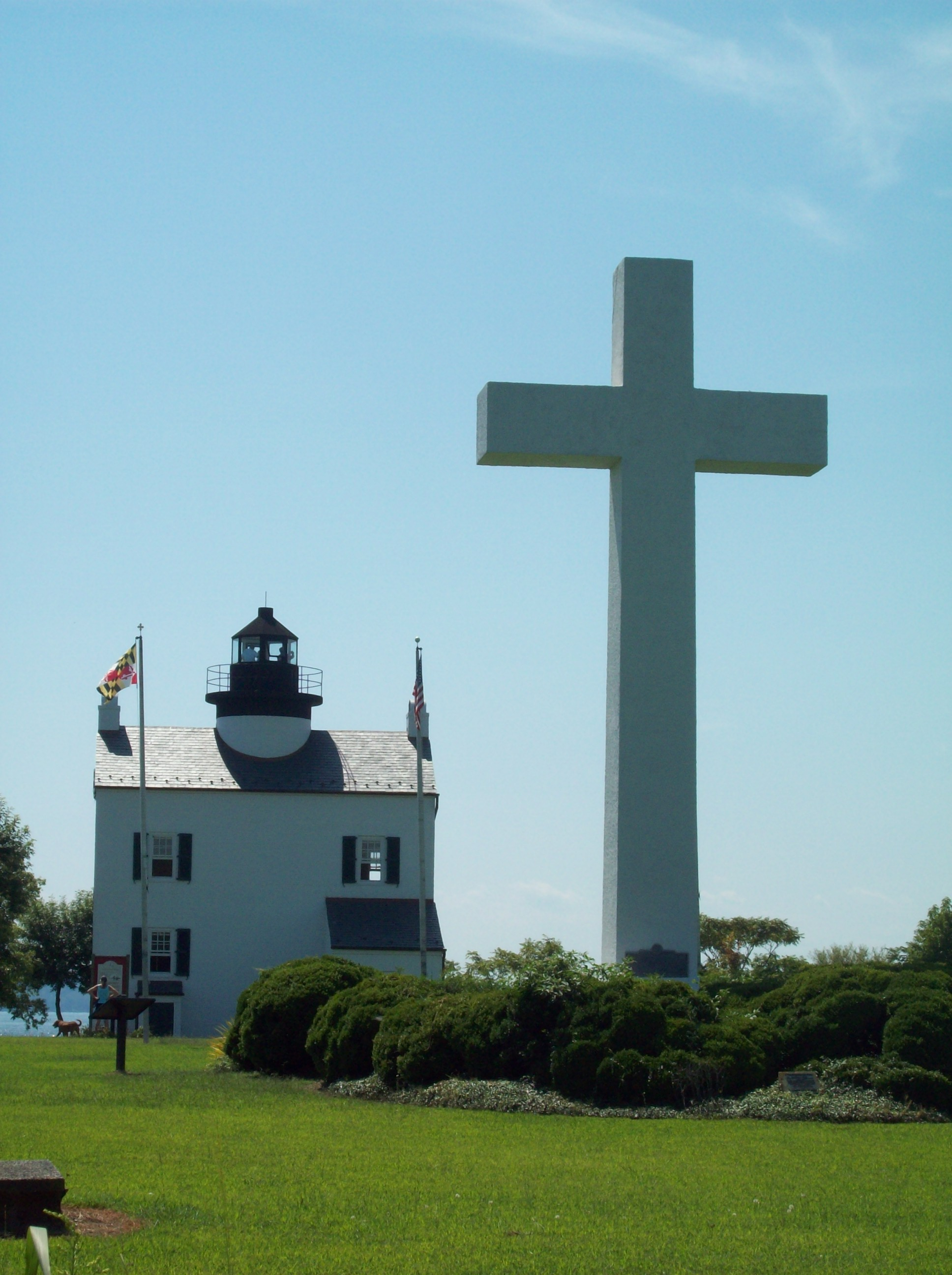
St. Clement's Island Historic District, St. Mary's County

	County	# of sites
1	Allegany	46
2	Anne Arundel	110
3	Baltimore (city)	316
4	Baltimore County	94
5	Calvert	20
6	Caroline	24
7	Carroll	62
8	Cecil	54
9	Charles	43
10	Dorchester	30
11	Frederick	104
12	Garrett	20
13	Harford	80
14	Howard	46
15	Kent	44
16	Montgomery	83
17	Prince George's	111
18	Queen Anne's	41
19	Somerset	73
20	St. Mary's	32
21	Talbot	4
22	Washington	104
23	Wicomico	26
24	Worcester	36
(duplicates)		(29)
Total:		1,633

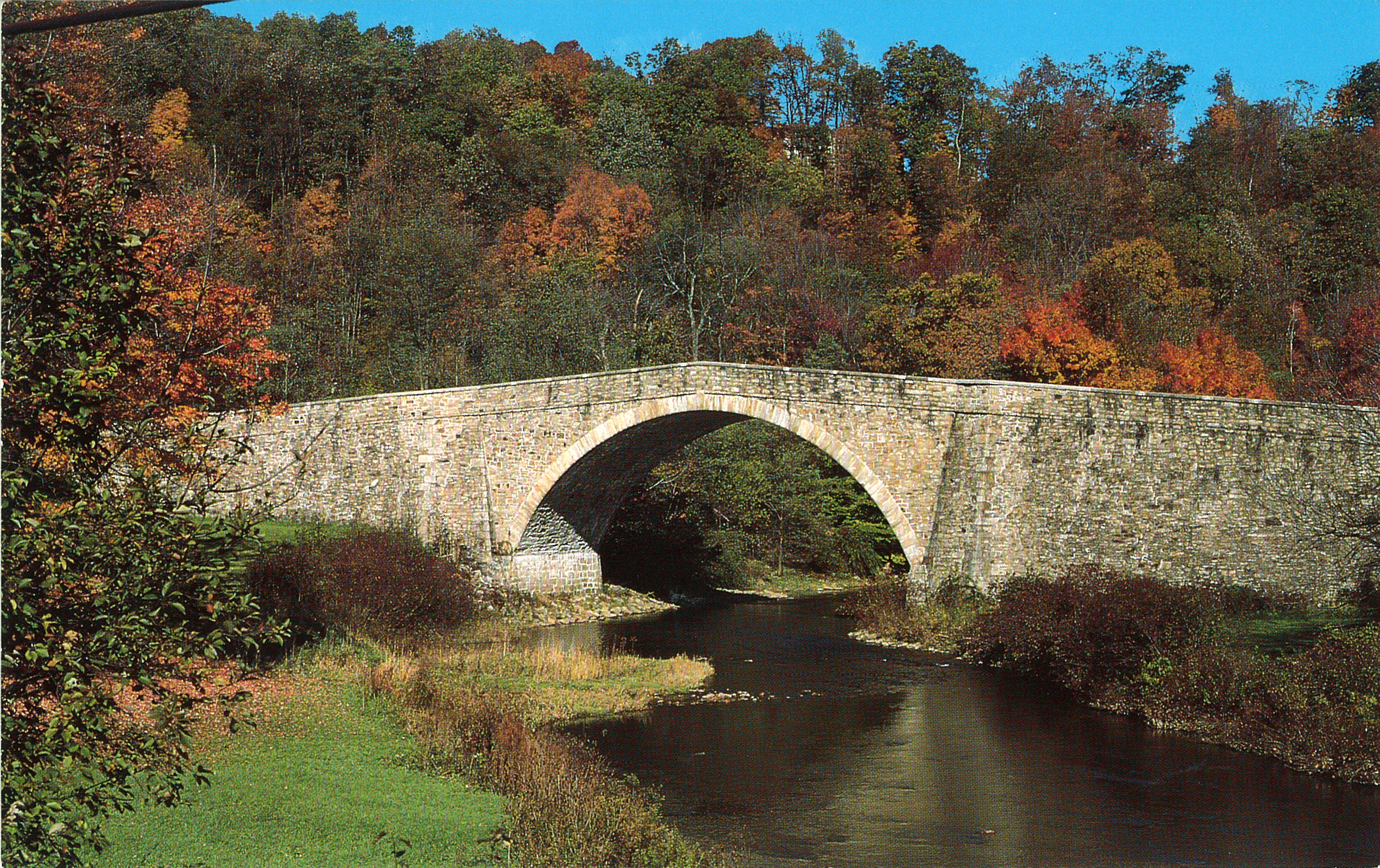
Casselman's Bridge, National Road, Garrett County

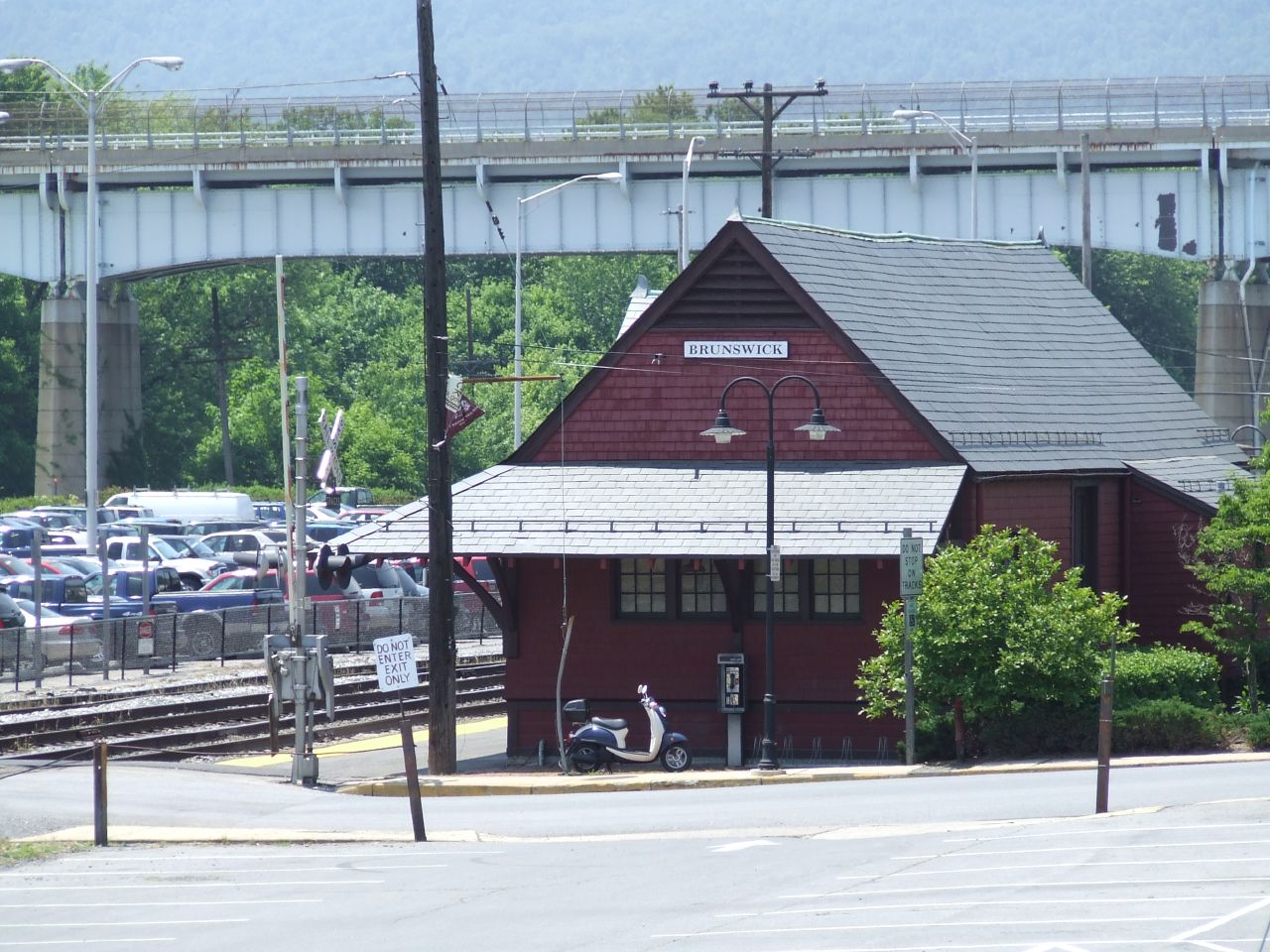
Brunswick Historic District, Frederick County

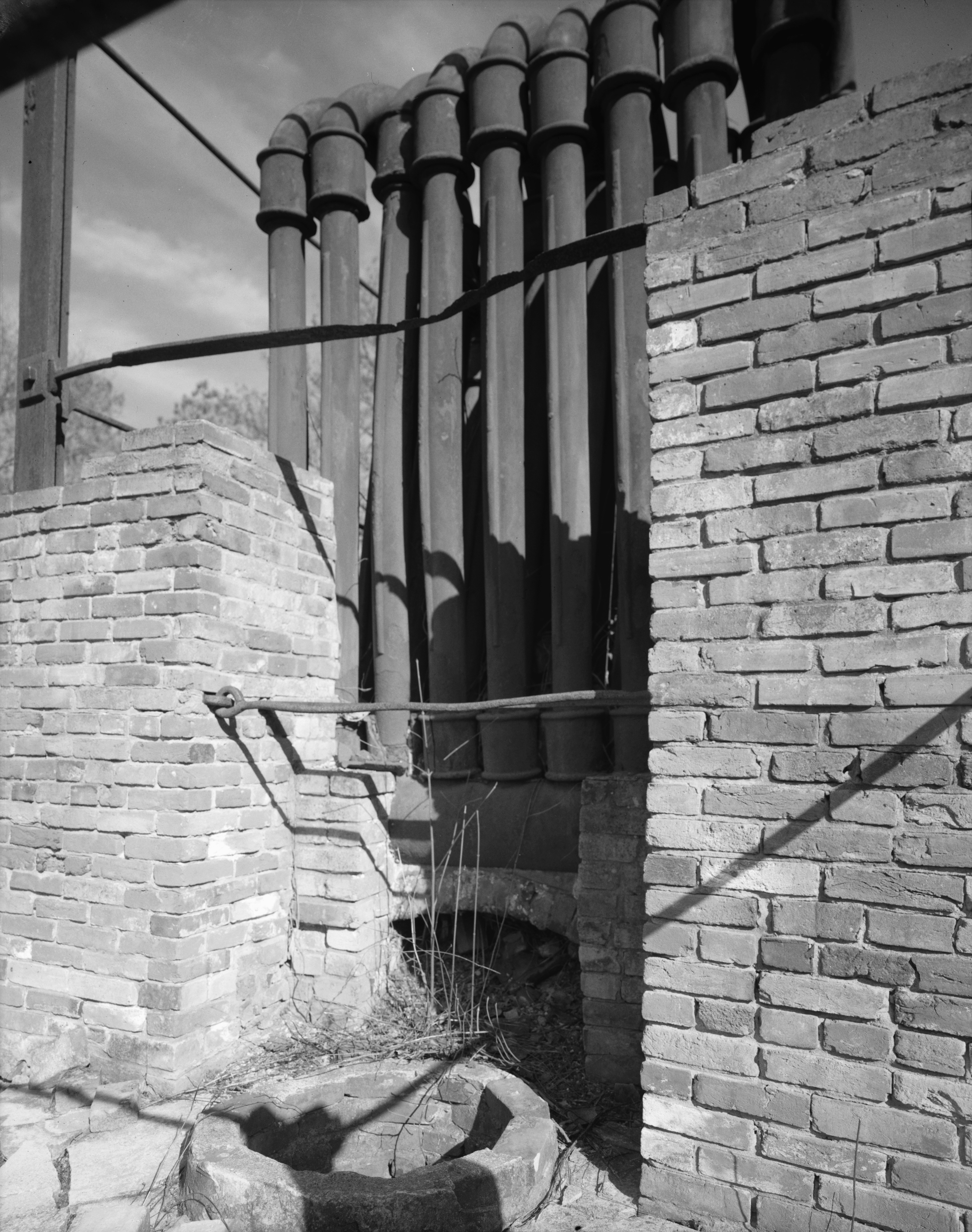
Nassawango Iron Furnace Site, Worcester County

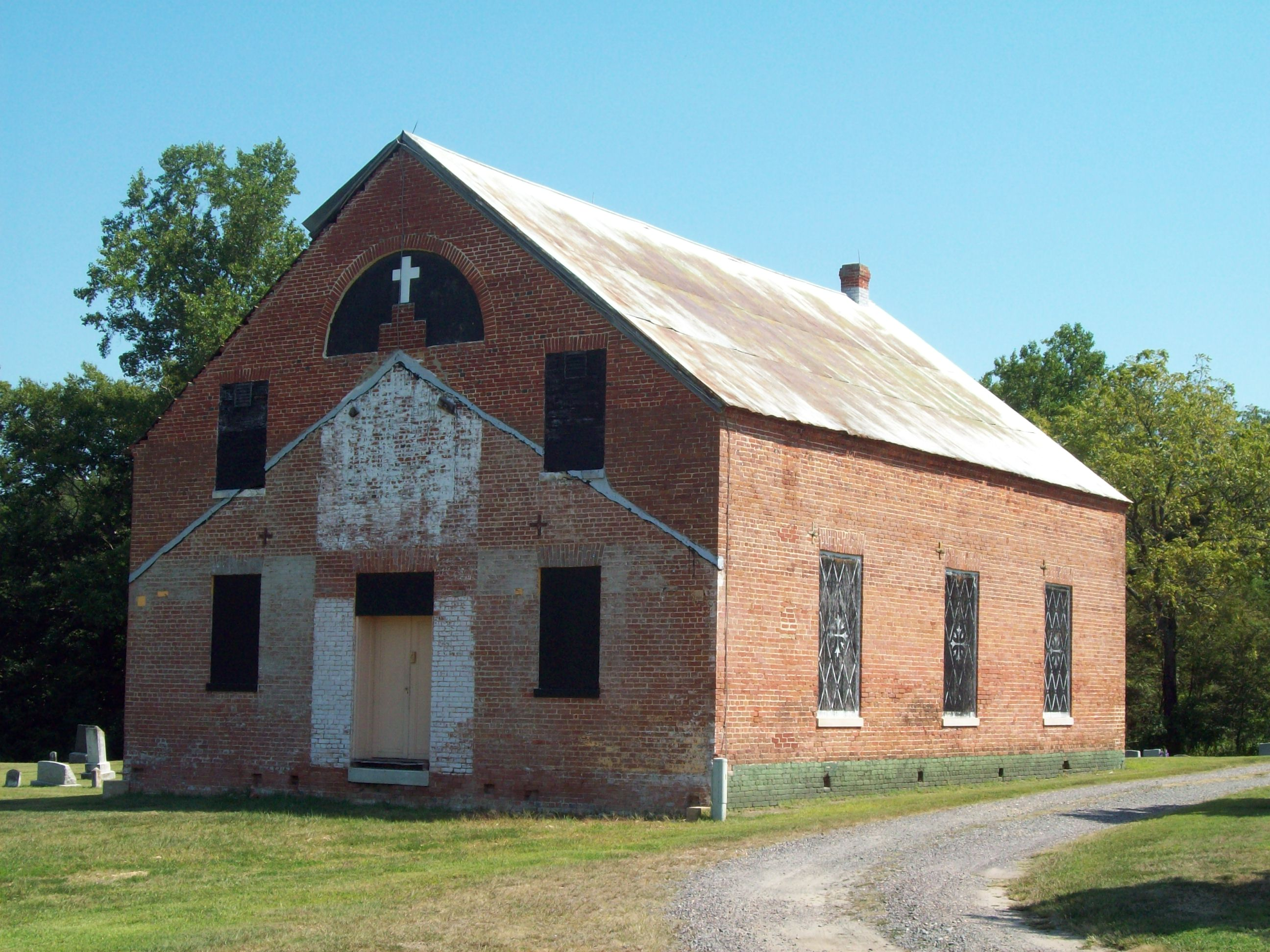
St. Mary's Roman Catholic Church, Newport, Charles County

== See also ==
- List of National Historic Landmarks in Maryland
- List of bridges on the National Register of Historic Places in Maryland
- List of historical societies in Maryland
