= Honeysuckle Lodge =

Historic house in Maryland, United States

- U.S. National Register of Historic Places
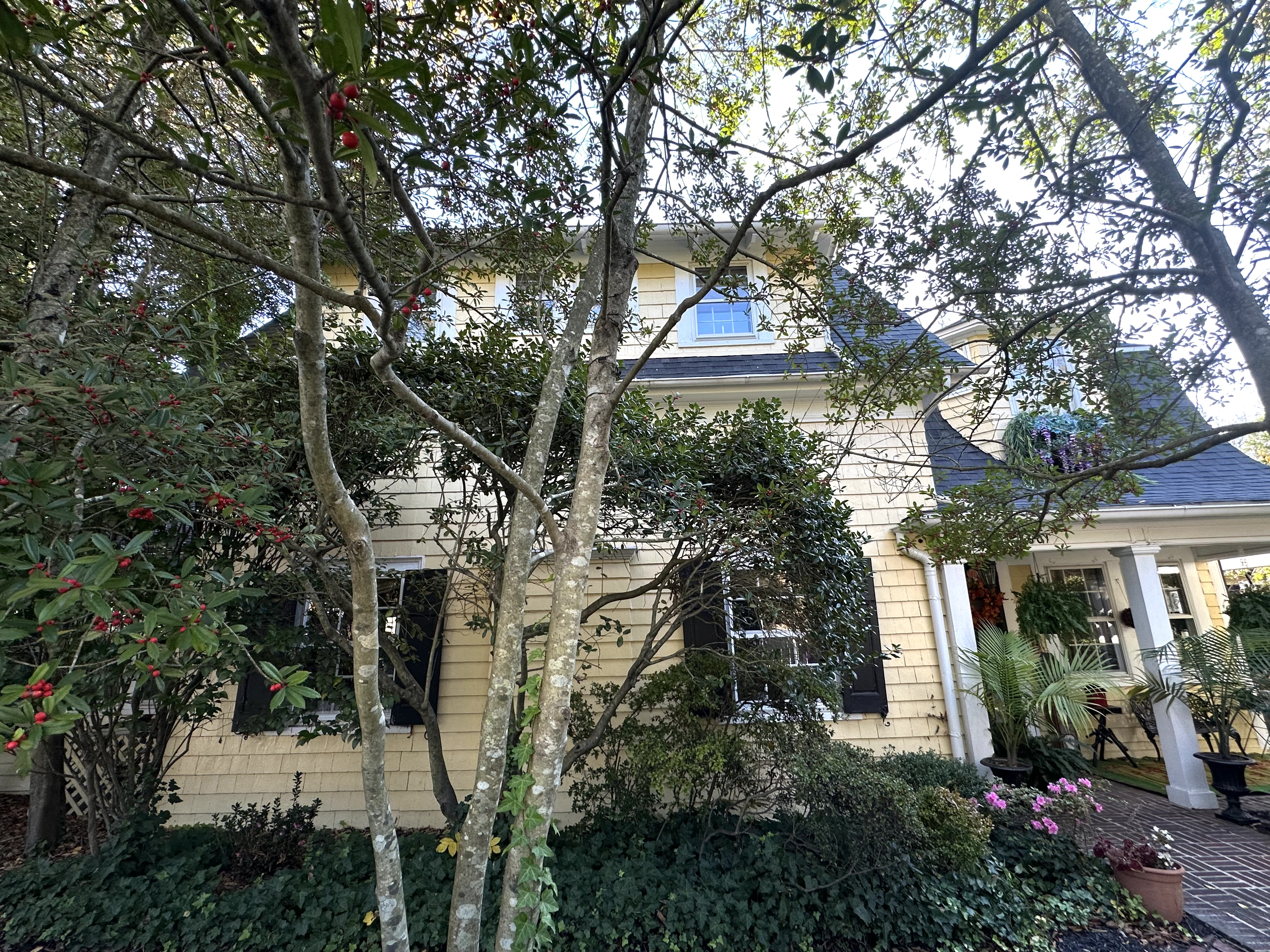
- Honeysuckle Lodge in 2025

- Location within Maryland Location within the United States
- Location: 1601 Camden Ave. Salisbury, Maryland
- Coordinates: 38°20′6″N 75°36′53″W
- Area: 1 acre (0.40 ha)
- Built: 1906
- Architectural style: Colonial Revival
- NRHP reference No.: 96000880
- Added to NRHP: August 8, 1996

Honeysuckle Lodge is a historic home located at Salisbury, Wicomico County, Maryland, United States. It is a 1 1/2-story eclectic frame dwelling built in stages during the first half of the 20th century. The home has a Colonial Revival style. Also on the property is a 1-story, frame guest house built around 1940. The asbestos-shingled frame structure is supported by a continuous brick foundation, and the medium-sloped gable roof is covered with asphalt shingles. The yard is planted with mature trees and shrubs.

Honeysuckle Lodge was listed on the National Register of Historic Places in 1996.
