= Allen, Maryland =

Allen
- Census-designated place
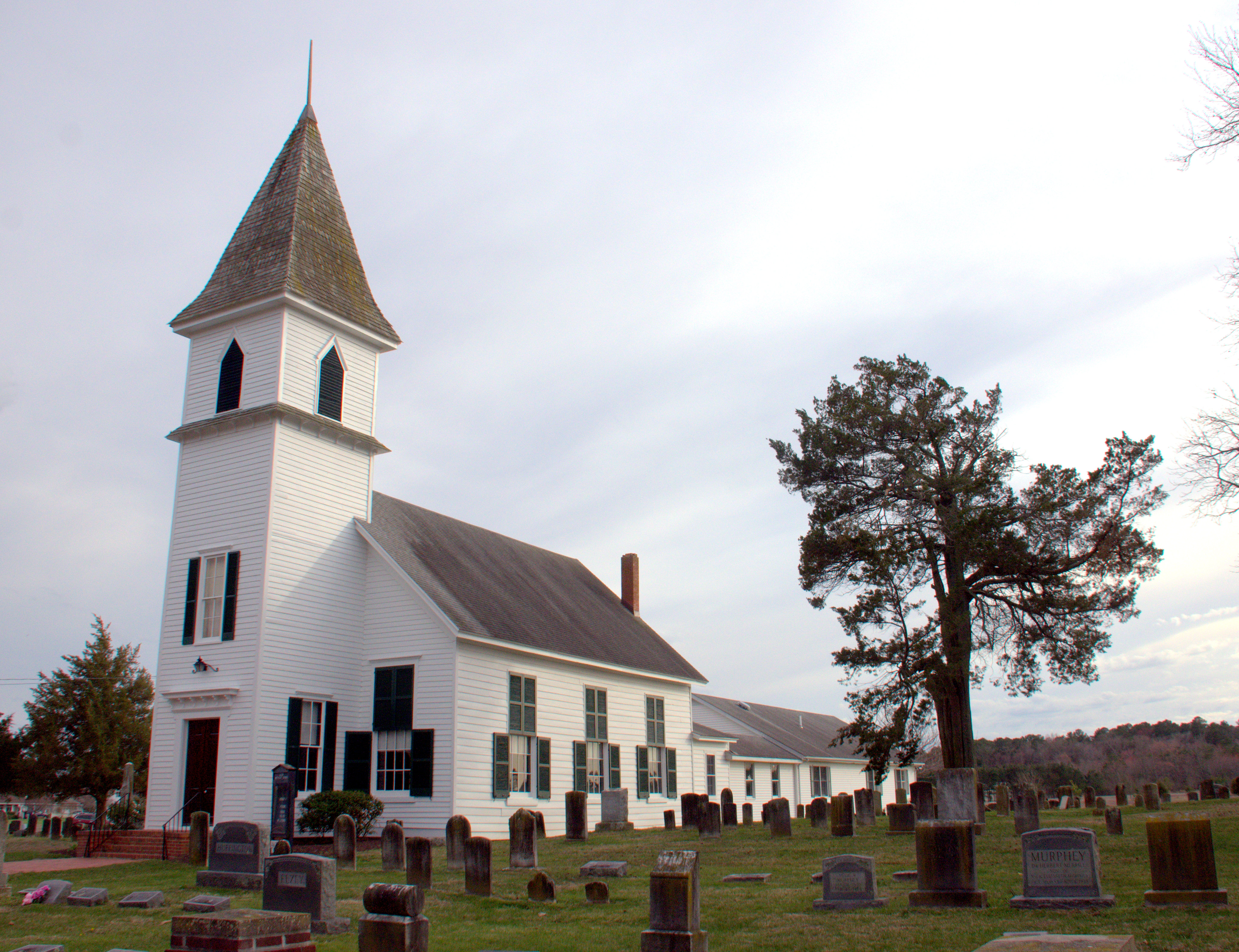
- Asbury United Methodist Church and Cemetery

- Location within the state of Maryland Allen (the United States)
- Coordinates: 38°17′14″N 75°41′17″W
- Country: United States
- State: Maryland
- County: Wicomico

Area
  - Total: 0.44 sq mi (1.14 km^{2})
  - Land: 0.43 sq mi (1.12 km^{2})
  - Water: 0.0039 sq mi (0.01 km^{2})
- Elevation: 10 ft (3.0 m)

Population (2020)
  - Total: 199
  - Density: 459.1/sq mi (177.25/km^{2})
- Time zone: UTC−5 (Eastern (EST))
  - Summer (DST): UTC−4 (EDT)
- ZIP code: 21810
- Area codes: 410 & 443
- FIPS code: 24-00800
- GNIS feature ID: 589634

Allen is an unincorporated community and census-designated place in Wicomico County, Maryland, United States. Its population was 210 as of the 2010 census. It is part of the Salisbury, Maryland-Delaware Metropolitan Statistical Area.

The Asbury Methodist Episcopal Church, Bennett's Adventure, and Bounds Lott are listed on the National Register of Historic Places.

== Demographics ==
Historical population
Census	Pop.	Note	%±
2020	199		—
U.S. Decennial Census
