= Long Hill (Wetipquin, Maryland) =

Historic house in Maryland, United States

- U.S. National Register of Historic Places
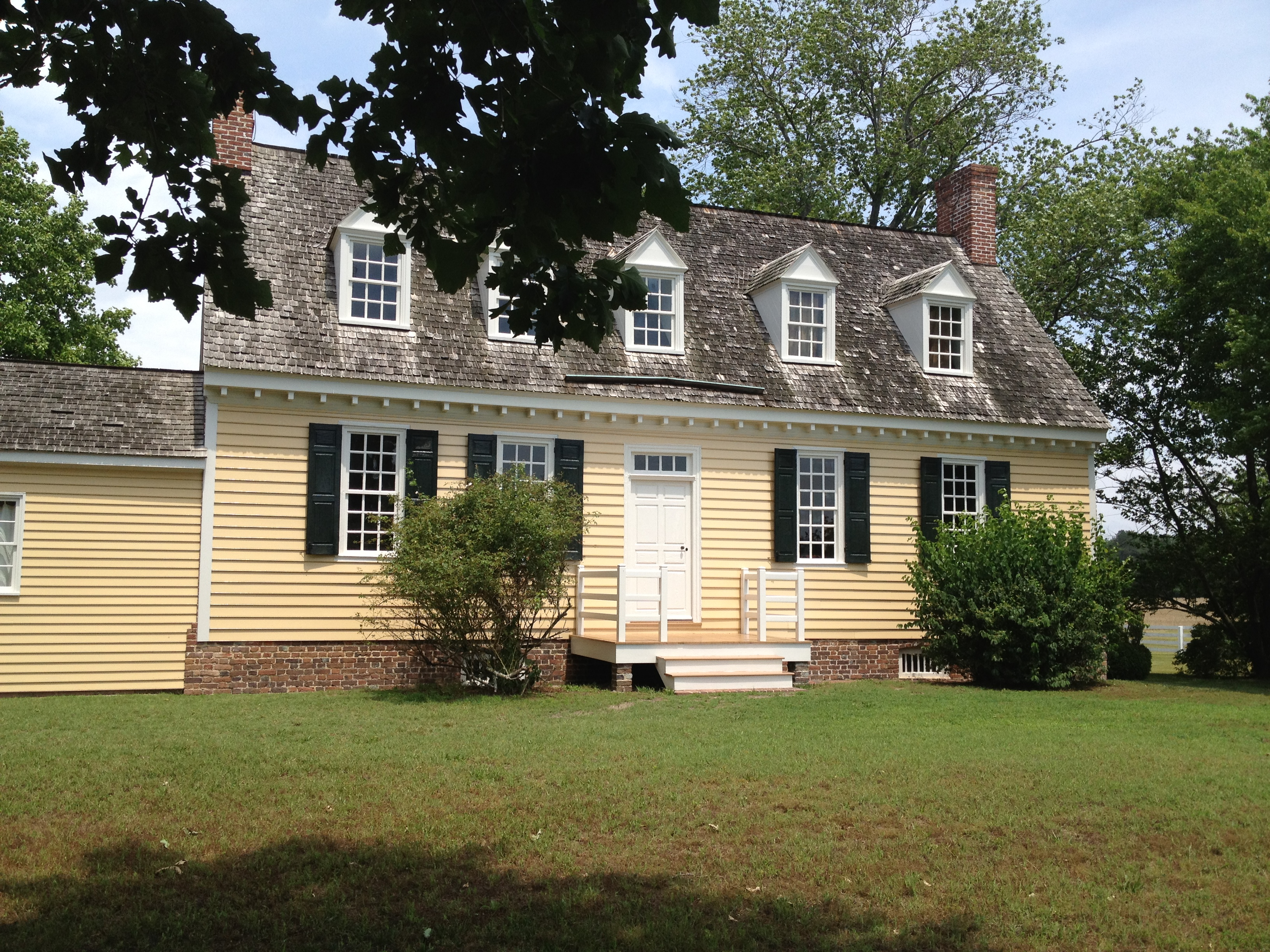
- The main house at Long Hill in 2012

- Location within Maryland Location within the United States
- Nearest city: Wetipquin, Maryland
- Coordinates: 38°19′32″N 75°50′7″W
- Area: 79 acres (32 ha)
- Built: 1767
- NRHP reference No.: 74000978
- Added to NRHP: December 31, 1974

Long Hill is a historic home overlooking Wetipquin Creek in Wetipquin, Wicomico County, Maryland, United States. It was built about 1767 and is a five bay wide wood panelled and brick house set on a brick foundation laid in Flemish bond. It is an essentially untouched Maryland dwelling, dating from the second half of the 18th century. The house is associated with the Dashiell family, several of whom took an active part in the affairs of the colony.

Long Hill was listed on the National Register of Historic Places in 1974.

In February 2026, the state of Maryland purchased Long Hill to be included in the new Wetipquin Creek State Park.
