= F. Leonard Wailes Law Office =

- U.S. National Register of Historic Places
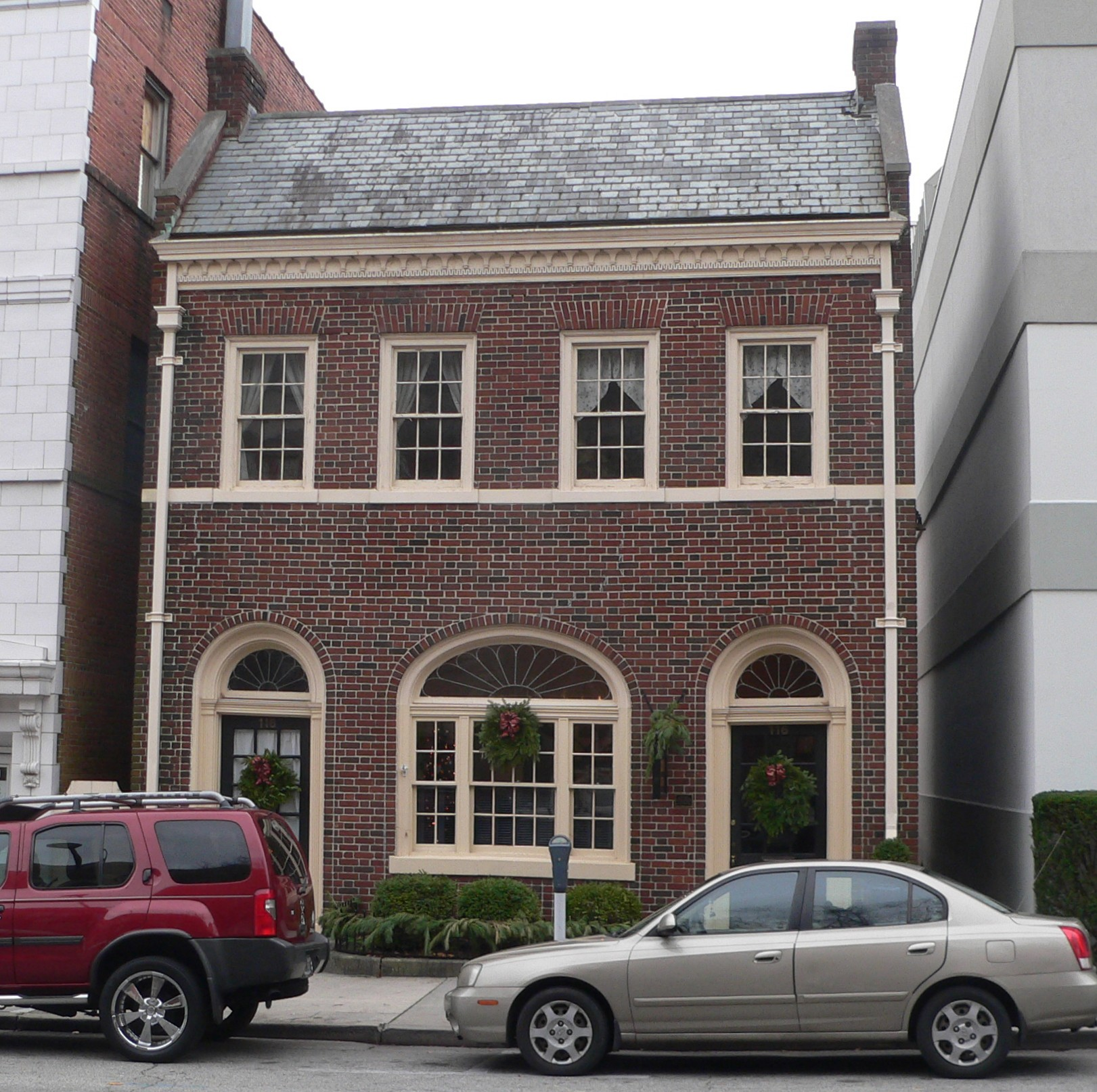

- Location within Maryland Location within the United States
- Location: 116-118 E. Main St., Salisbury, Maryland
- Coordinates: 38.365397°N 75.599786°W
- Area: less than one acre
- Built: 1927
- Architect: Malone, W. Twilley
- Architectural style: Colonial Revival
- NRHP reference No.: 97000314
- Added to NRHP: April 14, 1997

F. Leonard Wailes Law Office is a historic building located at Salisbury, Wicomico County, Maryland. It was constructed in 1927 in the Colonial Revival style. It is a two-story brick building opposite the Wicomico County Courthouse in a line of early- to mid-20th century commercial buildings.

It was listed on the National Register of Historic Places in 1997.
