= Bounds Lott =

Historic house in Maryland

- U.S. National Register of Historic Places
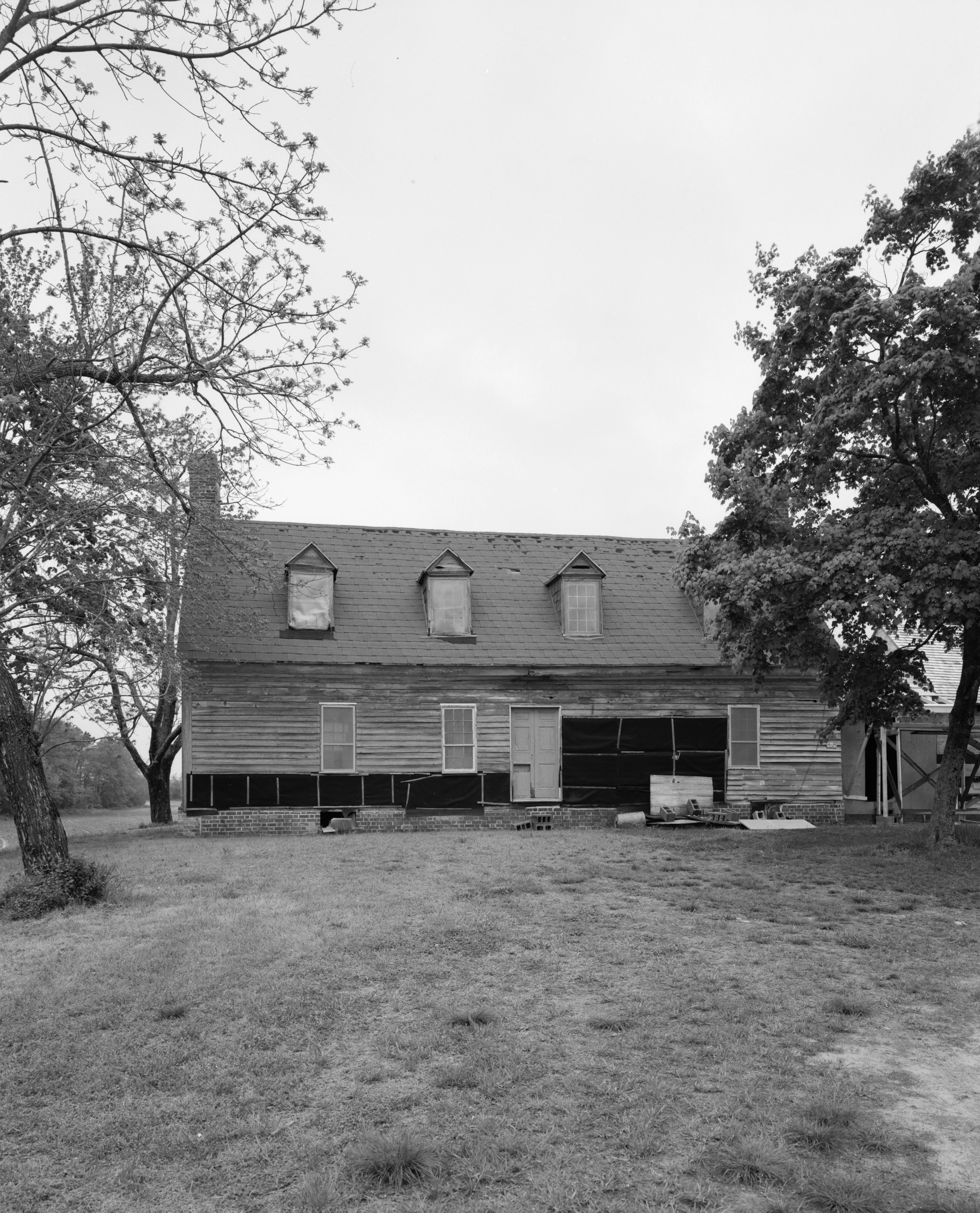
- Southern side of the house

- Location within Maryland Location within the United States
- Location: 4146 Rivermere Lane, Allen, Maryland
- Coordinates: 38°18′32″N 75°44′56″W
- Area: less than one acre
- NRHP reference No.: 78001488
- Added to NRHP: November 14, 1978

Bounds Lott is a historic home located west of Allen in Wicomico County, Maryland, United States. It consists of the original four-bay, 1 1/2-story dwelling with three small additions; two having been moved from Sussex County, Delaware. The additions were remodeled in their new location in 1975.

Bounds Lott was listed on the National Register of Historic Places in 1978.
