= Tyaskin, Maryland =

Tyaskin
- Census-designated place
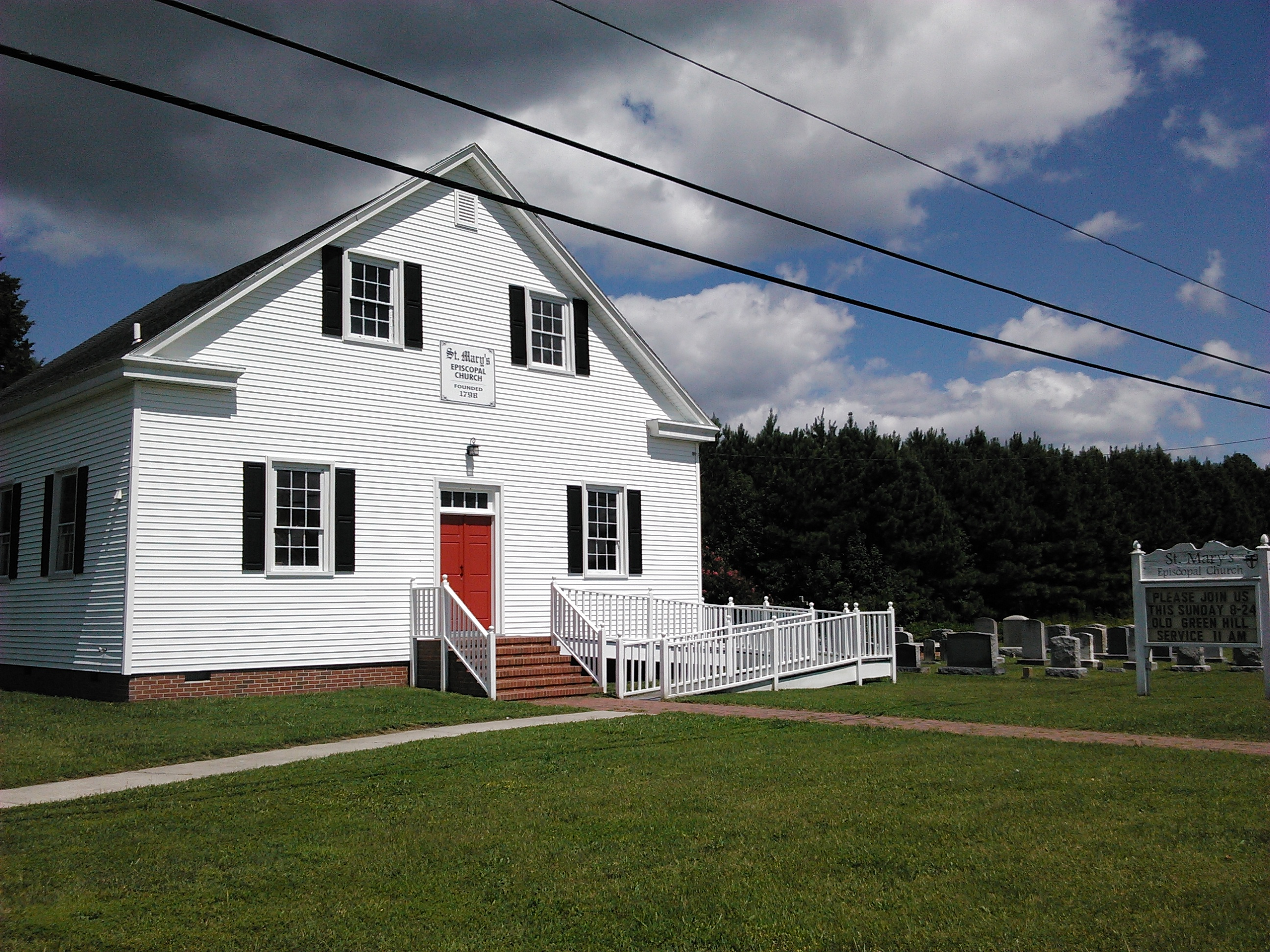
- St. Mary's Episcopal Church in Tyaskin

- Location within the state of Maryland Tyaskin (the United States)
- Coordinates: 38°19′19″N 75°52′25″W
- Country: United States
- State: Maryland
- County: Wicomico

Area
  - Total: 1.42 sq mi (3.68 km^{2})
  - Land: 1.42 sq mi (3.68 km^{2})
  - Water: 0 sq mi (0.00 km^{2})
- Elevation: 20 ft (6.1 m)

Population (2020)
  - Total: 226
  - Density: 158.9/sq mi (61.37/km^{2})
- Time zone: UTC−5 (Eastern (EST))
  - Summer (DST): UTC−4 (EDT)
- ZIP code: 21865
- Area codes: 410 & 443
- FIPS code: 24-79225
- GNIS feature ID: 591446

Tyaskin is an unincorporated community and census-designated place in Wicomico County, Maryland, United States. Its population was 236 as of the 2010 census. It is part of the Salisbury, Maryland-Delaware Metropolitan Statistical Area.

Beaudley was listed on the National Register of Historic Places in 2001.

== Demographics ==
Historical population
Census	Pop.	Note	%±
2020	226		—
U.S. Decennial Census
