= Gillis-Grier House =

Historic house in Maryland, United States

- U.S. National Register of Historic Places
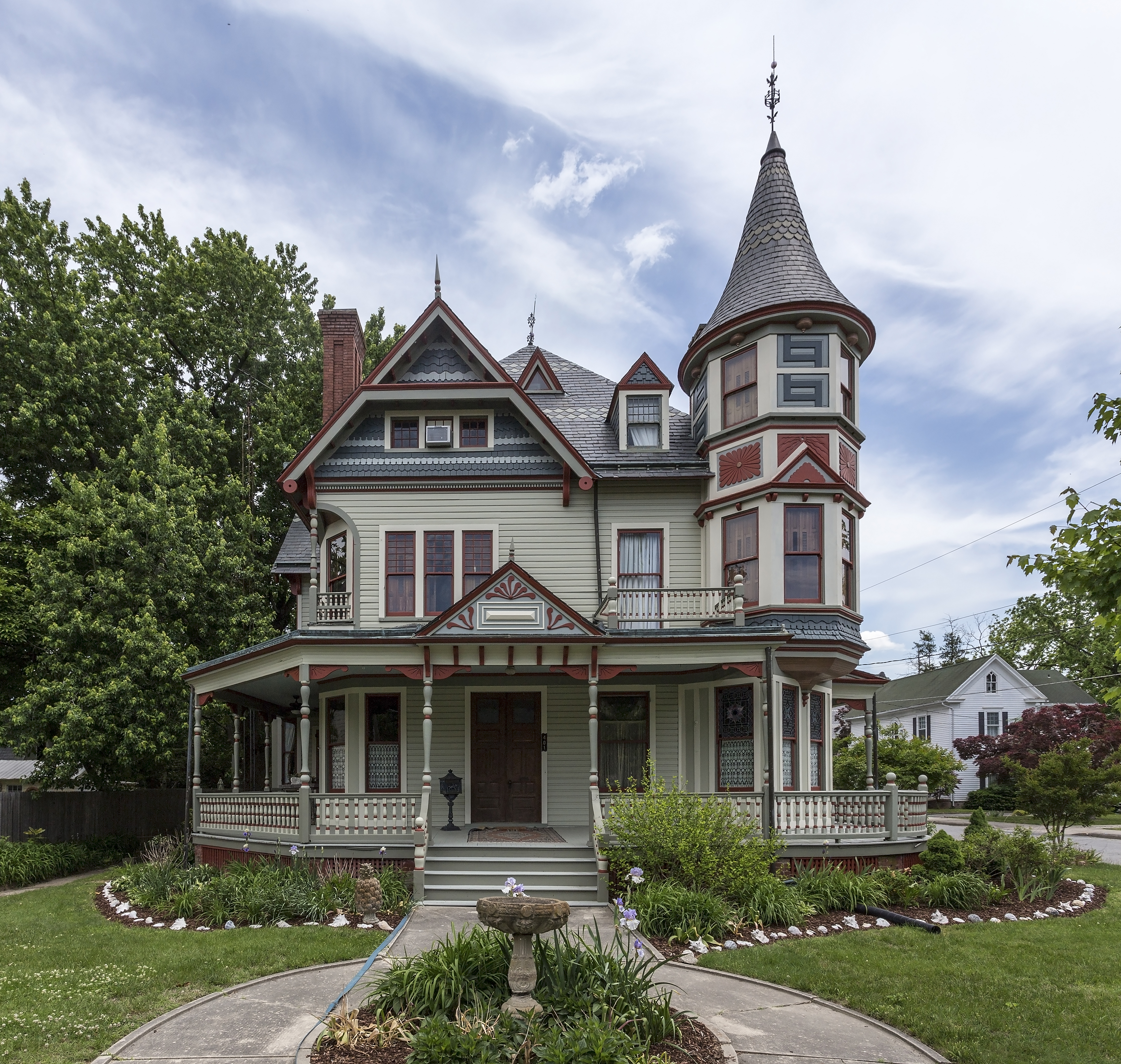

- Location within Maryland Location within the United States
- Location: 401 N. Division St., Salisbury, Maryland
- Coordinates: 38°22′14″N 75°35′54″W
- Area: 0.5 acres (0.20 ha)
- Built: 1887
- NRHP reference No.: 72000589
- Added to NRHP: October 31, 1972

The Gillis-Grier House is a historic home located at Salisbury, Wicomico County, Maryland, United States. It is a 2 1/2-story Queen Anne style frame house built in 1887 by James Cannon. The house has gable-front elevations on three sides, a three-story octagonal tower, and a shorter 2 1/2-story service wing. Also on the property is a frame 1 1/2-story stable, now used as a garage. It is one of the dwellings that define Salisbury's Newtown neighborhood and named after the two inter-related families that held title to the property between 1896 and 1975.

The Gillis-Grier House was listed on the National Register of Historic Places in 1972.
