= Bennett's Adventure =

Historic house in Maryland

- U.S. National Register of Historic Places
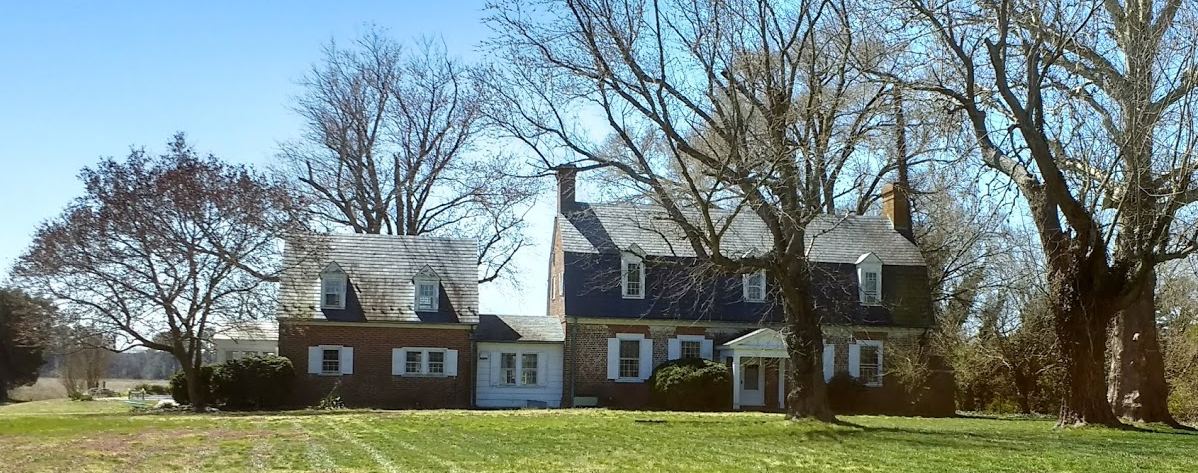

- Location within Maryland Location within the United States
- Location: Collins Wharf Road; Allen, Maryland
- Coordinates: 38°17′2″N 75°44′5″W
- Area: 24 acres (9.7 ha)
- Built: c. 1735
- NRHP reference No.: 75000928
- Added to NRHP: November 20, 1975

Bennett's Adventure is a historic home located three miles west of Allen, on the north bank of Wicomico Creek in Wicomico County, Maryland, United States. It is a 1 1/2-story gambrel-roofed brick house, laid in English bond. It has a traditional two-room plan with central hall. It still has original paneling in the west room and central hall. There were later twentieth-century additions to the house, of a 1 1/2-story wing and connecting hyphen. The creek side has a long screened porch.

The property is also significant for its associations with Richard Bennett, Puritan governor of the Virginia colony from 1652 to 1655, during the reign of Oliver Cromwell. He had a plantation in Isle of Wight County, Virginia, as well as other properties. Also involved in the colony of Maryland, in 1665 Bennett patented 2500 acres on the north side of Wicomico Creek. His grant was large enough to be classified under the Maryland system as a manor.

The property was bought in 1721 by George Dashiell (1690–1748) from one of Bennett's grandchildren; he patented 1740 acres after a re-survey. A wealthy planter, Dashiell is believed to have built the house that currently stands on the property. He served in the Lower House of the Assembly in 1724, 1745, and 1746. He attained the rank of Colonel in the Maryland militia by 1736. His family retained the property until 1791.

Bennett's Adventure was listed on the National Register of Historic Places in 1975.
