= Beaudley =

Historic house in Maryland

- U.S. National Register of Historic Places
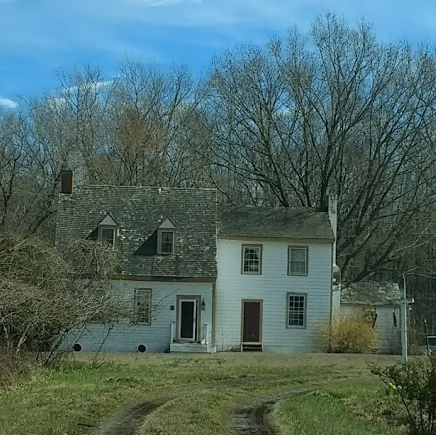

- Location within Maryland Location within the United States
- Location: 3955 Jesterville Road (MD 334), Tyaskin, Maryland
- Coordinates: 38°18′13″N 75°52′10″W
- Area: 5.8 acres (2.3 ha)
- Built: 1795
- Architectural style: Federal
- NRHP reference No.: 01001334
- Added to NRHP: December 7, 2001

Beaudley is a historic home located at Tyaskin, Wicomico County, Maryland, United States. It was built about 1795, and consists of a 1 1/2-story, side-hall, Flemish bond brick-ended frame house with a gable roof. A single-story hyphen joins a slightly taller single-story early-19th-century kitchen to the main house. Attached to the house is a two-story, one-room frame addition erected around 1850. Also on the property are several small outbuildings and a Walter family cemetery.

Beaudley was listed on the National Register of Historic Places in 2001.
