= Asbury Methodist Episcopal Church (Allen, Maryland) =

Historic church in Maryland, United States

- U.S. National Register of Historic Places
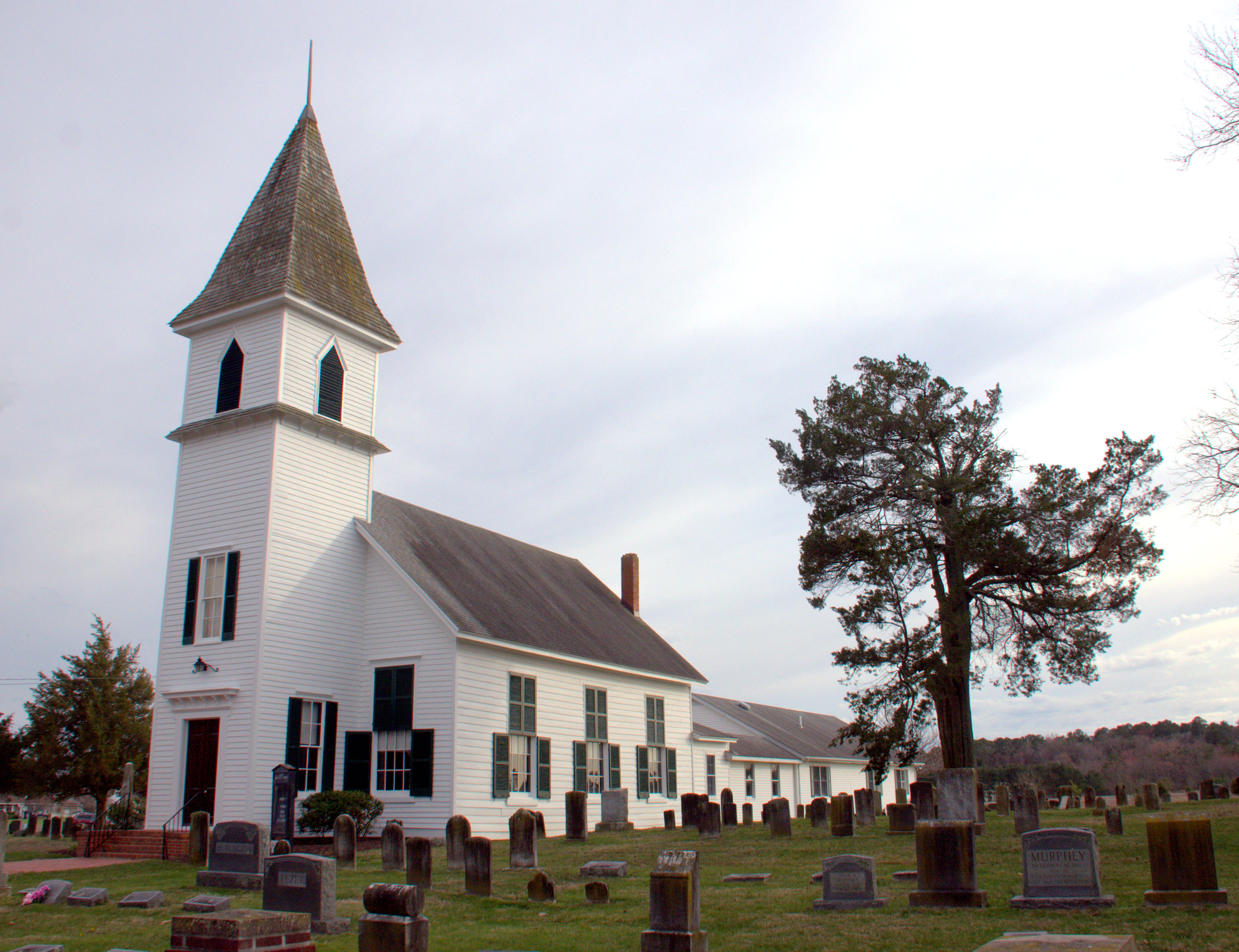

- Location within Maryland Location within the United States
- Location: 26679 Collins Wharf Rd. Allen, Maryland
- Coordinates: 38°17′25″N 75°41′26″W
- Area: 7.5 acres (3.0 ha)
- Built: 1848
- Architect: Twilley, Caleb; et al.
- Architectural style: Late Victorian
- NRHP reference No.: 99001041
- Added to NRHP: August 27, 1999

Asbury Methodist Episcopal Church, known now as Asbury United Methodist Church, is a historic church located at Allen, Wicomico County, Maryland. It is a rectangular, gable-front frame structure, with the entrance located in a square bell tower centered on the front. The main block of the building was constructed in 1848 and the tower was added in 1883.

It was listed on the National Register of Historic Places in 1999.
