= George Washington Carver High School (Rockville, Maryland) =

Segregated public school in Rockville, Maryland

Carver High School

Location
- Rockville, Maryland; U.S. 39.0949°N 77.1578°W

Information
- Former name: Rockville Colored High School; Lincoln High School
- Type: Public
- Established: 1927

George Washington Carver High School and Junior College was the high school for black students in Rockville, Maryland prior to the integration of public schools, which occurred between 1955 and 1961. It replaced two earlier all-black high schools, the first founded in 1927. From that time until integration, there was only one high school for blacks in all of Montgomery County, Maryland.

== History ==
=== 20th century ===
The first high school for black children in Montgomery County, Maryland, originally opened in 1927 as Rockville Colored High School with 40 students. Built partly with money from the Rosenwald Fund, the two-classroom building stood next to the two-room Rockville Colored Elementary School. Both were wooden buildings that shared one bathroom. The county did not initially provide transportation so parents and the black community pooled resources to buy a used bus.

In 1935, the school was replaced by a larger wooden building—covered with bricks to match white high schools—nearby in Rockville and was then known as Lincoln High School. It was soon overcrowded, just as the earlier, smaller high school became.

In 1936, represented by Thurgood Marshall, Rockville Colored Elementary School principal William B. Gibbs Jr. sued the Montgomery County School Board over its practice of paying white teachers nearly double what black ones earned. This resulted in equal pay at all the county's black elementary schools and the high school as well by 1938.

When built in 1950, George Washington Carver High School operated with roughly equal funding with the white schools and was fully accredited. A new brick building with eight classrooms on the first floor, and large science and home economics labs on the second floor, it offered junior college-level courses as well. This was the first post-high school opportunity for black children in Montgomery County, as Montgomery Junior College, located in Takoma Park, was for whites only.

The Carver Class of 1960 was the school's last, the first black elementary schools were closed in 1955 with the remainder by 1961. Black students were distributed to formerly all-white schools throughout the county. Because some schools remained all-white, they were integrated by transferring black teachers from Carver and other schools.

The board took over the facility for its administrative offices, dropping the Carver name, but restored the name after a petition by the NAACP and local black ministers.

=== 21st century ===
In 2002, the building was named a Rockville Historic District.
