= Wetipquin, Maryland =

Unincorporated community in Maryland, United States

Wetipquin
- Unincorporated community
- Location within the state of Maryland Wetipquin (the United States)
- Coordinates: 38°20′12″N 75°50′50″W
- Country: United States
- State: Maryland
- County: Wicomico
- Time zone: UTC-5 (Eastern (EST))
  - Summer (DST): UTC-4 (EDT)

Wetipquin is an unincorporated community in Wicomico County, Maryland, United States.

Long Hill was listed on the National Register of Historic Places in 1974.
