= Lakeview Heights =

Lakeview Heights may refer to:

- Lakeview Heights, British Columbia, Canada
- Lakeview Heights, Kentucky, United States
