= Kim Davis =

American county clerk (born 1965)

Clerk of Rowan County, Kentucky
- In office January 5, 2015 – January 7, 2019
- Preceded by: Jean W. Bailey
- Succeeded by: Elwood Caudill Jr.

Personal details
- Born: Kimberly Jean Bailey; September 17, 1965 (age 61) Morehead, Kentucky, U.S.
- Party: Democratic (1983–2015); Republican (after 2015)
- Spouses: Dwain Wallace (m. 1984; div. 1994) Joe Davis (m. 1996; div. 2006) (m. 2009) Thomas McIntryre (m. 2007; div. 2008)
- Children: 4
- Known for: Refusal to comply with a federal court order directing her to issue marriage licenses following Obergefell v. Hodges

Kimberly Jean Davis (née Bailey; born September 17, 1965) is an American former county clerk for Rowan County, Kentucky, serving from January 2015 to January 2019. She gained public attention in August 2015 when she defied a U.S. federal court order to issue marriage licenses to same-sex couples.

Davis was elected Rowan County Clerk in 2014 and started her four-year term in January 2015. In June 2015, the Supreme Court of the United States decided Obergefell v. Hodges, and all county clerks in Kentucky were ordered to issue marriage licenses to same-sex couples. Citing personal religious objections to same-sex marriage, Davis began denying marriage licenses to all couples to avoid issuing them to same-sex couples. A lawsuit, Miller v. Davis, was filed, and Davis was ordered by the United States District Court for the Eastern District of Kentucky to start issuing marriage licenses. She appealed to the U.S. Supreme Court, but the application to appeal was denied. Davis continued to defy the court order by refusing to issue marriage licenses "under God's authority"; she was ultimately jailed for contempt of court and was ordered to pay $360,000 to the same-sex couple who she refused to marry. Davis was released after five days in jail under the condition that she not interfere with the efforts of her deputy clerks, who had begun issuing marriage licenses to all couples in her absence. Davis then modified the Kentucky marriage licenses used in her office so that they no longer mentioned her name.

Davis's actions drew strong and mixed reactions from prominent politicians, legal experts, and religious leaders. Attorney and author Roberta A. Kaplan described Davis as "the clearest example of someone who wants to use a religious liberty argument to discriminate", while law professor Eugene Volokh maintained that an employer must try to accommodate religious employees' beliefs. Republican presidential candidate Mike Huckabee said that Davis's imprisonment was part of the "criminalization of Christianity", while Washington Post columnist Jennifer Rubin compared Davis's refusal to obey the decision of the U.S. Supreme Court to Alabama Governor George Wallace's "Stand in the Schoolhouse Door" in 1963. A few weeks after her release from jail, Davis met with Pope Francis in Washington, D.C. The Holy See Press Office later noted that the pope met with many others and said that the meeting was not a form of support for Davis's actions. She has been satirized in popular culture; she was parodied in a Funny or Die video, as well as on Saturday Night Live. She was defeated by Democratic challenger Elwood Caudill Jr. in the November 6, 2018, election and vacated the office on January 7, 2019.

== Career ==
The county seat of Rowan County, Kentucky is Morehead, Kentucky.

=== Chief deputy clerk: 1991–2015 ===
Kim Davis was born on September 17, 1965, in Morehead, Kentucky. By 1991, she was serving as chief deputy clerk of Rowan County, Kentucky, reporting to her mother, Rowan County Clerk Jean W. Bailey. Davis's 2011 compensation was $51,812 (equivalent to $74,154 in 2025) in wages with an additional $11,301 (equivalent to $16,174 in 2025) in overtime and other compensation. She earned more than other chief deputies in the county, (Note: Chief Deputy Sheriff Joe Cline received $38,000 annually and Deputy Judge-Executive Jerry Alderman $36,000 annually; neither received overtime pay.) and some county employees and residents complained to the county's governing body, the Fiscal Court, that the clerk's staff's wages were too high, with total compensation for five employees being about $198,000. The Fiscal Court then voted to cut the 2012 budget for wages from $300,000 to $200,000.

=== County clerk: 2015–2019 ===
After her mother announced she would not run for re-election in 2014, Davis filed as a Democratic candidate for county clerk. At a candidates' forum, Davis stated she felt she was best qualified for the position because of her 26 years of experience in the clerk's office.

Davis narrowly won the Democratic primary election, defeating Elwood Caudill Jr., a deputy clerk in the Rowan County property valuation administrator's office, by 23 votes and advancing to the general election against Republican John Cox. Davis won the election, with Cox subsequently alleging that nepotism was to blame for his loss. After winning the race, Davis told The Morehead News, "My words can never express the appreciation but I promise to each and every one that I will be the very best working clerk that I can be and will be a good steward of their tax dollars and follow the statutes of this office to the letter."

Davis took the oath of office as the county clerk of Rowan County on January 5, 2015, beginning a four-year term slated to end on January 7, 2019. As clerk in 2015, Davis received an annual salary of $80,000 (equivalent to $108,662 in 2025).

== Same-sex marriage license controversy ==
=== Background ===
On June 26, 2015, the U.S. Supreme Court ruled in the landmark case of Obergefell v. Hodges, holding that the fundamental right to marry is guaranteed to same-sex couples by both the Due Process Clause and the Equal Protection Clause of the Fourteenth Amendment to the U.S. Constitution. Fourteen counties in three Southern states continued to deny marriage licenses for same-sex marriage. The Alabama Supreme Court allowed the probate judges of ten counties in Alabama to deny such marriage licenses, the clerk of one Texas county chose to resign rather than issue such licenses, and the clerks of two counties in Kentucky were not issuing licenses due to paperwork delays. Kentucky Governor Steve Beshear ordered all Kentucky county clerks to begin issuing same-sex marriage licenses immediately.

=== Davis's reaction to same-sex marriage ruling ===
Davis asks for the video camera to be turned off as she refuses David Ermold and David Moore (pictured) a marriage license. Release of the video ignited national controversy.

Davis contacted Beshear, asking for an executive order to protect clerks who have moral objections against personally issuing such marriage licenses, as Kentucky law requires county clerks to issue marriage licenses in their names. She began turning away gay couples from her county office who were seeking marriage licenses. David Ermold and David Moore, a same-sex couple from Morehead, Kentucky and alumni of Morehead State University, released video footage on July 7, 2015, of Davis refusing to issue them a marriage license and requesting that they turn off their camera. The video went viral overnight.

The Family Foundation of Kentucky, a local political organization, held a protest rally against the ruling at the State Capitol in Frankfort on August 22, 2015, attended by several thousand people. The clerks of the two other Kentucky counties declined to speak to the rally crowd, but Davis spoke briefly, saying, "I need your prayers ... to continue to stand firm in what we believe." At a competing event several blocks away organized by the Fairness Campaign of Louisville, attendees celebrated the Supreme Court's decision and called upon government officials to uphold the law.

Rather than issue marriage licenses to same-sex couples, Davis began denying marriage licenses to all couples.

=== Lawsuits against Davis ===
Six couples who were denied marriage licenses by Davis sued her in her official capacity as county clerk. Four couples were represented by the American Civil Liberties Union (ACLU) of Kentucky, and each couple had separate legal representation. The four couples represented by the ACLU, two same-sex couples and two opposite-sex couples, filed the first lawsuit against Davis (Miller v. Davis) on July 2, 2015. On July 10, 2015, David Ermold and David Moore (who had shot the viral video) next filed suit against Davis, represented by Joseph Buckles and Thomas Szczygielski (Ermold v. Davis); James Yates and William Smith Jr., represented by Rene Heinrich of the Heinrich Firm PLLC and Kash Stilz of Roush & Stilz PSC, filed a suit against Davis on August 25, 2015 (Yates v. Davis).

Federal district judge David L. Bunning of the United States District Court for the Eastern District of Kentucky, the judge assigned to the cases, held hearings with Davis in Ashland, at which she was the only witness. Davis argued tearfully that issuing licenses under her name violated her beliefs, citing her religious rights under the First Amendment: "It wasn't just a spur-of-the-moment decision", she said. "It was thought out, and I sought God on it." Davis had already decided against resigning from her post, as doing so, she said, would only leave the matter to her deputies: "If I resign, I solve nothing. It helps nobody." Governor Beshear stated that he would not call a special session of the General Assembly to address Davis's concerns, while other state legislators believed that such a session could accommodate Davis with possible new legislation. Davis's attorneys, from the Maitland, Florida–based law firm Liberty Counsel, (Note: Liberty Counsel had already entered the debate over same-sex marriage by representing the eleven Alabama probate judges refusing to issue marriage licenses to same-sex couples.) stated that the plaintiffs were free to drive to other counties to obtain their same-sex marriage licenses, with one adding, "This case is not about these plaintiffs' desires to get married, the case is about [their] desire to force Kim Davis to approve and authorize their marriage in violation of her constitutionally protected religious beliefs." Davis and her attorneys then sued Governor Beshear for ordering her to violate her religious beliefs instead of trying to accommodate them, arguing that Beshear, not Davis, should be held accountable for any legal damages from the ACLU lawsuit.

On August 12, Bunning issued a temporary stay barring Davis from "applying her 'no marriage licenses' policy to future marriage license requests". Before the stay expired, the United States Court of Appeals for the Sixth Circuit refused to extend that ruling for an appeal. "It cannot be defensibly argued that the holder of the Rowan County clerk's office ... may decline to act in conformity with the United States Constitution", the three-judge panel wrote unanimously in their refusal, continuing, "There is thus little or no likelihood that the clerk in her official capacity will prevail on appeal."

=== Appeal ===
Liberty Counsel and Davis filed an emergency application to appeal with the U.S. Supreme Court. On August 31, 2015, in a one-line order, the Supreme Court refused to hear the appeal, preventing Davis from legally continuing to deny marriage licenses. In response to the U.S. Supreme Court's refusal to grant her stay request, Davis stated:

I never imagined a day like this would come, where I would be asked to violate a central teaching of Scripture and of Jesus Himself regarding marriage. To issue a marriage license which conflicts with God's definition of marriage, with my name affixed to the certificate, would violate my conscience.

Davis continued to defy Bunning's court order after the Supreme Court's refusal. The following morning, several couples sought to obtain marriage licenses, but Davis turned them away, saying she was acting "under God's authority". Some in the media questioned whether Davis, having been married four times and only recently converted, was acting hypocritically in the application of her beliefs.

=== Contempt of court and jailing ===
Judge Bunning ordered Davis and her six deputy clerks to appear before him on September 3 after the six couples sought to have her held in contempt of court. Bunning ruled in the plaintiffs' favor and held Davis in contempt. The ACLU asked the court to fine Davis, but Bunning ordered her remanded in custody after the hearing. The judge said Davis would remain there until she complied with the court's order to issue marriage licenses. Bunning then spoke with each of the deputy clerks who reported to Davis. Only her son, Nathan Davis, told the judge he refused to comply with the court's order to start issuing marriage licenses; Bunning declined to hold him in contempt. After the hearing, U.S. Marshals transported Davis to the Carter County Detention Center in Grayson.

On Friday, September 4, the first day her office was open during her incarceration, Davis's deputy clerks began issuing marriage licenses to all couples. James Yates and William Smith Jr. (independently suing Davis) were the first couple in Rowan County to receive a marriage license since Obergefell. They were soon followed by other couples who were plaintiffs against Davis.

Through her Liberty Counsel attorneys, Davis filed an appeal of the order holding her in contempt of court, asking that she be released immediately from jail and that her name be removed from marriage licenses so her deputies can issue them. Separately, Davis asked Governor Beshear to free her. The governor's office said that the conflict was a "matter between her and the courts"; Beshear added that he lacked the legal authority to either remove Davis from office or to relieve Davis of her statutory duties. Rowan County Democratic Judge-Executive Walter Blevins stated that he did not believe he would need to appoint a replacement for Davis, and that he believed the Attorney General of Kentucky and "the General Assembly will pass something where marriage licenses don't have anyone's name on them".

=== Release and return to work ===
Five days later, on Tuesday, September 8, Bunning ordered Davis released from jail. The order stated: "Defendant Davis shall not interfere in any way, directly or indirectly, with the efforts of her deputy clerks to issue marriage licenses to all legally eligible couples. If Defendant Davis should interfere in any way with their issuance, that will be considered a violation of this order and appropriate sanctions will be considered."

Bunning's order also stated that Davis's deputy clerks must continue to comply with his earlier order to issue marriage licenses and to submit status reports to him every fourteen days confirming their compliance. The deputy clerks released statements pledging to continue issuing licenses after Davis's release and to ignore any order from her to do otherwise, complying with the federal judge's order. Licenses issued since Davis's refusal state that they are authorized by "the office of the Rowan County Clerk" but no longer bear her name. Davis's supporters, gathered at the Rowan County Courthouse since her first day in custody, said that her deputies were unlawfully issuing licenses and should resign or be fired. (Note: After Davis's release from jail, the Oath Keepers—an armed right-wing militia group—offered to provide a "security detail" to Davis to help prevent U.S. Marshals from re-arresting her for contempt. Davis declined the offer.)

Davis returned to work a week later, on September 14, 2015. She said that, while she would not interfere with any deputy clerk who issues marriage licenses, she would not personally issue or authorize any of the forms. She created several altered versions of the Kentucky marriage license form and instructed her deputy clerks to use them, which had her name and reference to the clerk's office removed. The ACLU sued Davis separately for these form alterations, which they found to be of questionable legality. (Note: The form alterations that the ACLU objected to were: 1. The phrase "in the office of" is struck. 2. The phrase "county clerk" is struck. 3. In place of her name, the form now says "Pursuant to Federal Court Order #15-CV-44 DLB". 4. In place of the title "deputy clerk", required on the form, it now reads "notary public".) Governor Steve Beshear was asked by Bunning to brief the court on the validity of the licenses. Governor Beshear acknowledged that Kentucky would recognize the licenses, but he could not verify their legality or the means by which the marriage licenses were altered. Bunning ultimately denied the ACLU's separate suit, stating the altered forms were likely legal and that Davis was now abiding by the court's order.

While Davis remained inside her personal office, same-sex couples successfully walked out of the Rowan County clerk's office with their marriage licenses. One of the applicants said, "My license is valid, and it's valid because of the court order that's in effect ... It doesn't have to have her signature."

=== Reactions to controversy ===
Government officials are free to disagree with the law, but not disobey it.

— Kerry B. Harvey, United States Attorney for the Eastern District of Kentucky

Davis gained public attention after her refusal to issue marriage licenses and the ensuing controversy her actions caused. Many legal experts asserted that Davis had no standing under the law to refuse to issue the licenses. Columbia Law School professor Katherine Franke said, "Kim Davis has all sorts of religious liberty rights secured under the First Amendment and under other laws, but they are not at stake in this case. All she's asked to do with couples that come before her is certify that they've met the state requirements for marriage, so her religious opposition to same-sex marriage is absolutely irrelevant." Professor Stephen Vladeck of American University's Washington College of Law said that Davis "waived any right to have an objection to issuing same-sex marriage licenses when she ran for the job". Washington Post columnist Jennifer Rubin and others compared Davis's refusal to follow orders of the U.S. Supreme Court to Alabama Governor George Wallace's futile "Stand in the Schoolhouse Door" protest of desegregation in 1963. The Human Rights Campaign, a national LGBT civil rights group, said, "Ms. Davis has the fundamental right to believe what she likes ... but as a public servant, she does not have the right to pick and choose which laws she will follow or which services she will provide." Attorney and author Roberta A. Kaplan, who argued for the plaintiffs in United States v. Windsor, wrote that "Kim Davis is the clearest example of someone who wants to use a religious liberty argument to discriminate, yet she swore an oath to uphold the Constitution. It is laughable that she can then decide which laws to enforce, which is why every decision in her case has gone against her."

Opposition to the federal ruling came from political columnists William McGurn of The Wall Street Journal and Ray Nothstine of The Christian Post. Law professor Eugene Volokh suggested that the Kentucky's state religious freedom restoration act might compel the state to accommodate Davis's religious beliefs and argued that state courts have the authority to order the removal of Davis's name from marriage licenses. Kentucky Senate President Robert Stivers also came to Davis's defense; he stated, in an amicus brief filed in federal court, that the "Supreme Court ruling has completely obliterated the definition of marriage". Liberty Counsel, the law firm defending Davis, stated, "Kim Davis is being treated as a criminal because she cannot violate her conscience", stating also that she refused to accept a proposed compromise where she would no longer be found in contempt if she agreed not to interfere with her deputies issuing licenses to same-sex couples.

Reactions against Davis also came from the White House, Kentucky Governor Steve Beshear, and candidates in the 2016 presidential election. White House Press Secretary Josh Earnest said, "No public official is above the rule of law. Certainly not the president of the United States, but neither is the Rowan County clerk." Governor Beshear said the judge's decision "speaks for itself", while his attorneys called the legal arguments in her suit against him "absurd". Democratic presidential candidate Hillary Clinton said, "Officials should be held to their duty to uphold the law – end of story." Several Republican presidential candidates also called on Davis to comply with court orders. Donald Trump said, "the decision's been made, and that is the law of the land." Jeb Bush, former governor of Florida, said Davis "is sworn to uphold the law", but also suggested that some sort of accommodation be made for her. Republican presidential candidates Carly Fiorina and Senator Lindsey Graham of South Carolina both suggested that Davis should comply with the court order or resign.

Several national Republican politicians supported Davis. Republican presidential candidate Mike Huckabee, the former governor of Arkansas, said that the Kim Davis affair was part of a "criminalization of Christianity" and organized a rally for Davis outside the jail where she had been held. Senator Ted Cruz of Texas, another Republican presidential candidate, said that Davis was a victim of "judicial tyranny" and attended the same rally. Louisiana Governor Bobby Jindal and Senator Rand Paul of Kentucky, also presidential candidates, both voiced their support for Davis. Matt Bevin, the Republican nominee for Kentucky governor in the 2015 election, said a simple solution to Davis's plight is for the government to stop providing marriage contracts.

A YouGov survey of American adults conducted in September 2015 found that 56% supported Judge Bunning's decision to jail Davis for contempt of court, while 31% opposed it. When asked what Davis should do, 65% said that Davis should resign from office; 23% said that Davis should stay in office and continue to refuse to issue marriage licenses to same-sex couples; and 4% said that Davis should remain in office but issue licenses to all persons legally entitled to one.

=== Opposition by other court clerks ===
Other court clerks in the U.S. have also refused to issue marriage licenses to same-sex couples. The probate judges of several counties in Alabama have stopped issuing marriage licenses to anyone. Probate Judge Nick Williams of Washington County, Alabama, said he stopped issuing licenses altogether to avoid discrimination and said, "I completely disagree with the authority the Supreme Court has." Probate Judge John Enslen of Elmore County, Alabama, said the federal government, not state probate offices, should be the entity issuing same-sex marriage licenses. Casey Davis (unrelated to Kim Davis), a clerk in Casey County, Kentucky, said, "We've not tried to prevent same-sex marriages, we've only tried to exercise our First Amendment rights," adding that such applicants could apply in other counties. Kay Schwartz, a clerk in Whitley County, Kentucky, felt oppressed: "There's a law against bullying ... Why take away the majority's right [just] to give the minority their rights?" She suggested the possibility of other options to meet the needs of same-sex applicants, such as an online service. The ACLU has no plans for legal action against other court clerks or probate judges. National attention has not been on them as the ACLU brought no case against them, speculated University of Kentucky political science professor D. B. Riggle: "The action in Rowan County may be in part due to the availability of plaintiffs for a case."

=== Decisions and issues ===
You asked why I couldn't issue you a marriage license, and I'm explaining to you, I'm showing you why I cannot. They didn't want to hear that, though. They wanted to shove that paper down my throat and make me eat it for my dinner.

— Kim Davis, May 2016

Under Kentucky law, a commonwealth's attorney has the power to indict various local officials including "judges-executives, justices of the peace, sheriffs, coroners, surveyors, jailers, county attorneys and constables" for "malfeasance in office or willful neglect in the discharge of official duties" (an offense punishable by removal from office and a fine of up to $1,000); however, the statute doesn't include county clerks. USA Today writer Andrew Wolfson blamed "some reason lost to history" for the omission. Because Davis is an elected official, she cannot simply be fired. For Davis to have been removed from the office of county clerk, impeachment proceedings would have had to have been initiated by the Kentucky House of Representatives and charges for impeachment brought to the Kentucky Senate.

After being denied a license four times, one couple asked the Rowan County Attorney's Office to investigate Davis for official misconduct, a misdemeanor under Kentucky law. Official misconduct in the first degree is a Class A misdemeanor and is punishable with imprisonment not to exceed 12 months and fines of $500. The Rowan County Attorney's Office is prohibited from prosecuting Davis; Rowan County Attorney Cecil Watkins referred the official misconduct complaint to the Kentucky Attorney General's office, led by Attorney General Jack Conway. The Kentucky Attorney General's office conducted a review, and Conway issued a statement saying, "We are a nation of laws, and no one can defy an order from a federal judge." Conway then issued a one-sentence statement saying that he would not appoint a special prosecutor to investigate Davis.

Months after Davis's office began issuing same-sex marriage licenses, Davis's lawyers filed a motion asking the United States Court of Appeals for the Sixth Circuit to overturn four of Judge Bunning's decisions, calling them a "rush to judgment" that "imposed direct pressure and substantial burden on Davis, forcing her to choose between her religious beliefs and forfeiting her essential personal freedom on one hand, or abandoning those beliefs to keep her freedom on the other hand". The court denied the motion on November 5. Davis's lawyers filed their last appeal the next day, requesting a delay in issuing marriage licenses to same sex couples, arguing that previous decisions should apply only to the four couples to whom Davis's office was initially ordered to issue licenses. The appeal also asked the Sixth Circuit Court of Appeals to overturn a prior ruling that sent Davis to jail for failing to comply. This final appeal was denied two days later by the court.

In March 2016, the Campaign for Accountability (CfA), a Washington, D.C.-based nonprofit group, made a request to Davis for access to public records under the Kentucky Open Records Act, seeking copies of retainer agreements and lawyer-client engagement agreements between Davis and her attorneys at Liberty Counsel. Liberty Counsel, which responded to the request on Davis's behalf, refused to comply, arguing that the documents were preliminary and private records are not subject to the Act. CfA appealed to the Office of the Kentucky Attorney General, which under Kentucky law has the authority to make binding rulings on the Open Records Act, and resubmitted its request to Davis's office in April 2016. The Attorney General's Office sought to privately review the records at issue to determine if an exemption applied, but Liberty Counsel refused to make most of the documents available for a private review. In an opinion issued on June 30, 2016, the Attorney General's Office determined that Davis had violated the Open Records Act, saying that her conduct had the effect of "intentionally frustrating the attorney general's review of an open records request" which "would subvert the General Assembly's intent behind providing review by the attorney general."

One of the first acts of newly elected Kentucky Governor Matt Bevin was to issue an executive order removing clerks' names from state marriage licenses. Bevin expressed his hope on November 6, 2015, that the executive order would protect the religious beliefs of officials who are opposed to gay marriage. Kim Davis and her attorneys at Liberty Counsel immediately requested that the court dismiss her appeals, because the new regulation provides a religious accommodation for her and makes the case moot. Bunning agreed, dismissing the three lawsuits filed against her, saying the new governor's order to use a license form that does not require the county clerk's signature has removed the controversy before the court. One of the plaintiff couples who were denied marriage licenses from Davis contacted Bunning, requesting they be allowed to recoup $230,000 in legal fees. Davis's attorneys asserted that their legislative victory resolved the matter; because the couples did not prevail against Davis, they are not entitled to demand that Davis reimburse their legal fees. Separately, Rowan County filed a response contending that the county government should never have to pay for the actions of a single county clerk. Then, by May 2017, a Cincinnati federal appeals court found that Bunning had erred in finding that damages claims by plaintiff couple David Ermold and David Moore became moot, saying, "The district court's characterization of this case as simply contesting the 'no marriage licenses' policy is inaccurate, because Ermold and Moore did not seek an injunction—they sought only damages"; observing that the record does not prevent damages claims. The three-judge panel granted leave for the couple to sue for damages over one marriage license. Their case was sent back to Bunning, where he stated that the state of Kentucky was obligated to pay $222,000 in legal fees. The ACLU itself sued Davis to recover $233,000 in legal fees, but the motion was denied; the organization was not a "prevailing party" in the legal action.

In July 2017, Davis was again sued for failing to issue a marriage license. The plaintiff, Mark Sevier, a Vanderbilt University Law School graduate, was denied a license to marry a laptop computer. A similar Florida lawsuit was dismissed in May.

By February 2019, Governor Bevin formally rejected the idea that Kentucky should bear the $222,000 financial responsibility, insisting the amount should be paid by Kim Davis alone. "Only Davis refused to comply with the law," Bevin stated through his attorneys, insisting taxpayers "should not have to collectively bear the financial responsibility for Davis's intransigence." However, Bunning issued a preliminary injunction ordering the state of Kentucky to pay her legal fees, writing that "Davis represented the Commonwealth of Kentucky when she refused to issue marriage licenses to legally eligible couples. The buck stops there." Local reporting acknowledged that Bevin had previously backed her refusal to issue marriage licenses to same-sex couples.

The emotional damages claims by the plaintiff couple, David Ermold and David Moore, continued on August 23, 2019, when the U.S. 6th Circuit Court of Appeals in Cincinnati upheld Bunning's decision ordering Kentucky to pay their $225,000 legal bill. Bunning ruled on March 18, 2022, that Davis violated the constitutional rights in both the Miller and Ermold cases, stating that she "cannot use her own constitutional rights as a shield to violate the constitutional rights of others while performing her duties as an elected official." The decision allowed the plaintiffs in Miller and Ermold to continue to seek legal fees and other damages from Davis through a jury trial. A jury ordered Davis to pay Ermold and Moore $100,000 in damages on September 13, 2023. Bunning added $260,000 in attorneys' fees and expenses.

Seeking to reverse the jury's verdict in the Sixth Circuit and overturn Bunning's 2022 decision, as well as overturn the Obergefell decision, Davis's lawyers from Liberty Counsel filed a writ of certiorari with the U.S. Supreme Court in July 2025. In her petition, Davis asserted that she still believed that the First Amendment guarantees her right to deny marriage licenses, and she argued that the same-sex marriage decision had been "egregiously wrong". The court considered her challenge at its private conference in November 2025 and declined her case without comment. According to Newsweek, after 10 years of lawsuits, Davis will face legal bills in the six figures.

== Meeting with Pope Francis ==
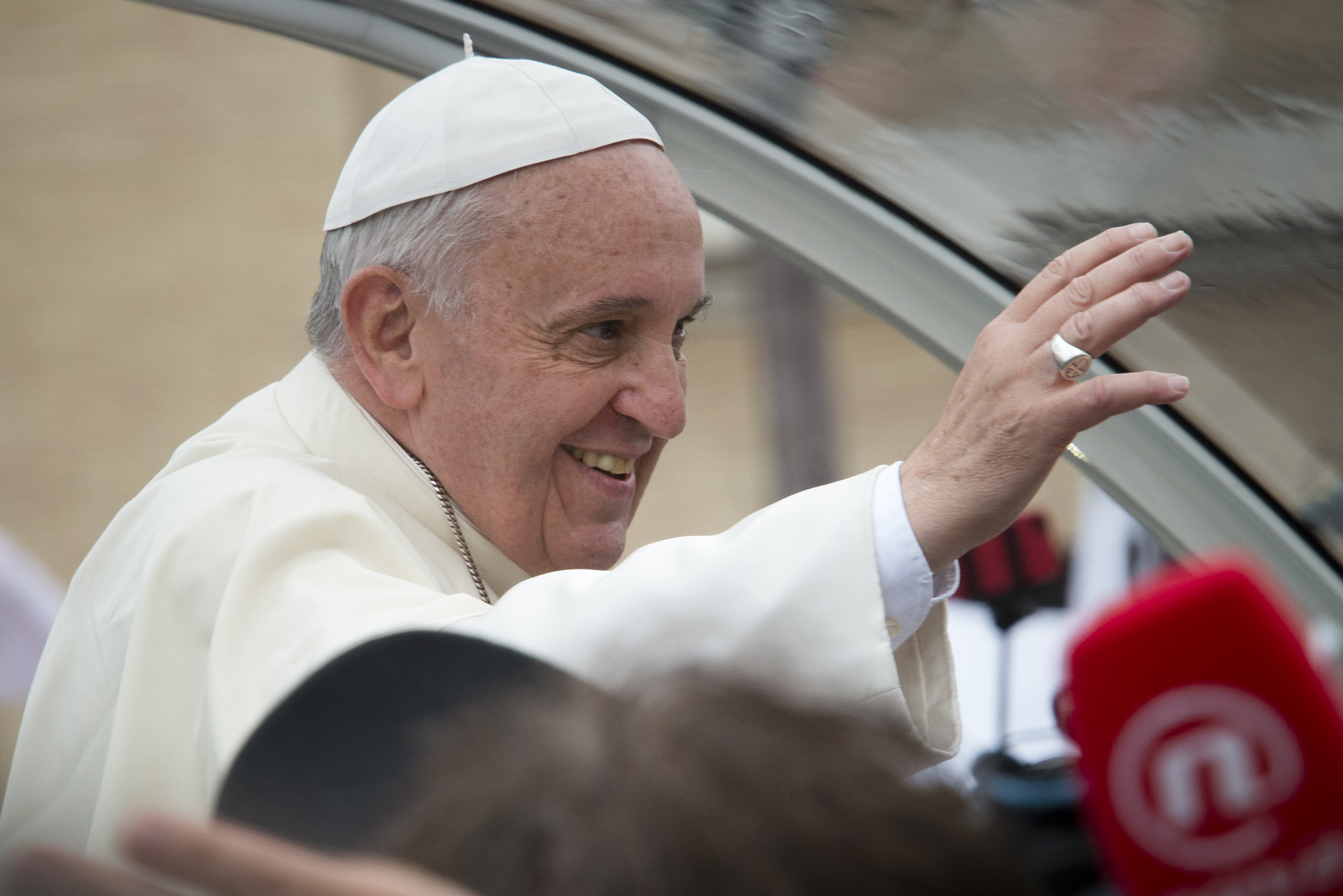
Pope Francis visited the U.S. in September 2015.

Within a few weeks of Davis's release from jail, Davis announced she and her husband had met with Pope Francis on September 24, 2015, at the Apostolic Nunciature to the United States in Washington, D.C., during the Pope's U.S. visit in September 2015. According to Davis and her lawyer, the pope told Davis to "stay strong" and gave her two rosaries. Vaticanist John L. Allen Jr. said that "there's no way to view the encounter other than as a broad gesture of support by the pope for conscientious objection from gay marriage laws" and that the gesture strengthened the hand of those who defend religious freedom.

Two days later, the Holy See Press Office issued a statement saying that "the Pope did not enter into the details of the situation of Mrs. Davis and his meeting with her should not be considered a form of support of her position in all of its particular and complex aspects". According to Vatican spokesman Father Thomas Rosica, the Pope met with several dozen other people, and rosaries were also given to others in attendance; Davis was not invited by the Pope to the Nunciature, and "the meeting may have been manipulated by her and her lawyer". The only audience given by the Pope while in Washington was with a former student of his, an openly gay Argentine named Yayo Grassi, and Grassi's same-sex partner of 19 years. Observers speculated whether the Pope had not been informed of Davis's controversy or if the Vatican had underestimated the media impact that such a meeting would cause. A reporter asked Pope Francis if he supported individuals, including government officials, who have a contentious objection to certain duties such as issuing marriage licenses to same-sex couples. He responded:

"I can’t have in mind all cases that can exist about conscience objection but yes, I can say conscientious objection is a right that is a part of every human right ...If a person does not allow others to be a conscientious objector, he denies a right. ... Conscientious objection must enter into every judicial structure ... Otherwise we would end up in a situation where we select what is a right, saying 'this right that has merit, this one does not.'"

== Reelection campaign ==
Davis announced that she would run for reelection in 2018 as a Republican. Davis did not face any challengers in the Republican primary. Four Democrats ran in the May 2018 primary with the winner being Rowan County Assistant Property Valuation Administrator Elwood Caudill Jr., whom Davis narrowly defeated in the Democratic primary in 2014. One of the Democrats Caudill defeated was David Ermold, who had been denied a marriage license by Davis and then filed suit against her. Davis lost her reelection campaign on November 6, 2018, when she was defeated by Caudill in the general election by a little over 8 percentage points.

== Personal life ==
Davis has been married four times to three husbands. The first three marriages ended in divorce in 1994, 2006, and 2008. Davis has two children from her first marriage, and twins by her third husband who were born five months after her first divorce. The twins were adopted by her second and current husband, Joe Davis; they divorced in 2006 but remarried after her third divorce. Joe has stated support for her stance against same-sex marriage. Davis hired her own son, Nathan, as a deputy clerk in her office; he took the same position of denying marriage licenses to same-sex couples. Shortly after the same-sex marriage license controversy, Davis said she and her husband switched from the Democratic Party to the Republican Party.

Davis says she experienced a religious awakening in 2011, following her mother-in-law's dying wish that she attend church. Since then Davis has identified herself as a Christian, belonging to the Apostolic Pentecostal movement, which favors what they describe as a literal interpretation of the Bible. She worships three times a week at the Solid Rock Apostolic Church near Morehead. Following her conversion, Davis let her hair grow long, stopped wearing makeup and jewelry, and began wearing skirts and dresses that fall below the knee, in keeping with Apostolic Pentecostal tenets regarding outward holiness and modest dress. She also held a weekly Bible study for female inmates at the local jail. In an interview in January 2016, Davis said that she believed that "we are living in end times." Davis also expressed her view that the Bible is infallible.

== Popular culture and public response ==
Davis was the subject of numerous satirical works following the burst of media attention in 2015. Books, social media profiles, and videos were created to satirize her refusal to issue marriage licenses. A Twitter account which once had more than 90,000 followers and is run by comedian Dave Colan trolled Davis with mocking tweets purporting to be from a woman who "Sits Next to Kim Davis". Funny or Die made a Mashup video featuring characters from Parks and Recreation that spoofs Davis's refusal to issue marriage licenses and parodies her meeting with Pope Francis. La Strega Entertainment created a satirical music video sung to the tune of the "Major-General's Song" from Gilbert and Sullivan's Pirates of Penzance. Saturday Night Live cast member Aidy Bryant portrayed Davis during the show's season 41 premiere. Actress Jennifer Lawrence, in the December 2015 issue of Vogue, told Jonathan Van Meter that Kim Davis is a "lady that makes me embarrassed to be from Kentucky."

In 2015, Davis' office said it received death threats by phone and email, including an ex-Marine who called saying he would attack them with a machine gun. In response, the sheriff's office took a position near the doorway of the office and Davis changed her driving routes and parking locations. She also had to change her home phone number. She later reflected "It was a very volatile time. The threats were nonstop. The lashing out and the venom spewed toward me was, I mean, I blushed just reading some of the stuff. Just think 'eww' you know. And I've received things in the mail that were ungodly." She stayed off social media and did not watch the news or any of the interviews or "read any of the stuff they wrote about me, which was some nasty stuff." She reflected, "And I just, I knew that no matter what the bad was, that the good definitely just outweighed it a thousand to one."

== Electoral history ==
2014 Democratic primary

2014 Rowan County County Clerk Democratic primary election
Party	Candidate	Votes	%
Democratic	Kim Davis	1,817	46.2%
Democratic	Elwood Caudill Jr.	1,794	45.6%
Democratic	Charlotte Combess	322	8.2%

2014 general election

2014 Rowan County County Clerk general election
Party	Candidate	Votes	%
Democratic	Kim Davis	3,909	53.2%
Republican	John C. Cox	3,444	46.8%
Democratic hold			

2018 Republican primary

2018 Rowan County County Clerk Republican primary election
Party	Candidate	Votes	%
Republican	Kim Davis	Unopposed	

2018 general election

2018 Rowan County County Clerk general election
Party	Candidate	Votes	%
Democratic	Elwood Caudill Jr.	4,210	54.14%
Republican	Kim Davis (Incumbent)	3,566	45.86%
Democratic gain from Republican			

== See also ==
- List of American politicians who switched parties in office
- Masterpiece Cakeshop v. Colorado Civil Rights Commission
- Pope Francis and LGBTQ topics
- 2009 Louisiana interracial marriage incident
- In re Neely
