= Smile, Kentucky =

Unincorporated community in Kentucky, United States

Smile
- Unincorporated community
- Location within the state of Kentucky Smile (the United States)
- Coordinates: 38°15′27″N 83°29′25″W
- Country: United States
- State: Kentucky
- County: Rowan
- Elevation: 879 ft (268 m)
- Time zone: UTC-5 (Eastern (EST))
  - Summer (DST): UTC-4 (EDT)
- GNIS feature ID: 515502

Smile is an unincorporated community located in Rowan County, Kentucky, United States. Its etymology refers to the facial expression of residents when their application for a post office had been approved.
