= Elwood Caudill Jr. =

American county clerk

Rowan County Clerk (Kentucky)
- Incumbent
- Assumed office January 2019
- Preceded by: Kim Davis

Personal details
- Born: Kentucky, United States
- Political party: Democratic
- Spouse: Trina Caudill
- Occupation: County Clerk, Property Valuation Assessor

Elwood Caudill Jr. is an American government administrator who has served as the Rowan County Clerk in Kentucky since 2019. He defeated incumbent Kim Davis in the 2018 general election, succeeding her after she gained national attention for refusing to issue marriage licenses to same-sex couples.

== Early life and career ==
Caudill worked in the Rowan County Property Valuation Office for over 20 years before being elected County Clerk. During his tenure, he specialized in measuring, sketching, and assessment of real property including residential, commercial, farm and tangible property, as well as mapping and property transfers using ArcGIS.

== Elections ==
=== 2014 Democratic primary ===
Caudill first ran for Rowan County Clerk in the 2014 Democratic primary against Kim Davis. He lost by only 23 votes.

Democratic primary for Rowan County Clerk, 2014
Party	Candidate	Votes	%	±%
Democratic	Kim Davis*	1,817	46.2	
Democratic	Elwood Caudill Jr.	1,794	45.6	
Democratic	Charlotte Combess	322	8.2	

*Incumbent

=== 2018 elections ===
==== Democratic primary ====
In May 2018, Caudill won the Democratic primary to challenge Kim Davis in the general election. In a race that drew national attention, he defeated David Ermold, a gay man who had been denied a marriage license by Davis in 2015, along with candidates Jamey Jessee and Nashia Fife. Despite Ermold's high-profile campaign and significant fundraising support from donors around the country, including celebrity donors, Caudill secured the nomination.

Democratic primary for Rowan County Clerk, 2018
Party	Candidate	Votes	%	±%
Democratic	Elwood Caudill Jr.	1,380	42.76	
Democratic	David Ermold	1,072	33.21	
Democratic	Jamey Jessee	415	12.86	
Democratic	Nashia Fife	360	11.16	

==== General election ====
In the November 2018 general election, held during the U.S. midterm elections, Caudill defeated incumbent Kim Davis with 4,210 votes (54%) to Davis's 3,566 votes (46%), a margin of 644 votes. Davis, who had switched from the Democratic Party to the Republican Party after winning in 2014, conceded the race to Caudill and congratulated him on his victory.

General election for Rowan County Clerk, 2018
Party	Candidate	Votes	%	±%
Democratic	Elwood Caudill Jr.	4,210	54.15	
Republican	Kim Davis*	3,566	45.85	

*Incumbent

The election was closely watched nationally due to Davis's controversial refusal in 2015 to issue marriage licenses to same-sex couples following the U.S. Supreme Court's decision legalizing same-sex marriage nationwide. Davis had been jailed for contempt of court for her refusal and became a prominent figure in debates over religious freedom and LGBTQ+ rights.

== County Clerk tenure ==
Caudill took office as Rowan County Clerk in January 2019. During his campaign, he pledged to serve all citizens equally, stating on his campaign website: "When I say I will faithfully execute the job of Rowan County Clerk and serve all citizens equally ... Of course that means LGBTQ+ citizens. I support every American's right to 'life, liberty, and the pursuit of happiness,' afforded them under the laws of our nation, and I do not believe our government should discriminate against anyone for being who they are."

Following his election, Caudill expressed his desire to move past the controversies of the previous administration, stating: "I want Rowan County and Morehead to get back to where it was and treat everyone equally and treat everyone with respect."

As County Clerk, Caudill's office handles vehicle registration, delinquent tax sales, elections, and record keeping for Rowan County. He has demonstrated a commitment to government administration with experience spanning multiple decades.

== Personal life ==
Caudill is married to Trina Caudill and resides in Morehead, Kentucky. He is the son of Elwood R. Caudill (1941–2022), who operated Caudill's Scrap Yard in Rowan County for more than 30 years.
