= Rodburn, Kentucky =

Unincorporated community in Kentucky, United States

Rodburn
- Unincorporated community
- Location within the state of Kentucky Rodburn (the United States)
- Coordinates: 38°11′53″N 83°24′39″W
- Country: United States
- State: Kentucky
- County: Rowan
- Elevation: 761 ft (232 m)
- Time zone: UTC-5 (Eastern (EST))
  - Summer (DST): UTC-4 (EDT)
- GNIS feature ID: 515083

Rodburn is an unincorporated community in Rowan County, in the U.S. state of Kentucky.

== History ==
Rodburn had its start in the 1870s when the Hixson-Rodburn Lumber Company built a sawmill there. A post office was established at Rodburn in 1888, and remained in operation until 1922.
