= 2009 Louisiana interracial marriage incident =

American refusal to officiate a civil wedding

In October 2009, Keith Bardwell, a Robert, Louisiana Justice of the Peace, refused to officiate the civil wedding of an interracial couple because of his personal views, in spite of a 1967 ruling by the United States Supreme Court which prohibited restrictions on interracial marriage as unconstitutional.

The story was first publicized by newswriter Don Ellzey of the Daily Star (Hammond, Louisiana). Within a day the story was on the front page of the New Orleans Times-Picayune and was circulated by the Associated Press. Bardwell has asserted that he is not a racist and that he did not prevent the couple from obtaining a license from another justice of the peace. His action was widely criticized, and many public officials in Louisiana called for his resignation. He resigned on November 3, 2009.

== Refusal ==
On October 6, an interracial couple, Beth Humphrey and Terence McKay, inquired of Bardwell, the justice of the peace for the 8th Ward of Louisiana's Tangipahoa Parish, about getting a marriage license signed. His wife Beth Bardwell reportedly told them that the justice "does not do interracial marriages". Justice Bardwell referred the couple to a justice of the peace of a neighboring ward, who performed the wedding. In an interview with Times-Picayune Bardwell falsely claimed the he had no authority to "issue" a marriage license and that he simply "recused" himself from officiating the ceremony. Later, Bardwell admitted to have refused applications to four couples over a period of 2½ years before the news of his refusals was publicized.

== Bardwell's justification ==
Bardwell justified his refusal to officiate interracial marriages as based on his concern for the children of such marriages, as he believes they are fully accepted neither by black nor white society. Bardwell said, he "came to the conclusion that most black society does not readily accept offspring of such relationships, and neither does white society", and, "I don't want to put children in a situation they didn’t bring on themselves. In my heart, I feel the children will later suffer." Bardwell asserted that he was not a racist. According to the reporter Tara Bennett, Bardwell was advised by an attorney to say that he was "busy" on days when he was requested to officiate interracial weddings, "but Bardwell refuses to lie and says [that] he will step down" if obliged to change his policy.

On October 19, Bardwell appeared on the CBS Early Show, where he was interviewed by Harry Smith. Bardwell apologized to the couple for offending them. He maintained that he did not deny the couple from being married but only recused himself from performing the ceremony. As he referred them to another justice to be married, he did not see a problem.

== Legal status of interracial marriages ==
State laws prohibiting interracial marriage were ruled unconstitutional by the Supreme Court of the United States in the 1967 case Loving v. Virginia. The American Civil Liberties Union of Louisiana (ACLU), via attorney Katie Schwartzman, cited that ruling and said that Bardwell knowingly violated judicial precedent by his action. Calling for Bardwell's removal, the ACLU requested that the Louisiana Judiciary Commission investigate the justice's conduct. The interracial couple filed a civil rights lawsuit with the United States Federal Court for the Eastern District of Louisiana, claiming their civil rights were violated. The suit named Beth Bardwell, Keith Bardwell's wife, as co-defendant and sought a monetary settlement, including restitution for emotional distress and mental anguish. Lawyer Laura Lanier Catlett filed the suit on behalf of the plaintiffs.

== Reactions ==
On the day the story broke, President Barack Obama, the son of an interracial marriage, was at nearby University of New Orleans for a much-heralded "town hall meeting" concerning local recovery from the Hurricane Katrina disaster. When asked about Bardwell's statements, Bill Quigley (Legal Director for the Center for Constitutional Rights) and White House Deputy Press Secretary Bill Burton said that they had reason to believe a biracial child could do well.

A number of state and local public officials criticized Bardwell's actions. Louisiana Governor Bobby Jindal called for Bardwell to be fired: Jindal's office released a statement calling Bardwell's refusal to officiate the civil wedding "a clear violation of constitutional rights and federal and state law" and urged that "[d]isciplinary action should be taken immediately—including the revoking of his license". In response during an interview, Bardwell pointed out that he was an elected official and that it was not a licensed position. The Daily Star editorialized that "Bardwell's personal beliefs are his own, but his responsibility as an elected official is to provide services to the public" and called on him to resign. Front-page articles in the Daily Star reported the disavowal of Bardwell by state, parish, and municipal officials and summarized the worldwide attention to the story.

Bardwell, who had another five years in what he had said would be his last term as a justice of the peace, resigned his post on November 3. Bardwell's resignation was a one-sentence statement to Louisiana Secretary of State Jay Dardenne. Bardwell offered no explicit explanation and did not immediately respond to requests for elaboration.

== Lawsuit ==
Bardwell continued to face a federal lawsuit, which in 2010 continued with the court's determination of pertinent witnesses. In November, 2010, the lawsuit was dropped by the McKays.

== Aftermath ==
In 2022, Respect for Marriage Act became law and codified interracial marriages in the United States.

== See also ==
- Anti-miscegenation laws
- Multiracial American
- Race in the United States
- Miller v. Davis
