= Miller v. Davis =

2015 US legal case on same-sex marriage license issuance

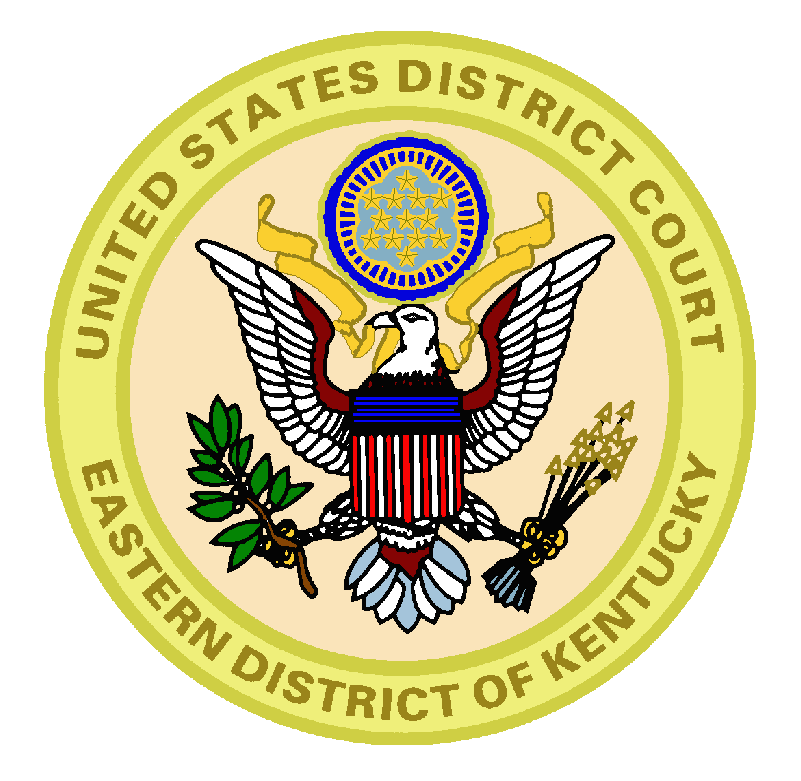
- Court: United States District Court for the Eastern District of Kentucky
- Full case name: April Miller et al. vs. Kim Davis in her individual and official capacity as Rowan County Clerk
- Decided: August 18, 2015

Case history
- Prior actions: preliminary injunction issued, defendant placed in federal custody for contempt of court

Court membership
- Judges sitting: David L. Bunning, U.S.D.J.

Keywords
- Same-sex marriage in Kentucky, U.S. Amendment 1, Establishment Clause, Free Exercise Clause

Miller v. Davis is a federal lawsuit in the United States regarding the issuance of marriage licenses to same-sex couples. After the U.S. Supreme Court legalized same-sex marriage nationwide on June 26, 2015, the county clerk of Rowan County, Kentucky, Kim Davis, refused to issue marriage licenses to any couple to avoid issuing them to same-sex couples, citing her religious beliefs. She also refused to allow her deputies to issue the licenses, as they would still bear her title and name.

On August 12, 2015, U.S. District Judge David L. Bunning ordered Davis to issue marriage licenses to all couples. He stayed his ruling until August 31, at her request, while she sought a stay pending appeal. A federal appeals court denied the stay, followed by the Supreme Court who also refused to stay the ruling. On September 3, Judge Bunning ordered Davis jailed for contempt of court until she complied with the order. Davis was released on September 8, following her deputy clerks issuing marriage licenses to the plaintiffs during her jailing. On September 14, Davis returned to work, at which point she no longer prevented her clerks from issuing licenses, though she continued to question their validity. The case was dismissed as moot on April 19, 2016.

In a subsequent lawsuit filed by the plaintiffs, Davis was ordered to pay damages and attorney fees and expenses.

== Background and District Court ==
On June 26, 2015, the Supreme Court of the United States ruled in Obergefell v. Hodges that a state may not refuse marriage licenses to same-sex couples. Kentucky had previously banned same-sex marriage by constitutional amendment, thus same-sex couples rushed to get married as soon as the decision was handed down. The county clerk of Rowan County, Kim Davis, refused to issue marriage licenses to any couple, same-sex or opposite-sex, in order to circumvent the decision.

On July 1, 2015, two same-sex couples and two opposite-sex couples represented by the American Civil Liberties Union of Kentucky filed a lawsuit in the United States District Court for the Eastern District of Kentucky against Kim Davis. The case was assigned to Judge David L. Bunning. Hearings for a preliminary injunction ordering Kim Davis to issue marriage licenses to all couples were held on July 13, and July 20. The plaintiffs contended that Obergefell mandates marriage licenses be issued to all couples across the nation, including in Rowan County. Davis contended that the First Amendment protects her from having to do so, as her religious beliefs forbid her to issue marriage licenses to same-sex couples, and thus she stopped issuing them to any couple.

On August 12, 2015, Judge Bunning issued a preliminary injunction ordering Kim Davis to issue marriage licenses to any qualified couple. He wrote that Kim Davis would suffer no irreparable harm by having her signature on a marriage license issued to a same-sex couple. On August 17, he refused to stay the ruling pending appeal, but granted a temporary stay until August 31. Davis had refused to issue any marriage licenses in the interim.

== Appeal ==
Davis immediately appealed the ruling to the United States Court of Appeals for the Sixth Circuit. On August 17, after the district court refused to stay its ruling pending appeal, Davis asked the Sixth Circuit for a stay pending appeal. On August 26, a unanimous three-judge panel of the Sixth Circuit consisting of Judges Damon J. Keith, John M. Rogers and Bernice B. Donald denied the stay pending appeal. The panel wrote that she had little to no chance to succeed on appeal on the merits of her case.

Rejection of Rowan County clerk's application for stay

Davis then turned to the Supreme Court for a stay.

On August 31, 2015, the day the temporary two-week stay issued on August 17 expired, after the clerk's office had closed, the U.S. Supreme Court, with no comment provided on dissent, declined to stay the district court's ruling in an unsigned order. This route was the last legal one Davis could seek to maintain her policy of not issuing any marriage licenses.

On September 1, 2015, the plaintiffs and other couples tried to get marriage licenses, and were declined again. Davis cited "God's authority" for her refusal, even though she was in direct defiance of the court's order. The plaintiffs immediately filed a motion to hold Davis in contempt of court.

On November 2, Davis' lawyers filed a motion asking the 6th Circuit Court of Appeals to overturn four of Bunning's decisions, calling them a "rush to judgement" that "imposed direct pressure and substantial burden on Davis, forcing her to choose between her religious beliefs and forfeiting her essential personal freedom on one hand, or abandoning those beliefs to keep her freedom on the other hand". The court denied the motion on November 5.

== Contempt of court ==
After Davis failed to comply with his order Judge Bunning ordered Davis and her staff into court for a contempt hearing on September 3 in Ashland, Kentucky. At the hearing, Judge Bunning remanded Davis into the custody of the U.S. Marshals Service for her failure to comply with his earlier order that she issue marriage licenses. "The court cannot condone the willful disobedience of its lawfully issued order," Judge Bunning said. "If you give people the opportunity to choose which orders they follow, that's what potentially causes problems." Davis was then transported to the Carter County Detention Center in Grayson.

Davis' six deputy clerks were also ordered to the hearing. Five out of six of them agreed to issue licenses after Davis' imprisonment. Nathan Davis, Kim Davis' son, refused, though the judge did not impose any penalties on him as long as he agreed not to interfere with other deputies issuing the licenses.

Due to Davis' status as an elected official, it would have been difficult to terminate her despite the contempt ruling. Davis could have been impeached and removed from office by the Kentucky General Assembly, but the General Assembly did not meet again until regular session which started January 2016. Governor Steve Beshear said on July 7, 2015, that he "will not be calling a special session on this topic", citing the compliance of a majority of clerks to the Supreme Court's decision and the cost to taxpayers.

Judge Bunning said he would revisit his decision to hold her in contempt in about a week, since by then her deputies will have issued licenses to same-sex couples in her place. Deputy clerks reopened their office in Morehead and began issuing marriage licenses on September 4.

On September 6, 2015, Davis's attorneys filed for an appeal of Judge Bunning's contempt of court ruling to the Sixth Circuit.

== Release from custody ==
On September 8, 2015, Judge Bunning issued an order lifting the contempt of court finding against Davis and ordering her immediate release from custody. In the order, Bunning barred Davis from interfering or attempting to interfere with her deputies issuing the marriage licenses. The order allowed Bunning to sanction Davis again should he determine that she had interfered or prevented her deputies from issuing marriage licenses.

On September 14, Davis returned to work at the Rowan County Clerk's office. She did not stand in the way of her deputy clerks issuing marriage licenses, and claimed she would not in the future. However, she questioned the validity of the licenses issued, as they were not issued with her permission or authority. That same day, Governor Beshear stated the licenses were validly issued and would be recognized as valid by the state.

== Case mooted ==
On December 22, 2015, newly elected governor Matt Bevin issued an executive order removing all county clerks' names from marriage licenses in Kentucky. The State of Kentucky then filed a motion with the Sixth Circuit asking the court to dismiss Davis' appeal as moot. On April 19, 2016, the Sixth Circuit granted the motion, noting the issue was now moot, and dismissed the case for lack of jurisdiction.
