= Sharkey, Kentucky =

Unincorporated community in Kentucky, United States

Sharkey
- Unincorporated community
- Location within the state of Kentucky Sharkey (the United States)
- Coordinates: 38°13′51″N 83°33′36″W
- Country: United States
- State: Kentucky
- County: Rowan
- Elevation: 1,040 ft (320 m)
- Time zone: UTC-5 (Eastern (EST))
  - Summer (DST): UTC-4 (EDT)
- GNIS feature ID: 515337

Sharkey is a small unincorporated community located at the intersection of Kentucky Routes 158 and 801 in Rowan County, Kentucky, United States.

== History ==
The local explanation for the name is derived from a cock fight. The township was on the verge of establishing a post office, which required a town name. There was a cock fight going on at the same time, so the decision was made to name the post office (and subsequently the town) after the winner of the fight. The two roosters involved were named "Sharkey" and "Shanghai", respectively. Sharkey prevailed, hence the name of the community.

== Community ==
Today, Sharkey has a single church and a single store. There are approximately 400 households, up from less than 150 in 1996. Much of the community's expansion has come from the opening of an interstate off ramp, the "Farmers-Sharkey Exit," on 801.

== See also ==
- Descriptopn KY801 and KY 1274 in Rowan County
