= Farmers, Kentucky =

Unincorporated community in Kentucky, United States

- Unincorporated community
- Location within Kentucky Location within the United States
- Coordinates: 38°08′29″N 83°32′26″W
- Country: United States
- State: Kentucky
- County: Rowan

Area
  - Total: 1.02 sq mi (2.63 km^{2})
  - Land: 1.00 sq mi (2.58 km^{2})
  - Water: 0.019 sq mi (0.05 km^{2})
- Elevation: 676 ft (206 m)

Population (2020)
  - Total: 243
  - Density: 244.1/sq mi (94.25/km^{2})
- Time zone: UTC-5 (Eastern (EST))
  - Summer (DST): UTC-4 (EDT)
- ZIP code: 40319
- Area code: 606
- GNIS feature ID: 2629615

Farmers is an unincorporated community and census-designated place in Rowan County, Kentucky, United States. As of the 2020 census, Farmers had a population of 243. Farmers has a post office with ZIP code 40319. U.S. Route 60 passes through the community.

== Demographics ==
Historical population
Census	Pop.	Note	%±
2020	243		—
U.S. Decennial Census

== American Civil War ==
Along U.S. Route 60 in Farmers is a historical plaque commemorating the passing through of Confederate General John Hunt Morgan's group "Morgan's Raiders." Engraved it reads, "On last tragic raid, the fourth into Kentucky, Morgan's Raiders took Mt. Sterling, then lost it, took Lexington and June 11, 1864 took Cynthiana. Next day USA men under Brig. General S. G. Burbridge dispersed raiders. Morgan then retreated through Flemingsburg and camped here June 12. He and his men returned to Virginia, but never recovered from this reverse."
