= Rowan County, Kentucky =

County in Kentucky, United States

- County
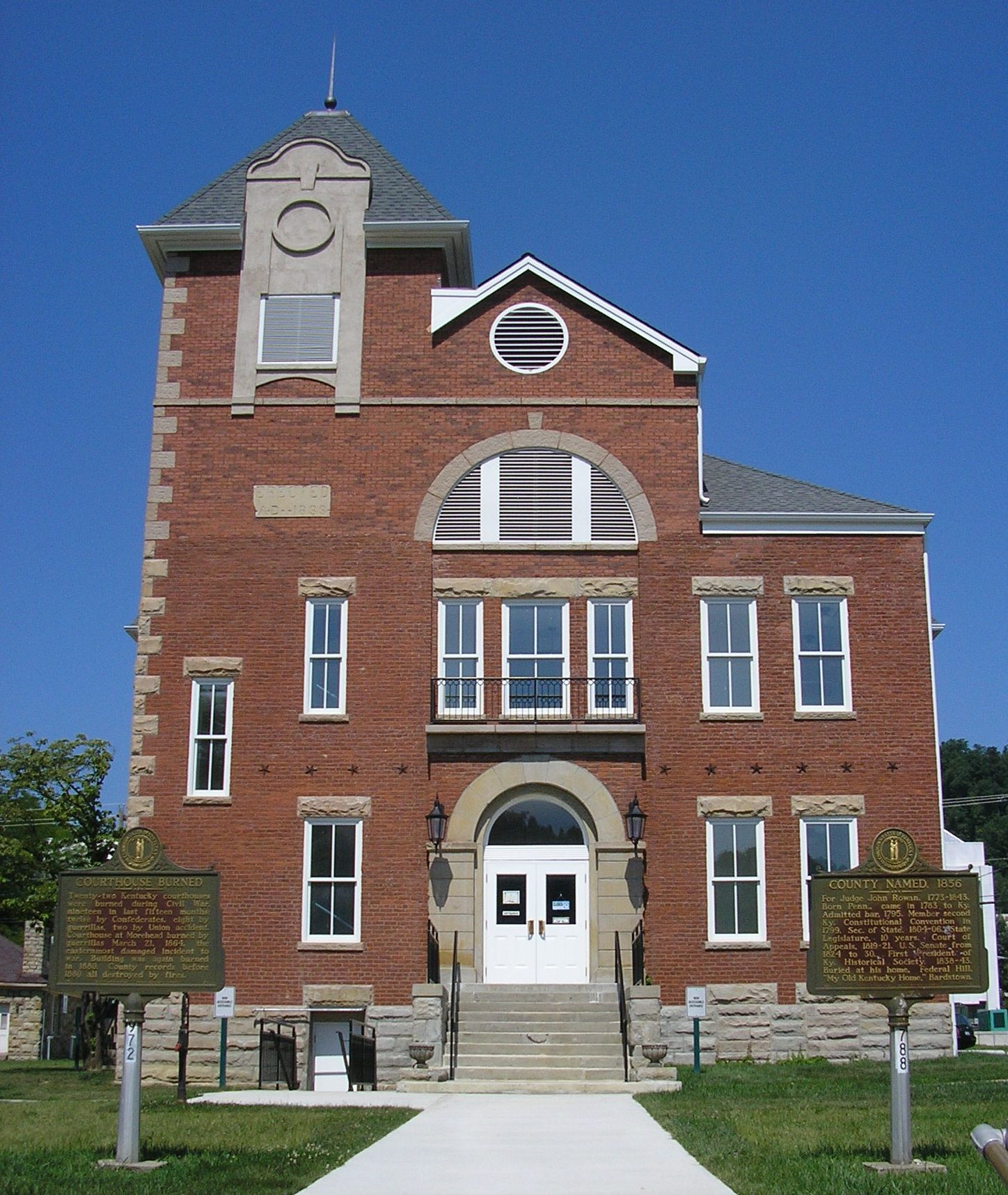
- Rowan County Arts Center (formerly Rowan County Courthouse) in Morehead

- Location within the U.S. state of Kentucky
- Coordinates: 38°11′N 83°25′W
- Country: United States
- State: Kentucky
- Founded: 1856
- Named for: John Rowan
- Seat: Morehead
- Largest city: Morehead

Government
  - Judge/Executive: Harry Clark (D)

Area
  - Total: 286 sq mi (740 km^{2})
  - Land: 280 sq mi (730 km^{2})
  - Water: 6.5 sq mi (17 km^{2}) 2.3%

Population (2020)
  - Total: 24,662
  - Estimate (2025): 24,476 ▼
  - Density: 88/sq mi (34/km^{2})
- Time zone: UTC−5 (Eastern)
  - Summer (DST): UTC−4 (EDT)
- Congressional district: 5th
- Website: https://www.rcky.us/

Rowan County is a county located in the northeastern part of the U.S. state of Kentucky, in the Eastern Kentucky Coalfield region. As of the 2020 census, the population was 24,662. Its county seat is Morehead.

The county was created in 1856 from parts of Fleming and Morgan counties, and named after John Rowan, who represented Kentucky in the House of Representatives and the Senate.

With regard to the sale of alcohol, it is classified as a moist county in which alcohol sales are prohibited, but unlike a dry county, it contains a "wet" city, Morehead, where packaged alcohol sales are allowed.

== History ==
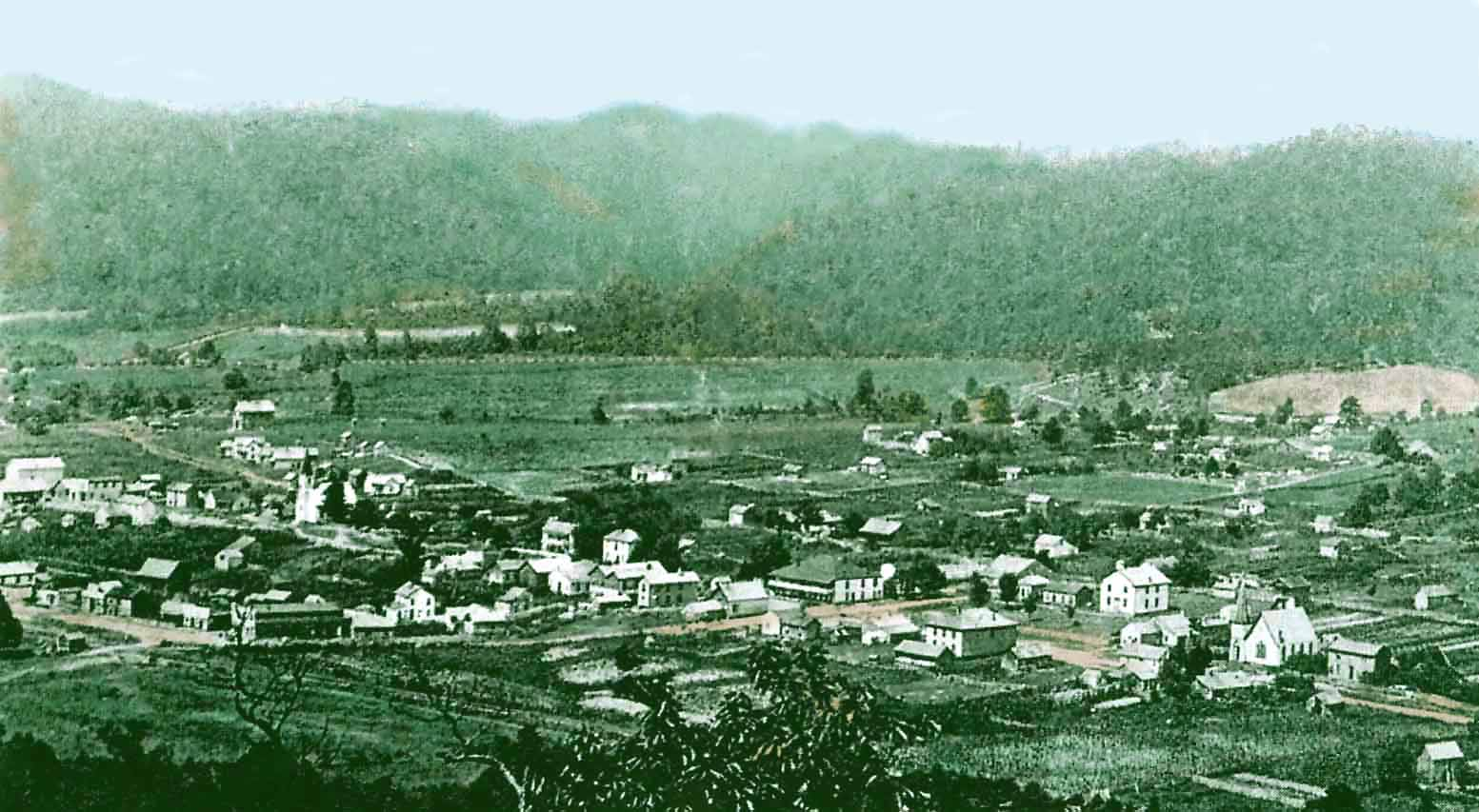
The town of Morehead in 1890

It is believed that Rowan County was first explored by those of European descent in 1773 by a party of surveyors from Pennsylvania. The first settlement was established in Farmers, a town 10 miles west of Morehead. Its population rapidly increased due its fertile farming land and proximity to water sources. Additional settlers came to Rowan County from Virginia in the late 18th century after being awarded land grants at the end of the American Revolutionary War. Clearfield was the second settlement established in the county, being colonized by a Virginia aristocrat named Dixon Clack in the early 1800s. It accommodated the first sawmill in the county.

In 1854, Morehead became the third community to be settled in the area. Colonel John Hargis founded the city after purchasing land in the county, naming it after governor James Morehead. Rowan County came into existence in May 1856, seceding from Morgan County and Fleming County. It was divided into four districts with Morehead being declared the county seat. In 1896, a tax was levied on Morehead, sourcing it with the revenue needed to construct hard surface roads. The road system was extended to Farmers by 1920. In 1961, Rowan County Senior High School was built.

In summer 2015, Rowan County attracted national attention when County Clerk Kim Davis refused, on grounds of religion, to follow a court order requiring her to issue marriage licenses to same-sex couples.

== Geography ==
According to the United States Census Bureau, the county has a total area of 286 square miles (740 km^{2}), of which 280 square miles (730 km^{2}) is land and 6.5 square miles (17 km^{2}) (2.3%) is water. Its highest point is "Limestone Knob" at about 1,409 feet (429 m) above mean sea level.

=== Adjacent counties ===
- Lewis County (north)
- Carter County (northeast)
- Elliott County (east)
- Morgan County (south)
- Menifee County (southwest)
- Bath County (west)
- Fleming County (northwest)

=== National protected area ===
- Daniel Boone National Forest (part)

== Demographics ==
Historical population
Census	Pop.	Note	%±
1860	2,282		—
1870	2,991		31.1%
1880	4,420		47.8%
1890	6,129		38.7%
1900	8,277		35.0%
1910	9,438		14.0%
1920	9,467		0.3%
1930	10,893		15.1%
1940	12,734		16.9%
1950	12,708		−0.2%
1960	12,808		0.8%
1970	17,010		32.8%
1980	19,049		12.0%
1990	20,353		6.8%
2000	22,094		8.6%
2010	23,333		5.6%
2020	24,662		5.7%
2025 (est.)	24,476	▼	−0.8%
U.S. Decennial Census; 1790–1960 1900–1990; 1990–2000 2010–2020

=== 2020 census ===
As of the 2020 census, the county had a population of 24,662. The median age was 32.7 years. 19.7% of residents were under the age of 18 and 14.6% of residents were 65 years of age or older. For every 100 females there were 93.8 males, and for every 100 females age 18 and over there were 90.2 males age 18 and over.

The racial makeup of the county was 92.9% White, 1.6% Black or African American, 0.2% American Indian and Alaska Native, 0.7% Asian, 0.0% Native Hawaiian and Pacific Islander, 1.4% from some other race, and 3.3% from two or more races. Hispanic or Latino residents of any race comprised 2.2% of the population.

38.0% of residents lived in urban areas, while 62.0% lived in rural areas.

There were 9,129 households in the county, of which 28.4% had children under the age of 18 living with them and 28.8% had a female householder with no spouse or partner present. About 30.2% of all households were made up of individuals and 11.0% had someone living alone who was 65 years of age or older.

There were 10,518 housing units, of which 13.2% were vacant. Among occupied housing units, 62.3% were owner-occupied and 37.7% were renter-occupied. The homeowner vacancy rate was 1.7% and the rental vacancy rate was 11.5%.

=== 2010 census ===
As of the census of 2010, there were 23,333 people and 7,956 households residing in the county. The population density was 83.4 per square mile (32.2/km^{2}). There were 10,102 housing units at an average density of 34 per square mile (13/km^{2}). The racial make-up was 96.1% White, 1.5% Black or African American, 0.1% Native American, 0.8% Asian, 0% Pacific Islander, and 1.0% from two or more races. 1.3% of the population were Hispanic or Latino of any race.

There were 7,956 households, of which 19.6% had children under the age of 18 living with them, 52.40% were married couples living together, 10.20% had a female householder with no husband present, and 34.20% were non-families. 27.00% of all households were made up of individuals, and 9.20% had someone living alone who was 65 years of age or older. The average household size was 2.39 and the average family size was 2.91.

The age distribution was 20.30% under the age of 18, 23.50% from 18 to 24, 25.90% from 25 to 44, 20.00% from 45 to 64, and 10.40% who were 65 years of age or older. The median age was 30 years. Both the unusually large portion of the population in the 18-to-24 range and the relatively low median age are mainly because of the presence of Morehead State University. For every 100 females there were 94.60 males. For every 100 females age 18 and over, there were 93.10 males.

The median household income was $33,081. Males had a median income of $26,777 and females $20,104. The per capita income was $13,888. About 15.90% of families and 21.30% of the population were below the poverty line, including 20.80% of those under age 18 and 16.20% of those age 65 or over.

In 2014, the county had 14,263 registered voters. Of these, 9,394 were Democrats, 3,929 were Republicans, and 626 listed themselves as members of other parties.

== Politics ==
United States presidential election results for Rowan County, Kentucky
Year	Republican		Democratic		Third party(ies)	
Year	No.	%	No.	%	No.	%
1912	417	25.23%	737	44.59%	499	30.19%
1916	941	51.17%	881	47.91%	17	0.92%
1920	1,564	54.94%	1,264	44.40%	19	0.67%
1924	1,326	53.60%	1,092	44.14%	56	2.26%
1928	1,857	61.25%	1,170	38.59%	5	0.16%
1932	1,622	36.12%	2,844	63.34%	24	0.53%
1936	1,687	45.79%	1,989	53.99%	8	0.22%
1940	1,944	45.85%	2,294	54.10%	2	0.05%
1944	1,815	48.09%	1,944	51.51%	15	0.40%
1948	1,502	41.21%	2,097	57.53%	46	1.26%
1952	1,985	47.08%	2,220	52.66%	11	0.26%
1956	2,470	50.85%	2,380	49.00%	7	0.14%
1960	2,558	51.47%	2,412	48.53%	0	0.00%
1964	1,554	35.35%	2,824	64.24%	18	0.41%
1968	2,017	45.23%	1,898	42.57%	544	12.20%
1972	3,245	59.45%	2,169	39.74%	44	0.81%
1976	2,244	38.24%	3,541	60.34%	83	1.41%
1980	2,758	46.07%	2,975	49.69%	254	4.24%
1984	3,698	57.16%	2,748	42.47%	24	0.37%
1988	3,093	50.90%	2,968	48.84%	16	0.26%
1992	2,469	33.94%	3,558	48.91%	1,247	17.14%
1996	2,309	36.63%	3,215	51.00%	780	12.37%
2000	3,546	49.07%	3,505	48.51%	175	2.42%
2004	4,063	46.67%	4,556	52.33%	87	1.00%
2008	3,907	47.92%	4,074	49.96%	173	2.12%
2012	4,035	52.64%	3,438	44.85%	192	2.50%
2016	5,174	58.48%	3,295	37.24%	379	4.28%
2020	5,994	59.55%	3,880	38.55%	191	1.90%
2024	6,224	63.04%	3,484	35.29%	165	1.67%

Rowan County used to be known as a swing county. It voted Republican in 2000, 2012, 2016, 2020, and 2024 and Democratic in 2004 and 2008, but in most of those elections the winning candidate won by small margins. Rowan County was one of four counties in Eastern Kentucky to vote for Barack Obama in 2008.

This changed in 2016 when Republican Donald Trump won the county with 58% of the vote to Democrat Hillary Clinton's 37%, the largest margin of victory since Jimmy Carter won the county in 1976. The county voted for Trump by over 20% in 2020, despite Trump losing the presidential election.

Trump won this county by a 28% margin in 2024 over Democrat Kamala Harris, the largest margin of victory since Lyndon B. Johnson won it in 1964. He became the first Republican presidential candidate to exceed 60% of the vote in this county since Herbert Hoover in 1928.

In 2015, local Democratic-turned-Republican county clerk Kim Davis became notorious for illegally refusing to issue marriage licenses. David Ermold, one of the gay men refused a marriage license by Davis, ran in the 2018 Democratic primary election to seek the nomination to unseat her. Davis was defeated in the general election by Democratic nominee Elwood Caudill, garnering only 3,566 votes (about 45.86% of the two-party vote) to Caudill's 4,210 (about 54.14%).

The county voted "No" on 2022 Kentucky Amendment 2, an anti-abortion ballot measure, by 58% to 42%, and backed Donald Trump with 60% of the vote to Joe Biden's 39% in the 2020 presidential election.

=== Elected officials ===
Elected officials as of January 3, 2025
U.S. House	Hal Rogers (R)	KY 5
Ky. Senate	Stephen West (R)	27
Ky. House	Richard White (R)	99

== Legal compliance ==
In June and July 2015, the Rowan county clerk, Kim Davis, refused several residents their right to marry, a right guaranteed by the ruling of the Supreme Court on June 26, 2015, that same-sex marriages are legal across the entirety of the United States. Privately held religious belief was given as the reason for non-compliance with the Court's ruling and with the state governor's executive order of June 26 instructing all state agencies and clerks to comply with it. After Davis took her name off the county's marriage licenses and allowed her deputies to issue them, Governor Matt Bevin issued an executive order ensuring marriage licenses without the county clerk's name on them would be recognized as valid, and the state legislature changed the law to codify Governor Bevin's executive order by 2018. After Davis lost re-election in 2018, Davis's successor, Elwood Caudill, vowed to treat everyone equally after taking an oath to uphold the law.

== Media ==
- WMKY – Morehead State University radio
- W10BM – TV
- Rowan Review – local online news
- The Trail Blazer – Morehead State University newspaper
- News Center - Morehead State University Television

== Communities ==
=== Cities ===
- Lakeview Heights
- Morehead (county seat)

=== Census-designated place ===
- Farmers

=== Other unincorporated communities ===
- Clearfield
- Cranston
- Elliottville
- Gates
- Haldeman
- Hayes Crossing
- Hilda
- Paragon
- Pelfrey
- Rodburn
- Sharkey
- Smile
- Triplett
- Wagner Corner

== Notable people ==
- Kim Davis – former Rowan County Clerk, jailed for refusing to comply with a federal court order directing her to issue marriage licenses to same-sex couples following the United States Supreme Court decision in Obergefell vs. Hodges
- Cora Wilson Stewart (1875–1958) – first woman to be elected to the position of the president of the Kentucky Education Association; opened Moonlight School, a nationwide night education program for illiterate adults

== See also ==
- National Register of Historic Places listings in Rowan County, Kentucky
