= Lakeview Heights, Kentucky =

- City
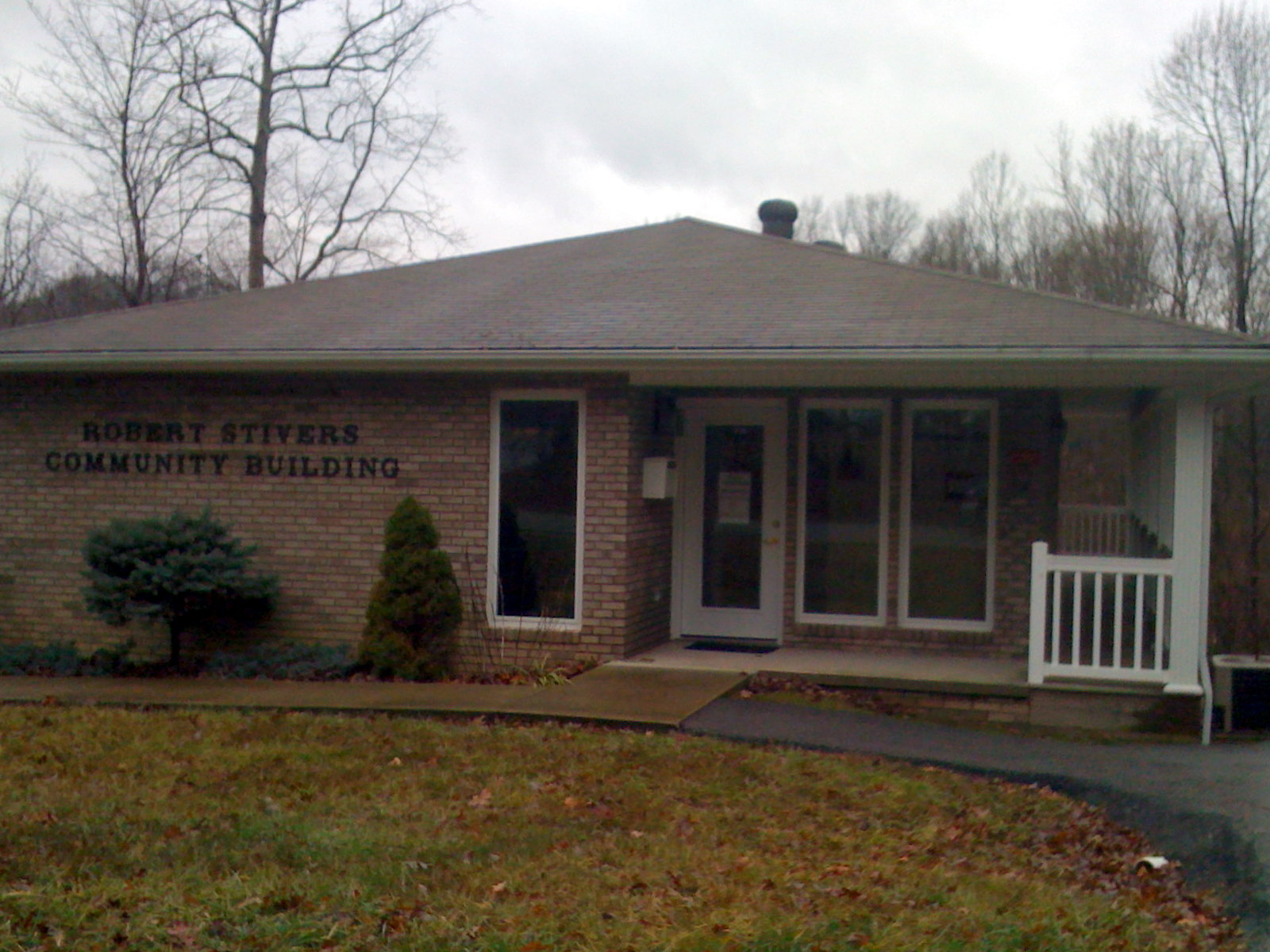
- Robert Stivers Community Building

- Location of Lakeview Heights in Rowan County, Kentucky.
- Coordinates: 38°09′07″N 83°30′16″W
- Country: United States
- State: Kentucky
- County: Rowan
- Incorporated: November 20, 1979

Government
  - Type: Mayor-commission
  - Mayor: Donald Lamb

Area
  - Total: 0.14 sq mi (0.36 km^{2})
  - Land: 0.14 sq mi (0.36 km^{2})
  - Water: 0 sq mi (0.00 km^{2})
- Elevation: 804 ft (245 m)

Population (2020)
  - Total: 277
  - Density: 1,971/sq mi (761.1/km^{2})
- Time zone: UTC-5 (Eastern (EST))
  - Summer (DST): UTC-4 (EDT)
- ZIP code: 40351
- Area code: 606
- FIPS code: 21-43668
- GNIS feature ID: 2404877
- Website: www.lakeviewheightsky.us

Lakeview Heights is a home rule-class city in Rowan County, Kentucky, in the United States. As of the 2020 census, Lakeview Heights had a population of 277.

== History ==
The city was incorporated by the state legislature on November 20, 1979.

== Geography ==
According to the United States Census Bureau, the city has a total area of 0.1 square miles (0.26 km^{2}), all land.

== Government ==
Lakeview Heights is governed by a mayor-commission form of government. Officials of Lakeview Heights are elected by a majority vote of the city's citizens. The city's current mayor is David Bolt. Mayor Bolt succeeded long-term mayor Woodrow Barber. Lakeview Heights current city commissioners are Bob Camuel, Mary Magrane, Tim Miller, and Rodney Stanley. The city government meets monthly to discuss and pass local ordinances.

== Community center ==
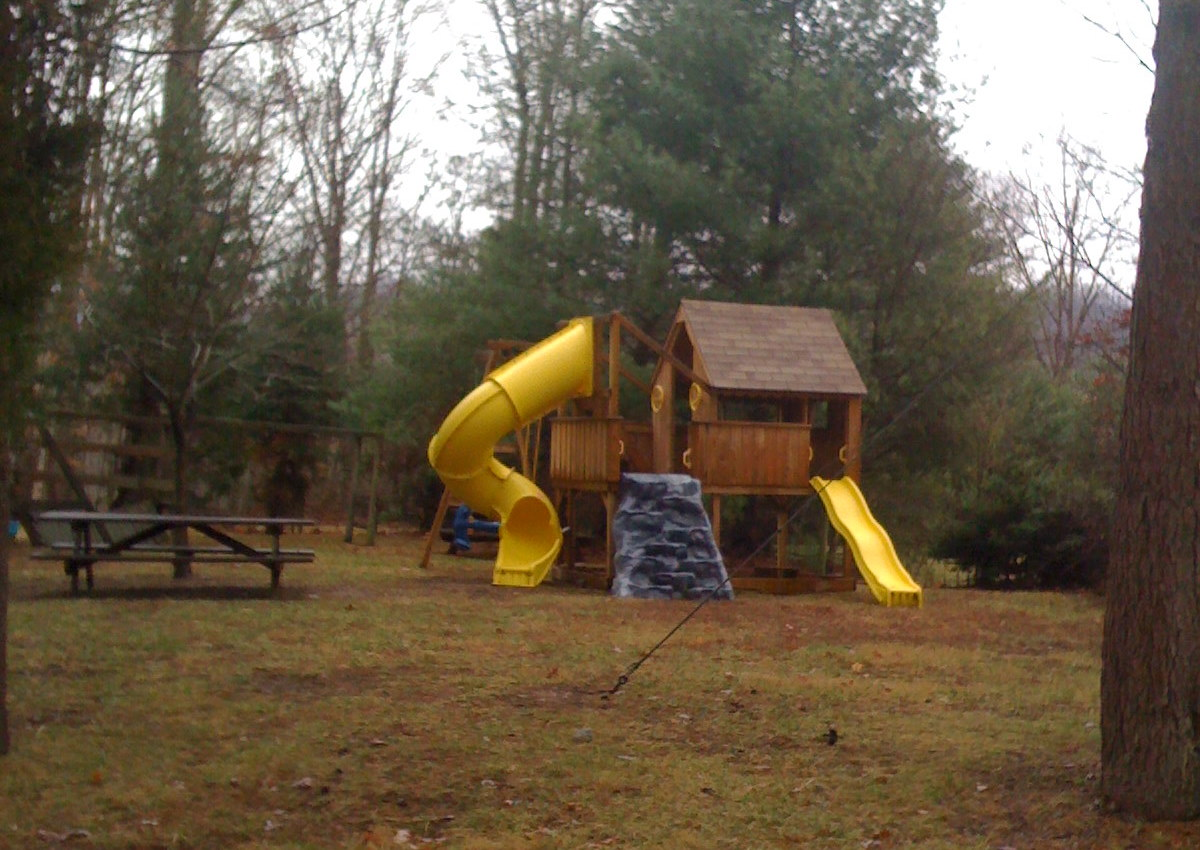
Lakeview Heights Park

Lakeview Heights has a community center located in the Robert Stivers Community Building. This building may be rented out for community and group gatherings and also serves as the meeting place for the city government. The conference room is named in honor of former Lakeview Heights mayor Woodrow Barber.

== City park ==
Lakeview Heights has its own wooded municipal park. It has park benches, slides, and a rock wall.

== Demographics ==
Historical population
Census	Pop.	Note	%±
1980	269		—
1990	252		−6.3%
2000	251		−0.4%
2010	185		−26.3%
2020	277		49.7%
U.S. Decennial Census

As of the census of 2000, there were 251 people, 99 households, and 82 families residing in the city. The population density was 1,812.2 inhabitants per square mile (699.7/km^{2}). There were 100 housing units at an average density of 722.0 per square mile (278.8/km^{2}). The racial makeup of the city was 99.20% White, and 0.80% from two or more races. Hispanic or Latino of any race were 1.59% of the population.

There were 99 households, out of which 34.3% had children under the age of 18 living with them, 72.7% were married couples living together, 11.1% had a female householder with no husband present, and 16.2% were non-families. 16.2% of all households were made up of individuals, and 8.1% had someone living alone who was 65 years of age or older. The average household size was 2.52 and the average family size was 2.80.

In the city, the population was spread out, with 23.1% under the age of 18, 4.8% from 18 to 24, 26.3% from 25 to 44, 33.9% from 45 to 64, and 12.0% who were 65 years of age or older. The median age was 43 years. For every 100 females, there were 90.2 males. For every 100 females age 18 and over, there were 82.1 males.

The median income for a household in the city was $71,875, and the median income for a family was $72,188. Males had a median income of $40,625 versus $21,250 for females. The per capita income for the city was $25,779. About 3.4% of families and 2.8% of the population were below the poverty line, including 5.8% of those under the age of eighteen and none of those 65 or over.
