= Maryland Route 675 =

Highway in Maryland

Maryland Route 675
- Maryland Route 675 highlighted in red

Route information
- Maintained by MDSHA
- Existed: 1959–present
- Tourist routes: Chesapeake Country Scenic Byway

Princess Anne
- Length: 3.39 mi (5.46 km)
- South end: US 13 south of Princess Anne
- Major intersections: MD 388 in Princess Anne; MD 362 in Princess Anne; MD 822 in Princess Anne; MD 529 in Princess Anne
- North end: US 13 north of Princess Anne

Delmar
- Length: 2.09 mi (3.36 km)
- South end: US 13 south of Delmar
- North end: Route 54 at the Delaware state line in Delmar

Location
- Country: United States
- State: Maryland
- Counties: Somerset, Wicomico

Highway system
- Maryland highway system; Interstate; US; State; Scenic Byways
← MD 674	→ MD 694

Maryland Route 675 (MD 675) is a collection of state highways in the U.S. state of Maryland. These two highways are sections of old alignment of U.S. Route 13 (US 13) in Princess Anne in Somerset County and Delmar in northern Wicomico County. MD 675 was designated after US 13 bypassed Princess Anne in the late 1950s. MD 675B was assigned several years after US 13 bypassed Delmar in the mid-1950s. MD 675A existed in Pocomoke City before it was replaced by US 13 Business in the mid-1990s.

== Route description ==
MD 675, which is known as Somerset Avenue, runs 3.39 miles (5.46 km) through Princess Anne between intersections with US 13 on the south and north sides of the town in Somerset County. MD 675B, which is signed as MD 675 as known as Bi-State Boulevard, runs 2.09 miles (3.36 km) within northern Wicomico County from US 13 north of Salisbury north to DE-MD 54 at the Delaware state line in the twin towns of Delmar, Maryland, and Delmar, Delaware.

=== Princess Anne ===
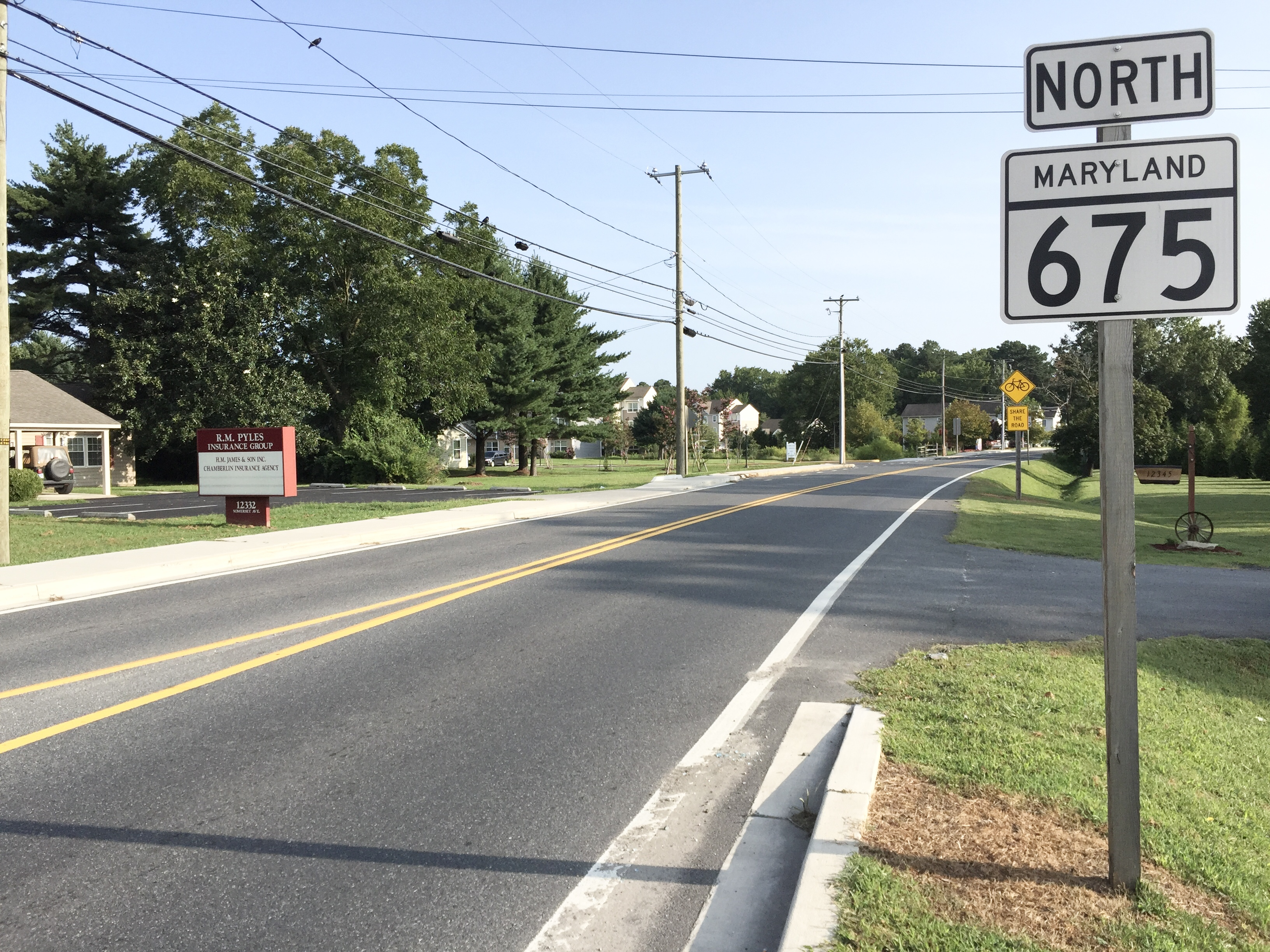
View north along MD 675 at MD 822 in Princess Anne

MD 675 begins at a directional intersection with US 13 (Ocean Highway) south of Princess Anne. The 0.07-mile (0.11 km) ramp from MD 675 south to US 13 is designated MD 675D. There is no direct access from US 13 south to MD 675 north. MD 675 heads north as a two-lane undivided road into the town of Princess Anne, closely paralleling the Delmarva Central Railroad's Delmarva Subdivision rail line through a residential area. At Park Drive, the state highway veers away from the railroad and into the Princess Anne Historic District. Within the downtown area, MD 675 intersects the western terminus of MD 388 (Antioch Avenue), Prince William Street, which leads to the Teackle Mansion and MD 363, and Dr. William P. Hytche Boulevard, which is unsigned MD 918 and heads east toward the University of Maryland Eastern Shore.

MD 675 crosses the Manokin River into a residential neighborhood that contains Manokin Presbyterian Church and the Somerset County Office Complex, reaching an intersection with the eastern terminus of MD 362 (Mt. Vernon Road). Farther north, MD 675 meets MD 822 (UMES Boulevard), which connects US 13 to the university, at a roundabout, before leaving the town limits of Princess Anne. MD 529 (Loretto Road) splits to the east before MD 675 reaches its northern terminus at ramps to and from northbound US 13 adjacent to the rail line. There is no access from MD 675 to and from southbound US 13; those movements can be completed via MD 822.

=== Delmar ===
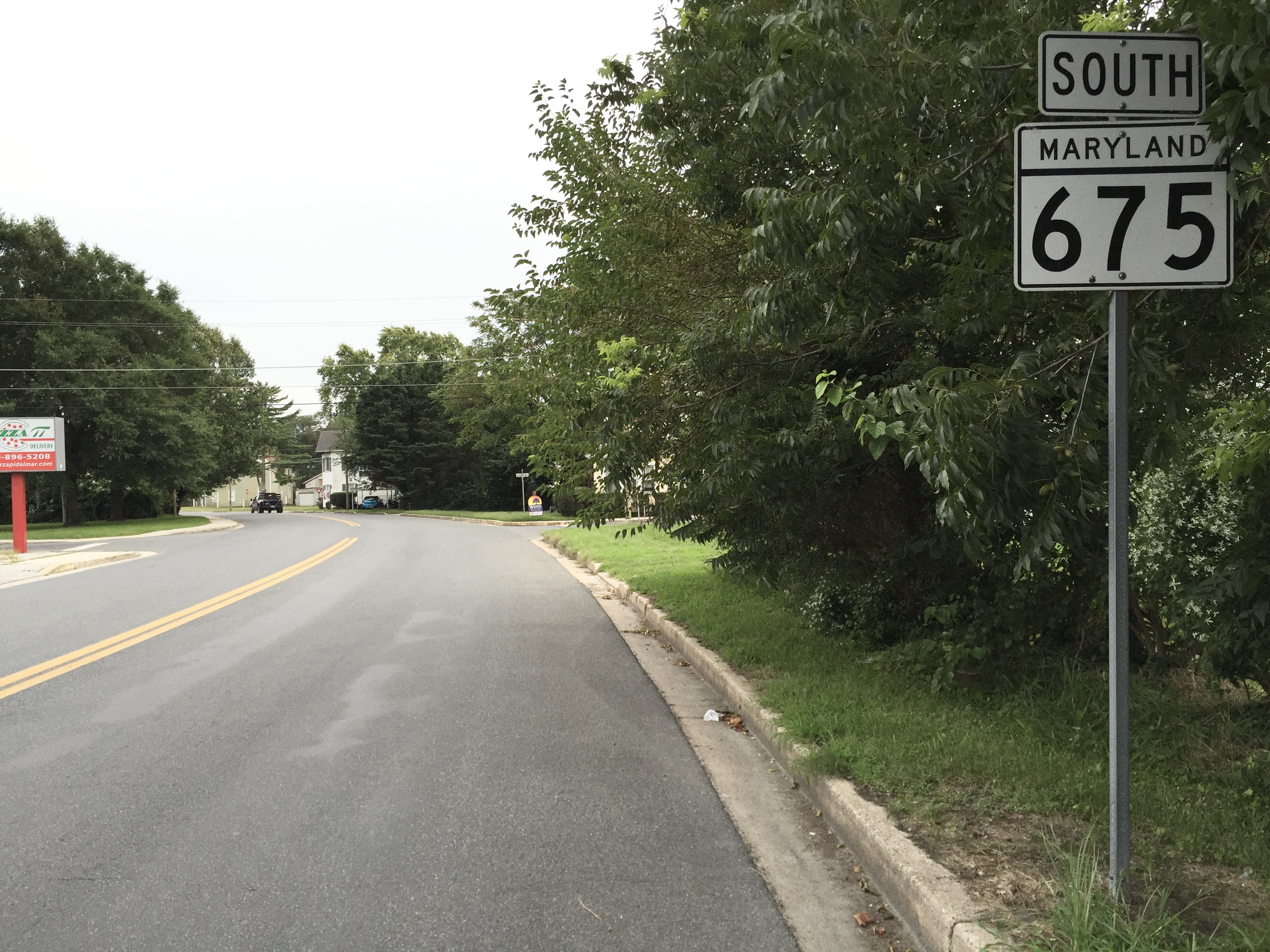
MD 675 southbound past DE-MD 54 in Delmar

MD 675B begins at an intersection with US 13 (Ocean Highway) north of Salisbury. The state highway heads west from the perpendicular intersection, then turns north onto two-lane undivided Bi-State Boulevard, passing through a mix of farmland, forest, and residences. At Walnut Street, MD 675B enters the town of Delmar, Maryland. The state highway passes through a residential area, cutting northwest through the street grid until the highway reaches its northern terminus at DE-MD 54 (East State Street), which runs atop the Delaware state line. Bi-State Boulevard continues north into the town of Delmar, Delaware.

== History ==
=== MD 675 ===
MD 675 between Park Drive—which intersects Old Princess Anne Road, the original alignment of US 13 from Princess Anne to Westover—and MD 529 is the original alignment of US 13. The state highway was paved south of downtown Princess Anne toward Westover in 1911 and north of downtown toward Salisbury in 1914. MD 675 north of MD 529 was constructed in 1933 as part of a relocation of US 13 between Princess Anne and Fruitland to bypass the circuitous route via Loretto Road and Allen Road and to eliminate two railroad crossings. MD 675 south of Park Drive was constructed as part of a similar relocation between Princess Anne and Westover in 1935. US 13's present bypass of Princess Anne was constructed between 1957 and 1959. MD 675 was marked through Princess Anne by 1978. In 2010, plans were made to construct a roundabout at the intersection of MD 675 and MD 822 in Princess Anne. The roundabout was completed in 2015.

=== MD 675A ===
MD 675A was a section of MD 675 passing through Pocomoke City in Worcester County and West Pocomoke in Somerset County. The state highway was designated after the completion of US 13's bypass of Pocomoke City around 1963. MD 675 was marked by 1975. The state highway followed what is now US 13 Business, which was assigned in 1994.

=== MD 675B ===
MD 675B is the original alignment of US 13 through Delmar. The highway was paved as a state-aid road by 1921 and rebuilt as a state road in 1923. US 13's present bypass of Delmar was completed in 1954 concurrent with the adjacent section of US 13 in Delaware bypassing Laurel and Seaford. MD 675B was part of US 13 Alternate between 1954 and 1957. MD 675B was marked through Delmar by 1983.

== Junction list ==
=== MD 675 ===
The entire route is in Princess Anne, Somerset County.

mi	km	Destinations	Notes
0.00	0.00	US 13 (Ocean Highway) – Pocomoke, Norfolk	Southern terminus; no direct access from southbound US 13 to northbound MD 675
1.32	2.12	MD 388 east (Antioch Avenue)	Western terminus of MD 388
1.61	2.59	MD 918 east (Dr. William P. Hytche Boulevard) – University of Maryland Eastern Shore	Western terminus of MD 918; MD 918 is unsigned
2.22	3.57	MD 362 west (Mt. Vernon Road) – Mount Vernon	Eastern terminus of MD 362
2.59	4.17	MD 822 (UMES Boulevard) to US 13 – University of Maryland Eastern Shore	Roundabout
2.81	4.52	MD 529 north (Loretto Road)	Southern terminus of MD 529
3.39	5.46	US 13 north (Ocean Highway) – Salisbury	Northern terminus; no direct access from northbound MD 675 to southbound US 13 or from southbound US 13 to southbound MD 675
1.000 mi = 1.609 km; 1.000 km = 0.621 mi: Incomplete access

=== MD 675B ===
The entire route is in Delmar, Wicomico County.

mi	km	Destinations	Notes
0.00	0.00	US 13 (Ocean Highway) – Salisbury	Southern terminus
2.09	3.36	Route 54 (East State Street) / Bi-State Boulevard north – Delmar, DE, Mardela Springs, MD, Gumboro, DE	Delaware state line; northern terminus
1.000 mi = 1.609 km; 1.000 km = 0.621 mi
