= Maryland Route 529 =

State highway in Maryland, United States

Maryland Route 529
- Loretto Road

Route information
- Maintained by MDSHA
- Length: 2.57 mi (4.14 km)
- Existed: 1933–present

Major junctions
- South end: MD 675 near Princess Anne
- North end: US 13 near Eden

Location
- Country: United States
- State: Maryland
- Counties: Somerset

Highway system
- Maryland highway system; Interstate; US; State; Scenic Byways
| ← MD 528 | → MD 535 |

Maryland Route 529 (MD 529) is a state highway in the U.S. state of Maryland. The state highway runs 2.57 miles (4.14 km) from MD 675 near Princess Anne north to U.S. Route 13 (US 13) near Eden in northern Somerset County. MD 529 is the old alignment of US 13. The state highway was designated from Princess Anne through Allen to Fruitland in Wicomico County when US 13 was relocated in the early 1930s. MD 529 was removed from the state highway system in segments north of its present terminus in sections in the late 1950s and early 1960s. MD 529 was redesignated along an old alignment of US 13 that had previously been MD 663 from Fruitland to Salisbury in the mid-1960s before being removed around 1981.

== Route description ==
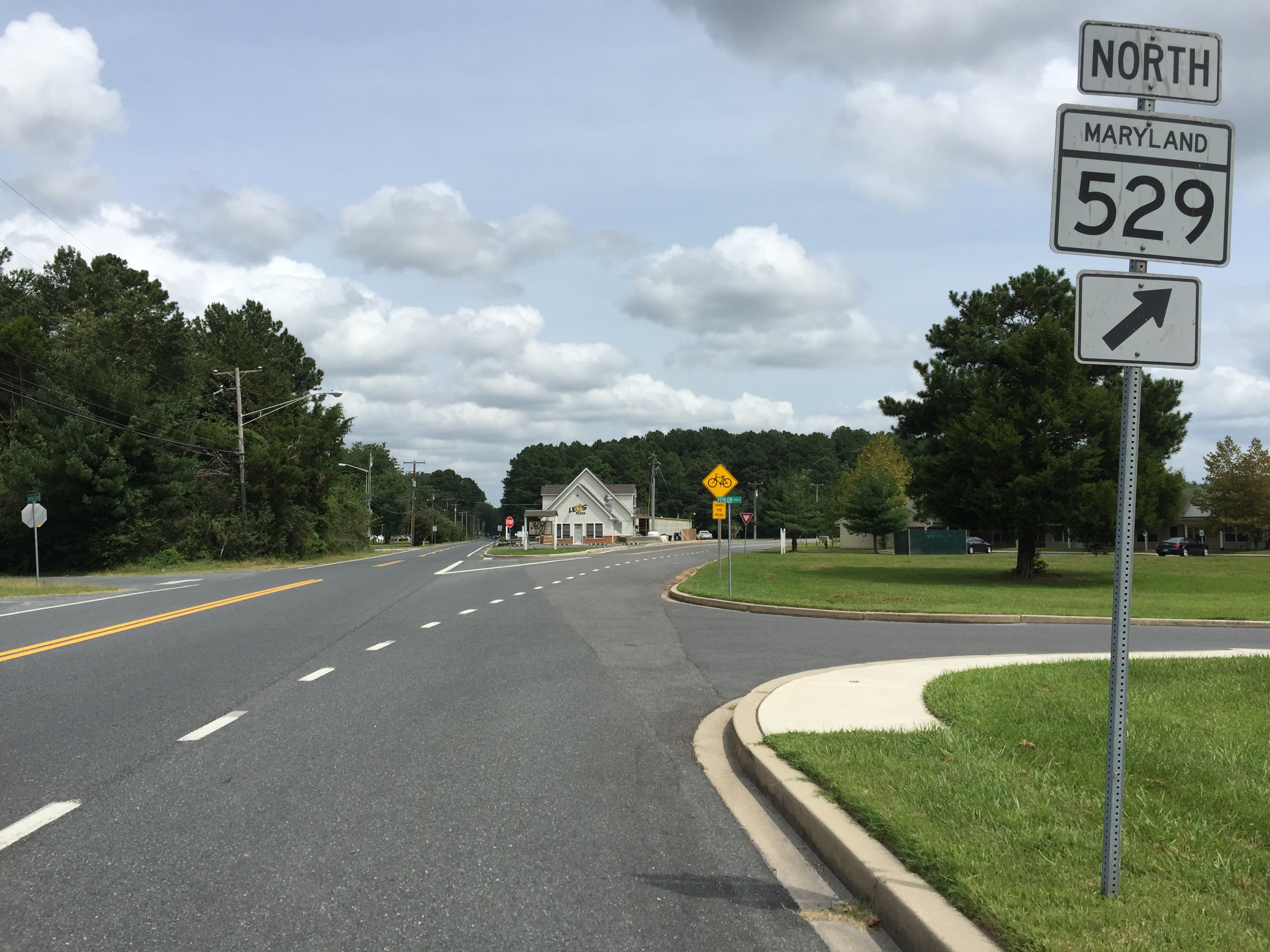
View north at the south end of MD 529 at MD 675 just north of Princess Anne

MD 529 begins at an acute intersection with MD 675 (Somerset Avenue) just north of Princess Anne. The two-lane undivided state highway curves to the east and crosses the Delmarva Central Railroad's Delmarva Subdivision rail line. MD 529 gradually curves to the north through a mix of farmland and forest. The state highway reaches its northern terminus at US 13 (Ocean Highway) immediately after crossing the railroad a second time south of Eden. The roadway continues straight as county-maintained Allen Road, which was once part of MD 529.

== History ==
MD 529 has been designated along three sections of the original alignment of US 13 from Princess Anne to Salisbury, including Loretto Road, Allen Road, and Camden Avenue. The state road on which US 13 was later designated was paved from the city limits of Salisbury to Fruitland in 1912, from Fruitland to Allen in 1913, and from Allen to Princess Anne in 1914. There remained a gap at Passerdyke Creek at the county line in Allen until a new 1,300-foot (400 m) mill dam was constructed in 1919.

US 13's first relocation occurred in 1933 between Princess Anne and Fruitland. The new highway began at MD 529's present southern terminus and paralleled the Pennsylvania Railroad until curving north to intersect Allen Road west of Fruitland. MD 529 was later marked along Loretto Road and Allen Road. The next relocation of US 13 occurred when the federal highway was moved to a new four-lane highway closely paralleling the railroad tracks through Salisbury. The section from the southern limits of Salisbury to Main Street in downtown Salisbury was completed in 1938. The segment from the southern limits of Salisbury to the first relocation south of Fruitland was completed in 1939. MD 663 was assigned to the old alignment of US 13 from the junction of the 1933 and 1939 relocations south of Fruitland north along Camden Avenue to Main Street in downtown Salisbury.

MD 663 was removed from the state highway system in 1956. The portion of MD 529 from the present northern terminus to the county line at Allen was transferred to Somerset County in 1959. MD 529 was removed from Wicomico County altogether in 1963, but by 1966 the state highway had been redesignated from the junction of Camden Avenue and Allen Road near Fruitland north to the southern city limit of Salisbury near Salisbury University. This section was transferred back to county and city maintenance around 1981, leaving only the present section of MD 529.

== Junction list ==
The entire route is in Somerset County.

| Location | mi | km | Destinations | Notes |
|---|---|---|---|---|
| Princess Anne | 0.00 | 0.00 | MD 675 (Somerset Avenue) | Southern terminus |
| Eden | 2.57 | 4.14 | US 13 (Ocean Highway) / Allen Road north – Salisbury, Pocomoke | Northern terminus |
1.000 mi = 1.609 km; 1.000 km = 0.621 mi
