= U.S. Route 13 in Maryland =

U.S. Highway in Maryland

U.S. Route 13
- US 13 highlighted in red, US 13 Bus. highlighted in green

Route information
- Maintained by MDSHA
- Length: 42.48 mi (68.36 km)
- Existed: 1926–present
- Tourist routes: Chesapeake Country Scenic Byway

Major junctions
- South end: US 13 at Virginia state line near Pocomoke City
- US 113 in Pocomoke City; MD 413 in Westover; MD 363 in Princess Anne; US 13 Bus. near Fruitland; MD 12 near Salisbury; US 50 in Salisbury; US 13 Bus. in Salisbury; Route 54 in Delmar
- North end: US 13 at Delaware state line in Delmar

Location
- Country: United States
- State: Maryland
- Counties: Worcester, Somerset, Wicomico

Highway system
- United States Numbered Highway System; List; Special; Divided; Maryland highway system; Interstate; US; State; Scenic Byways
← MD 12	→ MD 14

U.S. Route 13 (US 13) (also called Ocean Highway) is a United States Numbered Highway running from Fayetteville, North Carolina, north to Morrisville, Pennsylvania. In the U.S. state of Maryland, the route runs 42.48 miles (68.36 km) from the Virginia border south of Pocomoke City in Worcester County north to the Delaware border in Delmar, Wicomico County, where the route intersects Maryland Route 54 (MD 54)/Delaware Route 54 (DE 54), which runs along the state line. The majority of the route within Maryland is a four-lane divided highway that passes through rural areas of woodland and farmland. The route also runs through a few municipalities including Pocomoke City and Princess Anne and it bypasses Fruitland and Salisbury to the east on the Salisbury Bypass, which is a freeway. US 13 intersects many major roads including the southern terminus of US 113 in Pocomoke City, MD 413 in Westover, and MD 12 and US 50 where the route is on the Salisbury Bypass. The route shares a concurrency with US 50 along a portion of the Salisbury Bypass.

US 13 was designated through Maryland when the U.S. Numbered Highway System was established in 1926, running along existing roads. It formed a part of the Ocean Highway, a road that connected the New York City area to Florida, and still carries that name for much of its route in Maryland. Many realignments of the route occurred over the years. The route was realigned between Princess Anne and Fruitland in 1933 and between Westover and Princess Anne in 1935. Between 1938 and 1942, Salisbury Boulevard was built to carry US 13 through Salisbury; the route previously followed Camden Avenue and Division Street. In the 1950s, portions of the route were widened to a divided highway and a bypass of Delmar was built. US 13 was rerouted to bypass Princess Anne in 1959 and Pocomoke City in 1963. The remainder of US 13 in Maryland was widened into a divided highway in the 1960s. In 1973, construction began to build the limited-access Salisbury Bypass to the east of the city. US 13 was moved onto the completed Salisbury Bypass in 1981.

== Route description ==
=== Worcester and Somerset counties ===
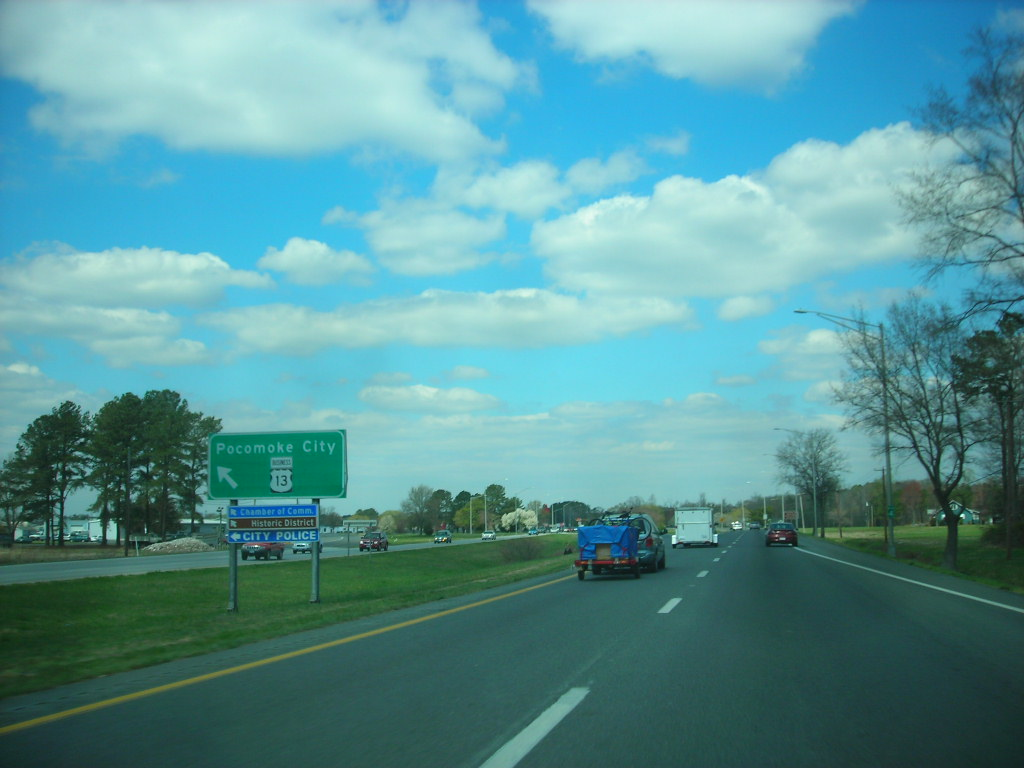
US 13 northbound at southern terminus of US 13 Bus. in Pocomoke City

Entering the state from Virginia, US 13 heads north on Ocean Highway, a four-lane divided highway that runs a short distance to the east of the Delmarva Central Railroad's Delmarva Industrial Track line. Upon entering Maryland, US 13 features a rest area and welcome center in the northbound direction, with access from the southbound direction provided by way of a U-turn at the state line. It continues north through wooded areas before heading into a mix of farmland and woodland with some residences and businesses along the road. As the road approaches Pocomoke City, more businesses start to line the road. Before entering Pocomoke City, US 13 Business (US 13 Bus.) heads northwest from US 13 on Market Street into the downtown area. Past this intersection, the road enters Pocomoke City. The route crosses MD 366 (Stockton Road), which itself has its western terminus at US 13 Bus., and continues north past a shopping center before coming to a junction with the southern terminus of US 113 (Worcester Highway) and MD 250A (Old Virginia Road) along the eastern edge of town. Continuing around the northern edge of the town, the route passes residential areas to the southwest and rural areas to the northeast before heading into a commercial district and intersecting the southern terminus of MD 756 (Old Snow Hill Road). US 13 turns west into wooded areas before crossing the Pocomoke River upstream of US 13 Bus.

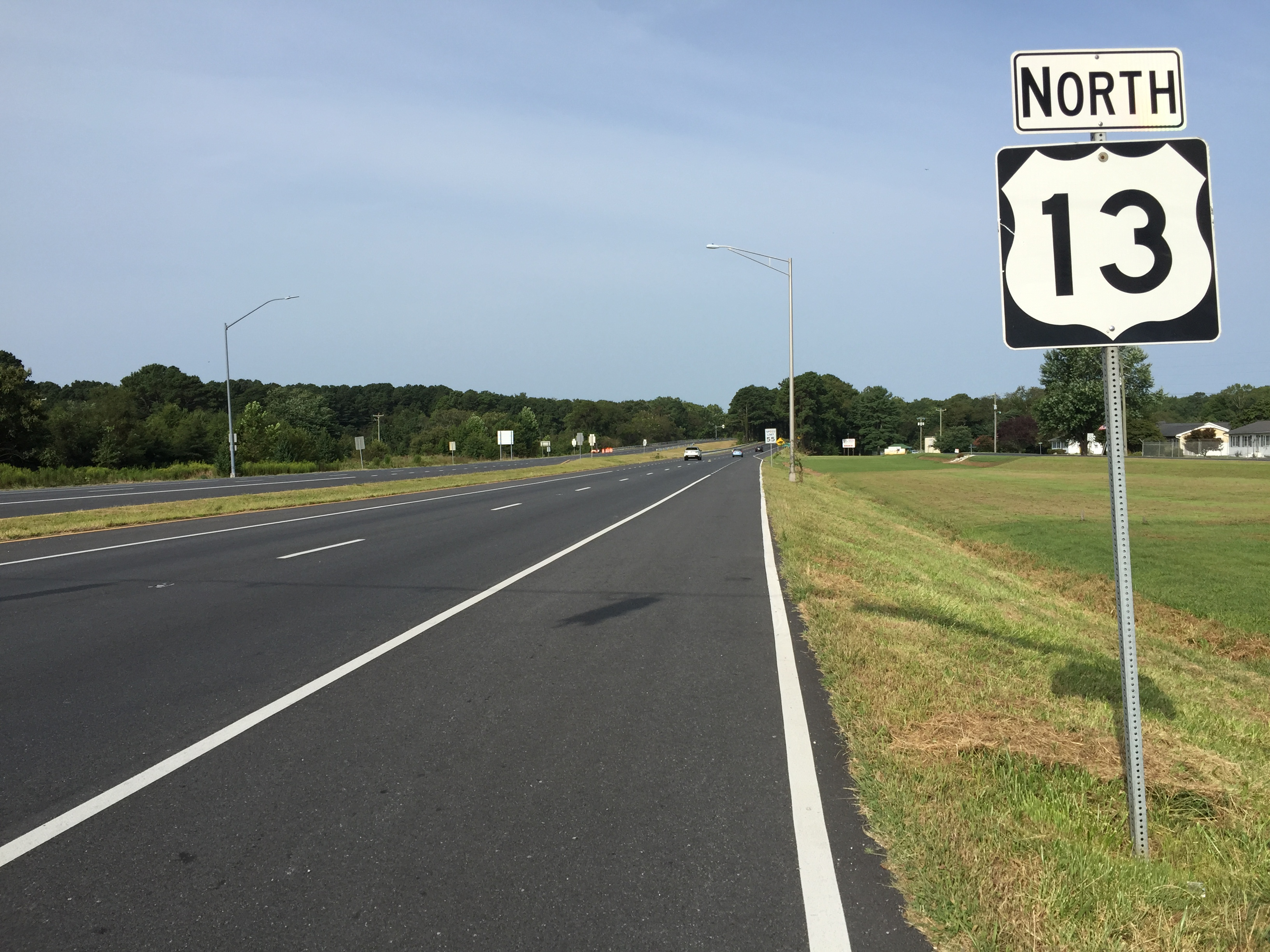
View north along US 13 at US 13 Bus. and MD 364 in West Pocomoke

Upon crossing the Pocomoke River, US 13 heads into Somerset County and intersects the northern terminus of US 13 Bus. and the southern terminus of MD 364 (Dividing Creek Road). From here, the route comes to a bridge over the Delmarva Central Railroad's Delmarva Subdivision line and curves to the northwest, running through rural countryside. It features an intersection with the eastern terminus of MD 667 (Rehobeth Road), and the route continues from farmland into heavy woodland. US 13 heads back into agricultural areas where it intersects many unsigned suffixed segments of MD 920 which are mostly short, dead-end roads. The route continues west and northwest before the median widens and it intersects the eastern terminus of MD 673 (Sam Barnes Road), which provides a connection to southbound MD 413 and Crisfield. A park-and-ride lot is located north of this intersection. Past MD 673, the median narrows and US 13 turns north to meet the northern terminus of MD 413 (Crisfield Highway), with access to that route only in the southbound direction.

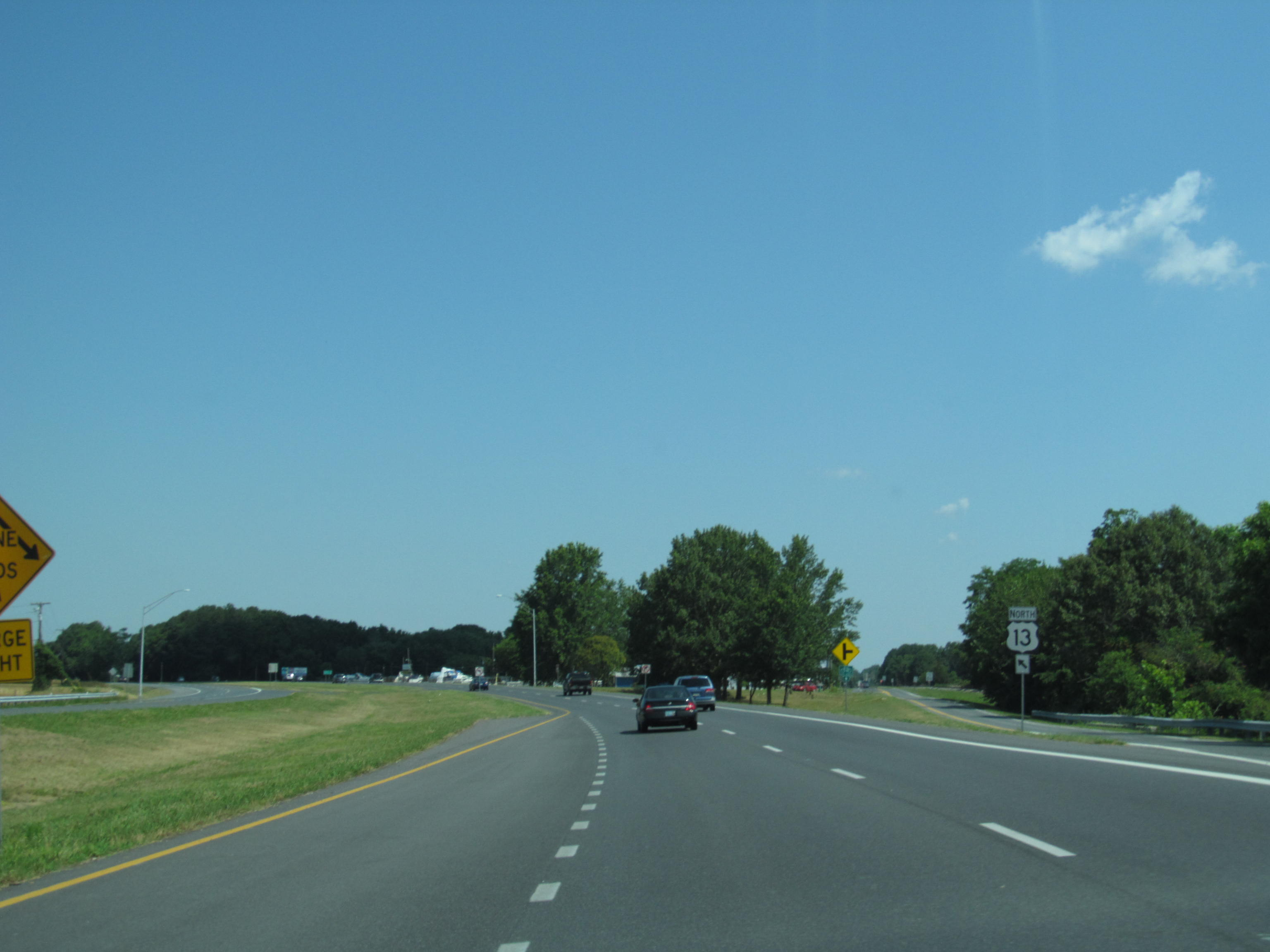
US 13 northbound at southern terminus of MD 675 in Princess Anne

Now running north-northeast, the highway heads through heavy woodland, with trees in the median. US 13 intersects the eastern terminus of MD 640 (Revells Neck Road), which heads west to serve the Eastern Correctional Institution. From here, the road heads north through a mix of woods and farms, running a short distance to the west of the Delmarva Central Railroad. It is eventually paralleled to the west by the main segment of unsigned MD 920 (Market Lane), which serves as a frontage road. Along this stretch, more development starts to line the road as it approaches Princess Anne. Farther north, the route passes to the west of Washington Academy and High School on the other side of the railroad tracks. After the northern terminus of MD 920, MD 675 heads north from US 13 into downtown Princess Anne on Somerset Avenue (US 13's original alignment through Princess Anne). The route curves northwest again as it bypasses the town.

Skirting the western edge of the town, the route intersects MD 363 (Deal Island Road/Manokin Avenue) before crossing the Manokin River. Continuing north, the route soon crosses MD 362, with a park-and-ride lot on the southwest corner of the intersection, and passes by some businesses past that intersection. The next intersection is with the western terminus of MD 822 (UMES Boulevard), which heads east to provide access to the University of Maryland Eastern Shore campus. US 13 curves northeast and exits the town, intersecting the northern terminus of MD 675 in the town's outskirts. It continues through wooded areas, again closely paralleling the Delmarva Central Railroad. US 13 reaches a junction with the northern terminus of MD 529, a rural route that heads south back to Princess Anne on Loretto Road. Past MD 529, the road continues northeast, intersecting Peggy Neck Road. From here, the highway heads through more woodland before passing through the community of Eden and continuing into open farmland.

=== Wicomico County ===
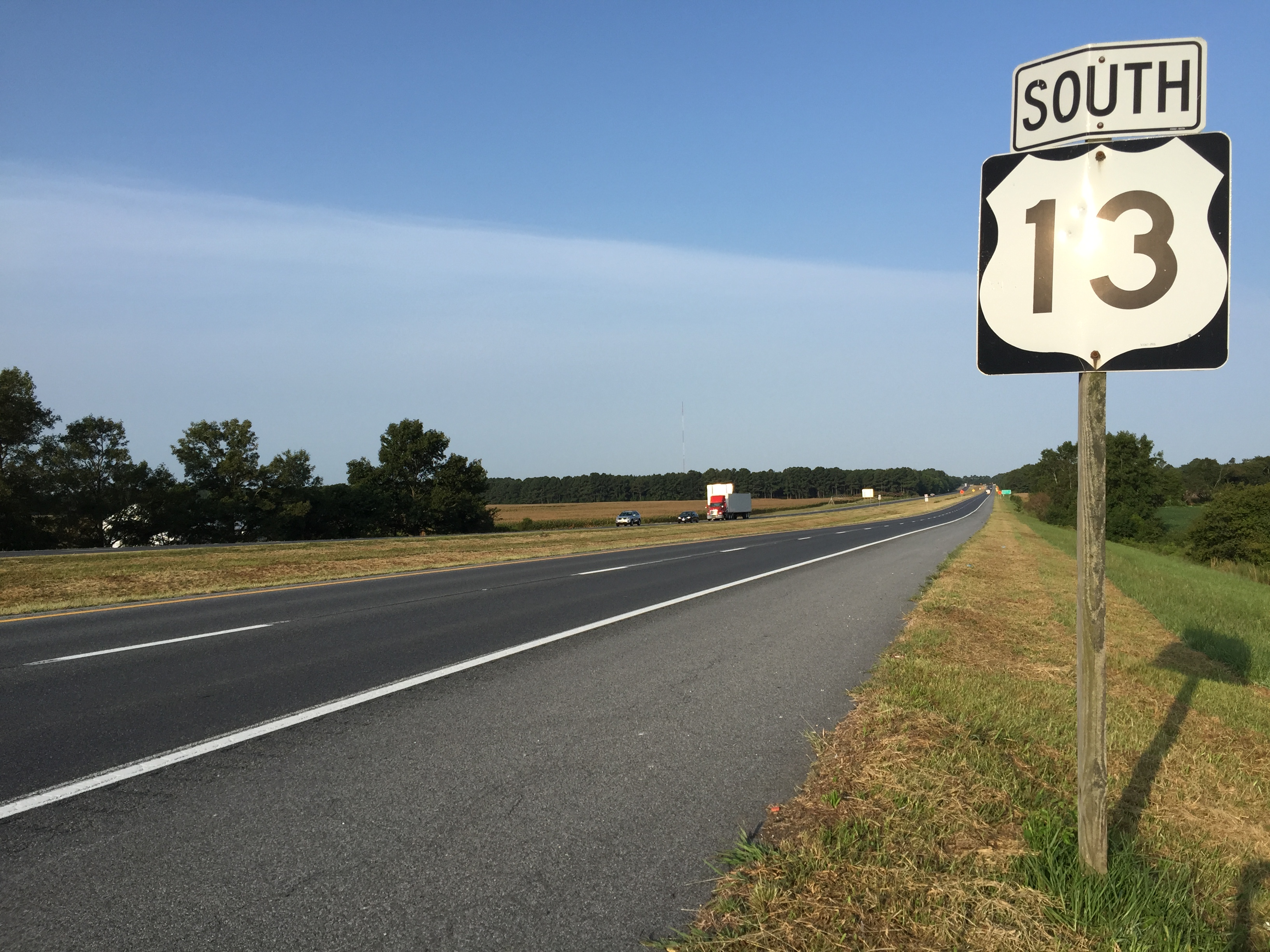
US 13 southbound on the Salisbury Bypass past the MD 513 interchange in Fruitland

US 13 crosses the Passerdyke Creek into Wicomico County, where it continues northeast as South Fruitland Boulevard through a mix of woods and farms. Shortly after entering Wicomico County, the route diverges from US 13 Bus. at a semi-directional Y interchange. US 13 Bus. continues toward Fruitland and downtown Salisbury on South Fruitland Boulevard while US 13 turns northeast and upgrades into the Salisbury Bypass, a four-lane freeway that soon passes over the Delmarva Central Railroad's Delmarva Subdivision line.

Bypassing the Salisbury area to the east, the route heads through farmland and meets MD 513 (St. Lukes Road) at a diamond interchange. MD 513 provides access from the US 13 bypass into Fruitland. Continuing northeast through a mix of farmland and woodland, with some housing developments nearby, US 13 meets MD 12 (Snow Hill Road) at a partial cloverleaf interchange. MD 12 serves as a direct link between Salisbury and Snow Hill, connecting with US 113 in Snow Hill. Turning north upon crossing Beaverdam Creek near Parker Pond, the highway crosses over MD 350 (Mt. Hermon Road) with no interchange between the routes, and continues north to another partial interchange with US 50 and the eastern terminus of US 50 Bus. to the east of Salisbury.

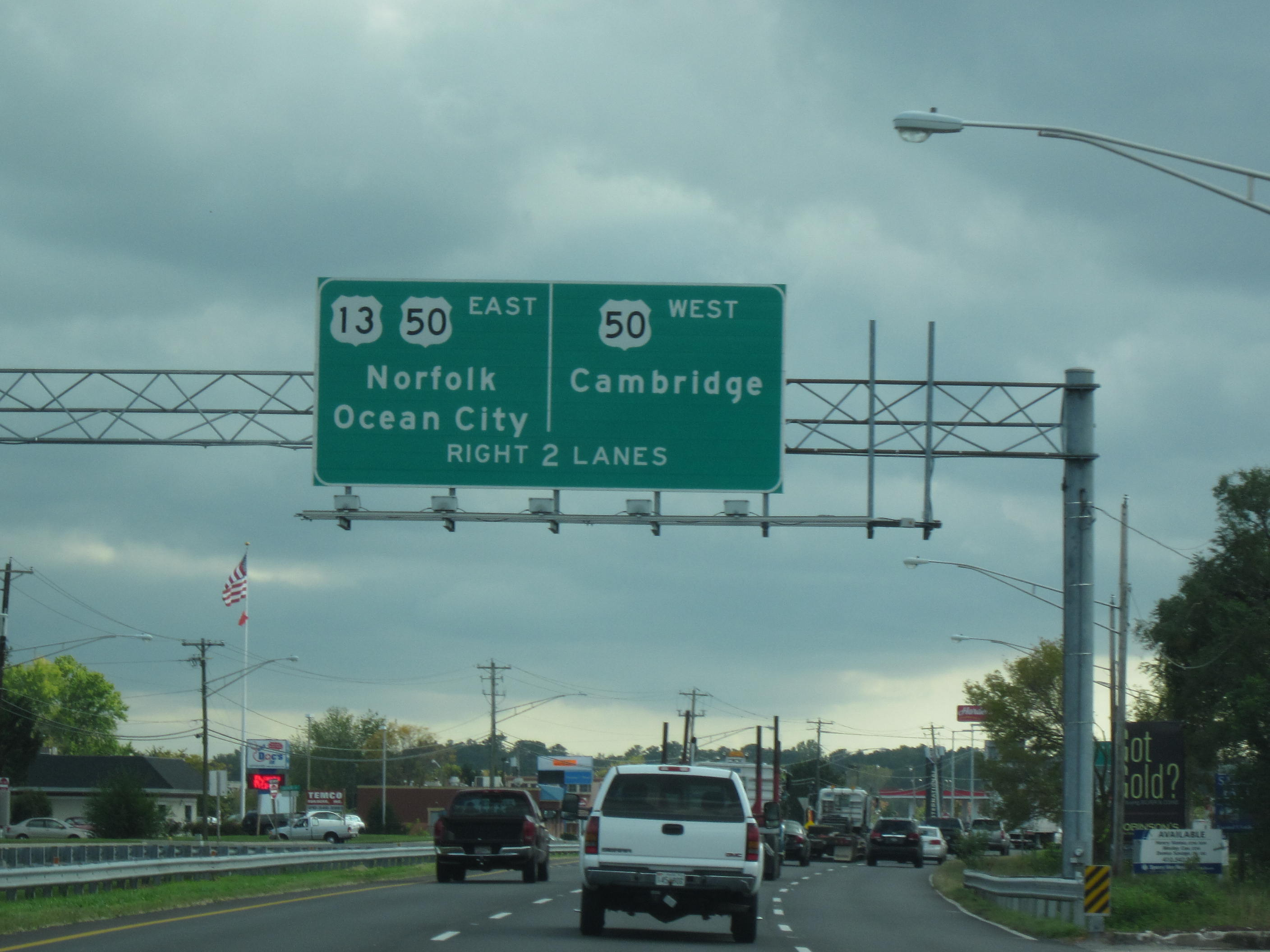
US 13 southbound approaching the interchange with US 50 and US 13 Bus. in Salisbury

The interchange between US 13, US 50, and US 50 Bus., modified from a full cloverleaf with the completion of the Salisbury Bypass west of US 13 to US 50, is the site of the eastern terminus of US 50 Bus., US 50's original route through Salisbury. US 50 joins US 13 at this interchange, and the two routes run concurrent along three miles (4.8 km) of the Salisbury Bypass. Just beyond the interchange, the road passes over MD 346 (Old Ocean City Road) with no interchange and the Delmarva Central Railroad's Willards Industrial Track line. The Salisbury Bypass turns to the west and meets the northern terminus of US 13 Bus. (North Salisbury Boulevard) at the original northern terminus of the bypass. US 13 separates from US 50 at this interchange and rejoins its original northward route, while US 50 continues west on the Salisbury Bypass to rejoin its original route northwest of Salisbury.

US 13, now known as North Salisbury Boulevard, continues north into a commercial area on a six-lane divided highway, immediately passing west of The Centre at Salisbury shopping mall. The road runs past numerous businesses before crossing Leonard Pond, as the road narrows to five lanes (with two lanes southbound and three lanes northbound), and becomes Ocean Highway again. It heads to east of the Wicomico County Tourist Information Center and passes by a set of weigh stations located on both sides of the road before it intersects the southern terminus of a separate MD 675, which follows US 13's original route through Delmar on Bi-State Boulevard. US 13 continues north as a four-lane highway (with two lanes in each direction), through a mix of farms and woods with some businesses, skirting Delmar to the east. The route intersects MD 54/DE 54 (Maryland Delaware Line Road), which runs along the Delaware–Maryland state line, and US 13 continues north into Delaware.

== History ==
The original north–south highway through Fruitland and Salisbury followed Allen Road north from Allen on Wicomico County's border with Somerset County to near the present intersection of Division Street and Camden Avenue on the west side of Fruitland. Division Street continued east to pass through the center of Fruitland before heading north to Salisbury, while Camden Avenue bypassed Fruitland to the west and headed directly toward Salisbury. The two roads reunited in downtown Salisbury just south of Main Street. Division Street continued north out of Salisbury toward Delmar. When the Maryland State Roads Commission (SRC) designated a state road system in 1909, the highway between Allen and Salisbury using Camden Avenue was designated a state road. In 1911, the road between Westover and Princess Anne was completed as a state highway while the portion between Salisbury and south of Delmar was completed as a state-aid road. At this time, the road between Pocomoke City and Salisbury was proposed as a state road. The state road was completed from the southern limit of Salisbury to Main Street in Fruitland in 1912 and from there to Allen in 1913. In 1914, the state highway between Princess Anne and Allen was completed. The highway between the Virginia border through Pocomoke City to Westover and between Salisbury and Delmar was completed by 1921.

Ocean Highway sign used along US 13

With the creation of the U.S. Numbered Highway System on November 11, 1926, US 13 was designated through Maryland from the Virginia border south of Pocomoke City north to the Delaware border in Delmar. The route headed north to Pocomoke City, northwest to Westover, north to Princess Anne, northeast to Fruitland and Salisbury, and north to Delmar. The entire route of US 13 in Maryland became part of the Ocean Highway, an Atlantic coastal highway stretching from Jacksonville, Florida, to New Brunswick, New Jersey, that served as the quickest route between the New York City area and Florida before the introduction of the Interstate Highway System. US 13 is one of only four U.S. Highways that form the highway and Maryland was one of the states that participated in the highway's formation.

In 1930, US 13 along Division Street north of downtown Salisbury was placed on an overpass over the New York, Philadelphia and Norfolk Railroad (now the Delmarva Central Railroad's Delmarva Subdivision). US 13 was relocated between Princess Anne and Fruitland in 1933 to bypass the circuitous route via Loretto Road and Allen Road and to eliminate two railroad crossings, running parallel to the Pennsylvania Railroad (now the Delmarva Central Railroad's Delmarva Subdivision) on a straight alignment. The former alignment became MD 529 in 1939. US 13 was relocated between Princess Anne and Westover in 1935, bypassing what is now known as Old Princess Anne Road. This former alignment became MD 598 in 1939 and was removed from the state highway system by 1961. The first portion of the first Salisbury Bypass, now named Salisbury Boulevard, was completed in 1938 between College Avenue and Main Street in Salisbury. The second segment, between the present intersection of US 13 Bus. and Camden Avenue south of Fruitland and College Avenue, was completed in 1939. Upon completion of the first two sections, US 13 was moved to the bypass and Camden Avenue was designated MD 663. The third and final section, from Main Street to Zion Road on the north side of Salisbury, was completed by 1942. After US 13 moved to the new highway, Division Street north of Main Street was designated MD 475. By 1946, US 13 was realigned to a straighter alignment to the south of Pocomoke City, with the former alignment along Old Virginia Road becoming MD 250. In 1949, US 13 was rerouted to bypass Costen on a straight alignment to the southwest, with the former route through Costen becoming MD 673.

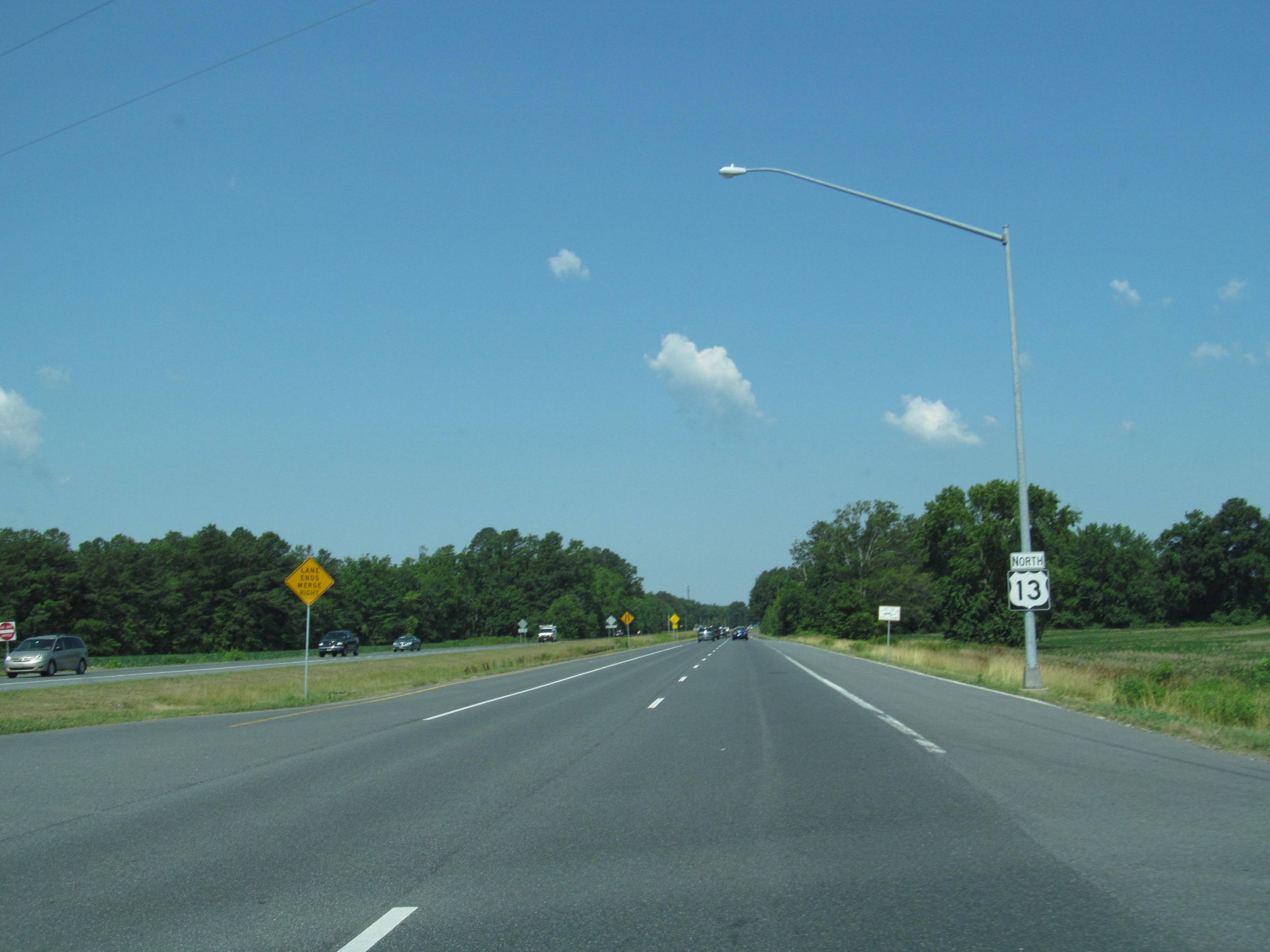
US 13 northbound near Westover

In 1951, a second bridge over the railroad was completed in north Salisbury and US 13 north of Zion Road was relocated and expanded to a divided highway. US 13's present divided highway bypass of Delmar was completed in 1954 concurrent with the adjacent section of the route in Delaware bypassing Laurel and Seaford. The former alignment through Delmar was designated as US 13 Alternate between 1954 and 1957 and became MD 675 by 1983. US 13 from Princess Anne to College Avenue in Salisbury was also dualized between 1954 and 1956. In 1957, US 13 was widened into a divided highway between the Virginia border and Pocomoke City. US 13's bypass of Princess Anne was constructed between 1957 and 1959. MD 675 was marked on the former alignment through Princess Anne by 1978. In 1963, US 13 was rerouted to bypass Pocomoke City to the northeast, with the former alignment through Pocomoke City becoming MD 675, which was replaced by US 13 Bus. in 1994. US 13 was expanded to a divided highway from the southern end of the Princess Anne bypass south past Kings Creek in 1962, south through Westover in 1963, and south to about two miles (3.2 km) north of MD 667 in 1964. The Princess Anne bypass was expanded to a divided highway in 1965. US 13's expansion to a four-lane highway in Maryland was completed in 1966 when the federal highway was expanded to a divided highway from north of MD 667 south past West Pocomoke to the southern end of the Pocomoke City bypass.

The next major upgrade to US 13 was the construction of the limited-access Salisbury Bypass beginning from the northern end around 1973. The Salisbury Bypass was completed south to MD 12, including the interchange with US 50, in 1975. The US 13 portion of the bypass was completed in 1981; US 13 Bus. was assigned to the bypassed highway through Fruitland and Salisbury by 1983. The interchange at the northern end of US 13's part of the Salisbury Bypass had several ramps added during the extension of the bypass west to US 50 between 2000 and 2002, which was completed on October 19, 2002, six months before it was originally planned to open. The extension of the bypass resulted in US 50 running concurrent with US 13 to the northeast of the city. This concurrent section features separate milemarkers for both US 13 and US 50, with shields on the milemarkers to differentiate between the two routes.

== Junction list ==
County	Location	mi	km	Destinations	Notes
Worcester		0.00	0.00	US 13 south (Lankford Highway) – Norfolk	Virginia state line
Worcester	Pocomoke City	3.91	6.29	US 13 Bus. north (Market Street) – Pocomoke City	Southern terminus of US 13 Bus.; former US 13; access from northbound US 13 to US 13 Bus. and from US 13 Bus. to southbound US 13
Worcester	Pocomoke City	4.23	6.81	MD 366 (Stockton Road) – Stockton	
Worcester	Pocomoke City	4.55	7.32	US 113 north (Worcester Highway) / MD 250A south (Old Virginia Road) – Snow Hill, Berlin, Ocean City, Pocomoke City	Southern terminus of US 113; MD 250A is unsigned
Worcester	Pocomoke City	5.44	8.75	MD 756 north (Old Snow Hill Road)	Southern terminus of MD 756; former US 113
Somerset	West Pocomoke	6.57	10.57	US 13 Bus. south (Market Street) / MD 364 north (Dividing Creek Road) – Pocomoke City, Pocomoke River State Park	Northern terminus of US 13 Bus.; southern terminus of MD 364; former US 13
Somerset	Costen	8.41	13.53	MD 667 west (Rehobeth Road) – Rehobeth, Marion, Crisfield	Eastern terminus of MD 667
Somerset	Westover	14.18	22.82	MD 673 west (Sam Barnes Road) to MD 413 – Westover, Crisfield	Eastern terminus of MD 673; northbound access to MD 413
Somerset	Westover	14.77	23.77	MD 413 south (Crisfield Highway) – Crisfield	Northern terminus of MD 413; no access from northbound US 13 to MD 413
Somerset	Westover	16.04	25.81	MD 640 west (Revells Neck Road) – Eastern Correctional Institution	Eastern terminus of MD 640
Somerset	King's Creek	17.12	27.55	MD 920 north (Market Lane)	Southern terminus of MD 920; frontage road
Somerset	King's Creek	18.08	29.10	MD 920 south (Market Lane)	Northern terminus of MD 920; frontage road
Somerset	Princess Anne	18.18	29.26	MD 675 north (Somerset Avenue) – Princess Anne Town Center	Southern terminus of MD 675; former US 13; no access from southbound US 13 to MD 675
Somerset	Princess Anne	19.73	31.75	MD 363 (Deal Island Road/Manokin Avenue) – Princess Anne, Deal Island	
Somerset	Princess Anne	20.45	32.91	MD 362 (Mount Vernon Road) – Princess Anne, Mount Vernon, Whitehaven Ferry	
Somerset	Princess Anne	20.88	33.60	MD 822 east (UMES Boulevard) – University of Maryland Eastern Shore	Western terminus of MD 822
Somerset	Princess Anne	21.73	34.97	MD 675 south (Somerset Avenue)	Northern terminus of MD 675; former US 13; access to and from the northbound direction of US 13 only
Somerset	Princess Anne	23.23	37.39	MD 529 south (Loretto Road)	Northern terminus of MD 529; former US 13
Wicomico	Fruitland	27.42	44.13	South end of freeway	
Wicomico	Fruitland	27.42	44.13	US 13 Bus. north (Fruitland Boulevard) – Fruitland, Salisbury	Northbound exit, southbound entrance; southern terminus of US 13 Bus.; former US 13
Wicomico	Fruitland	29.32	47.19	MD 513 (Cedar Lane) / St. Lukes Road – Fruitland	
Wicomico	Salisbury	31.94	51.40	MD 12 (Snow Hill Road) – Salisbury, Snow Hill	
Wicomico	Salisbury	35.33	56.86	US 50 east (Ocean Gateway) / US 50 Bus. west (Salisbury Parkway) – Ocean City, Salisbury	South end of US 50 overlap; eastern terminus of US 50 Bus.; US 13 northbound has access to Hobbs Road
Wicomico	Salisbury	38.42	61.83	US 50 west (Salisbury Bypass) – Cambridge, Bay Bridge US 13 Bus. south (Salisbury Boulevard) – Salisbury	North end of US 50 overlap; northern terminus of US 13 Bus.; former US 13
Wicomico	Salisbury	38.42	61.83	North end of freeway	
Wicomico	Salisbury	40.60	65.34	MD 675 north (Bi-State Boulevard) – Delmar	Southern terminus of MD 675; former US 13
Wicomico	Delmar	42.48	68.36	Route 54 (Line Road) – Delmar, Gumboro US 13 north (Sussex Highway) – Dover	Delaware state line
1.000 mi = 1.609 km; 1.000 km = 0.621 mi: Concurrency terminus; Incomplete access

== Special routes ==
=== Pocomoke City business route ===
U.S. Route 13 Business
- Location: Pocomoke City
- Length: 2.48 mi (3.99 km)
- Existed: 1994–present

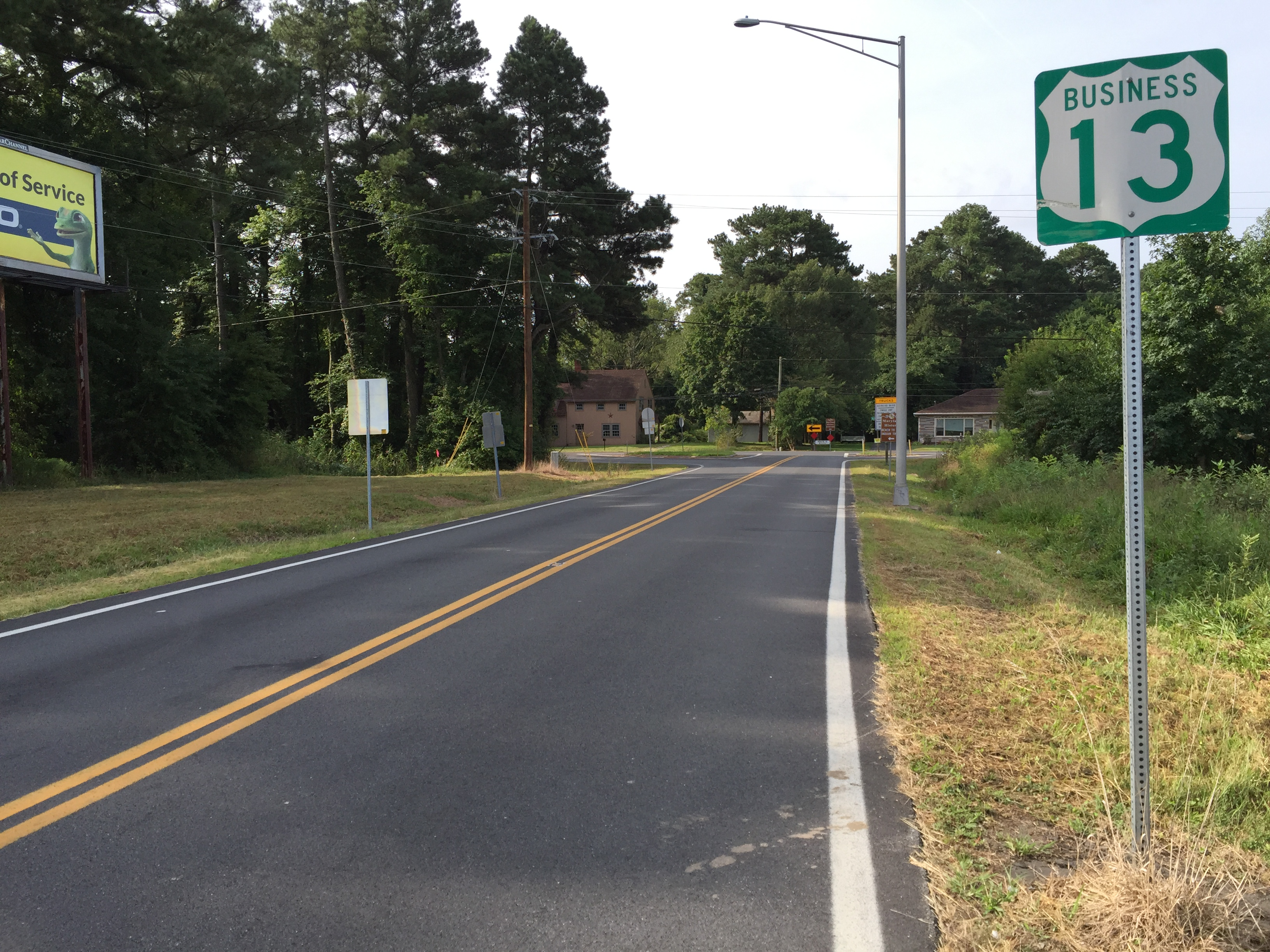
View south along US 13 Bus. past its northern terminus at US 13 just north of Pocomoke City

U.S. Route 13 Business (US 13 Bus.) is a business route of US 13 that passes through Pocomoke City in Worcester and Somerset counties in Maryland. The route begins south of Pocomoke City; US 13's four-lane divided mainline curves away to the right around the town, while US 13 Bus. continues straight ahead as a two-lane town street. After intersecting MD 366, the route connects with the original southern terminus of US 113, the latter having been rolled back to terminate at mainline US 13. For a time, the marooned segment was part of MD 250 but is now designated MD 250A. Continuing north, the route heads toward the city waterfront and business district. The route soon reaches the Pocomoke River, crossing it on a drawbridge. After crossing the river, the route heads out of town into rural surroundings before terminating on US 13 at the southern terminus of MD 364. The route is the former alignment of US 13 that was bypassed in 1963. The route was designated as MD 675 and was replaced by US 13 Bus. in 1994.

=== Salisbury business route ===
U.S. Route 13 Business
- Location: Fruitland–Salisbury
- Length: 8.14 mi (13.10 km)
- Existed: 1982–present

U.S. Route 13 Business (US 13 Bus.) is a business route of US 13 in the U.S. state of Maryland. The highway runs 8.14 miles (13.10 km) between US 13 south of Fruitland and US 13 and US 50 on the north side of Salisbury. US 13 Bus. is a four-lane highway with divided and undivided sections that provides access to downtown Salisbury, where the highway intersects US 50 Bus., Salisbury University, and Fruitland, where the highway meets MD 513. US 13 Bus. was constructed as a new alignment of US 13 in several steps in the 1930s and early 1940s. The section of the highway through Salisbury was originally constructed with four lanes, while the portion of the highway through Fruitland and at the northern end was expanded to a divided highway in the first half of the 1950s. US 13 Bus. was designated when US 13 was moved to the Salisbury Bypass upon its completion in 1982.

== See also ==
U.S. Route 13
Previous state: Virginia	Maryland	Next state: Delaware
