= Maryland Route 362 =

State highway in Maryland, United States

Maryland Route 362
- Mount Vernon Road
- Maryland Route 362 highlighted in red

Route information
- Maintained by MDSHA
- Length: 6.23 mi (10.03 km)
- Existed: 1929–present
- Tourist routes: Chesapeake Country Scenic Byway

Major junctions
- West end: Bobtown Road near Mount Vernon
- US 13 in Princess Anne
- East end: MD 675 in Princess Anne

Location
- Country: United States
- State: Maryland
- Counties: Somerset

Highway system
- Maryland highway system; Interstate; US; State; Scenic Byways
← MD 361	→ MD 363

Maryland Route 362 (MD 362) is a state highway in the U.S. state of Maryland. Known as Mount Vernon Road, the state highway runs 6.23 miles (10.03 km) from Bobtown Road near Mount Vernon east to MD 675 in Princess Anne. MD 362 connects Princess Anne with northwestern Somerset County as well as southwestern Wicomico County via the Whitehaven Ferry. The state highway was constructed from U.S. Route 13 (US 13, now MD 675) beginning in 1929. MD 363 was completed to Mount Vernon in the late 1930s.

== Route description ==
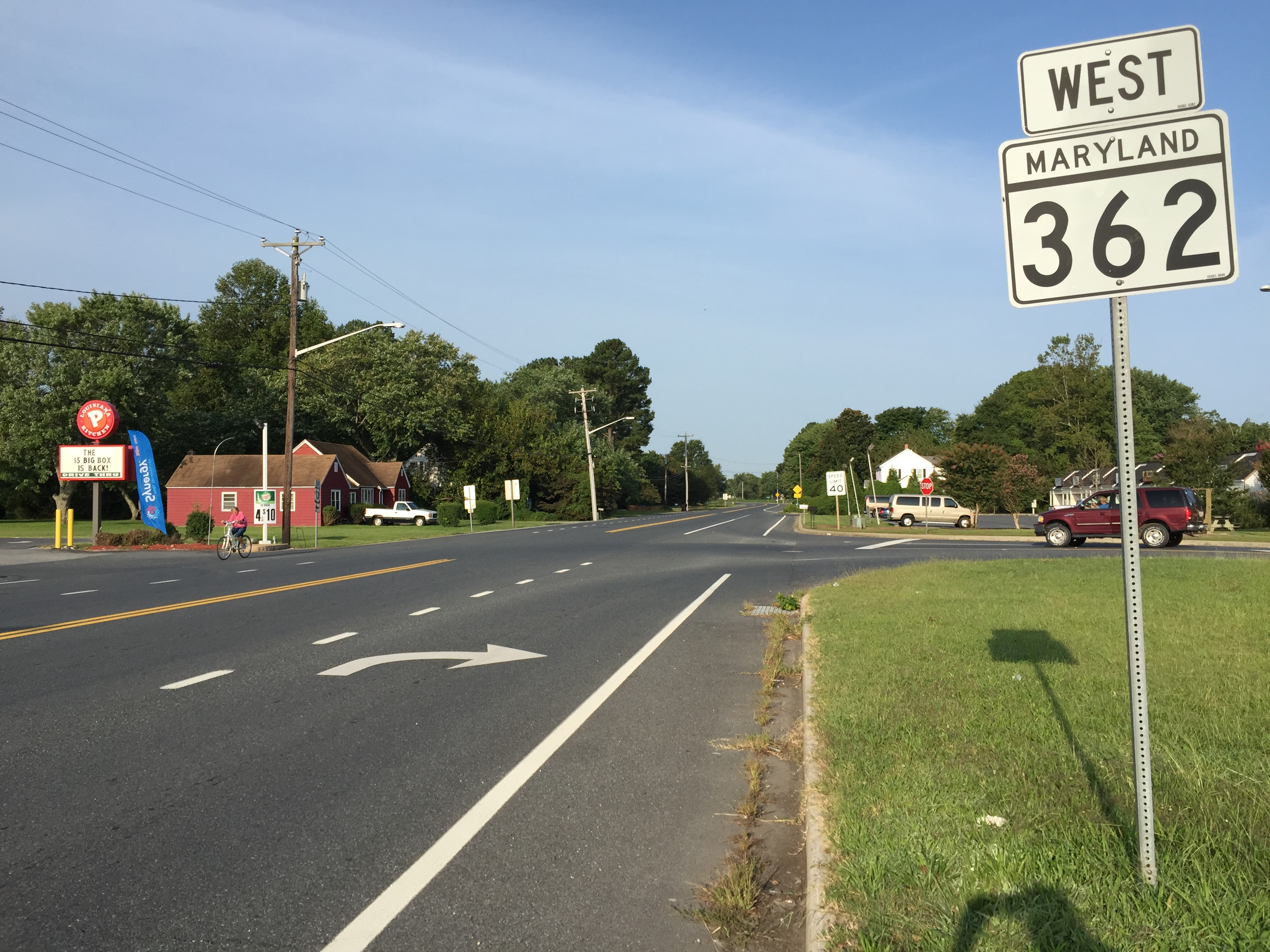
View west along MD 362 at US 13 in Princess Anne

MD 362 begins at an intersection with Bobtown Road. Mount Vernon Road continues west as a county highway into the population center of Mount Vernon, while the state highway heads east as a two-lane undivided road through a mix of farmland and forest. After intersecting Fitzbounds Road, which leads to Whitehaven via the Whitehaven Ferry across the Wicomico River, MD 362 turns southeast and traverses Monie Creek. The highway veers east after passing Black Road. The farmland and forest give way to residences as MD 362 approaches Princess Anne. The state highway intersects Brittingham Lane, which is unsigned MD 920A, between shopping centers immediately before the junction with US 13 (Ocean Highway). A park and ride lot is located at the southwest corner of the intersection. After crossing US 13, MD 362 expands to a three-lane road with a center left-turn lane, passing through a commercial area before reaching its eastern terminus at MD 675 (Somerset Avenue) on the north side of downtown Princess Anne.

== History ==
The first section of MD 362 was built as a modern highway from the original alignment of US 13 in Princess Anne in 1929. The highway was extended west to near Monie Creek in 1930. By 1934, MD 362 was under construction again with the completion of the bridge over Monie Creek. The highway was extended to near Fitzbounds Road in 1936 and to its present terminus in 1937.

== Junction list ==
The entire route is in Somerset County.

Location	mi	km	Destinations	Notes
Mount Vernon	0.00	0.00	Mount Vernon Road west / Bobtown Road north	Western terminus
Princess Anne	5.99	9.64	US 13 (Ocean Highway) – Salisbury, Pocomoke	
Princess Anne	6.23	10.03	MD 675 (Somerset Avenue)	Eastern terminus
1.000 mi = 1.609 km; 1.000 km = 0.621 mi
