= List of highways numbered 387 =

The following highways are numbered 387:

== Japan ==
- Japan National Route 387

== United States ==
- Arizona State Route 387
- Georgia State Route 387 (former)
- Louisiana Highway 387 (former)
- Maryland Route 387
- New York State Route 387
- Puerto Rico Highway 387
- South Carolina Highway 387 (former)
- Tennessee State Route 387
- Virginia State Route 387
- Wyoming Highway 387

Preceded by 386	Lists of highways 387	Succeeded by 388
