= Maryland Route 364 =

State highway in Maryland, United States

Maryland Route 364
- Dividing Creek Road
- Maryland Route 364 highlighted in red

Route information
- Maintained by MDSHA
- Length: 5.43 mi (8.74 km)
- Existed: 1927–present

Major junctions
- South end: US 13 in West Pocomoke
- North end: Nassawango Road near Pocomoke State Forest

Location
- Country: United States
- State: Maryland
- Counties: Somerset, Worcester

Highway system
- Maryland highway system; Interstate; US; State; Scenic Byways
← MD 363	→ MD 365

Maryland Route 364 (MD 364) is a state highway in the U.S. state of Maryland. Known as Dividing Creek Road, the state highway runs 5.43 miles (8.74 km) from U.S. Route 13 (US 13) in West Pocomoke north to Pocomoke State Forest. MD 364 parallels the Pocomoke River and provides access to Pocomoke River State Park. The state highway was mostly constructed in the early 1930s.

== Route description ==
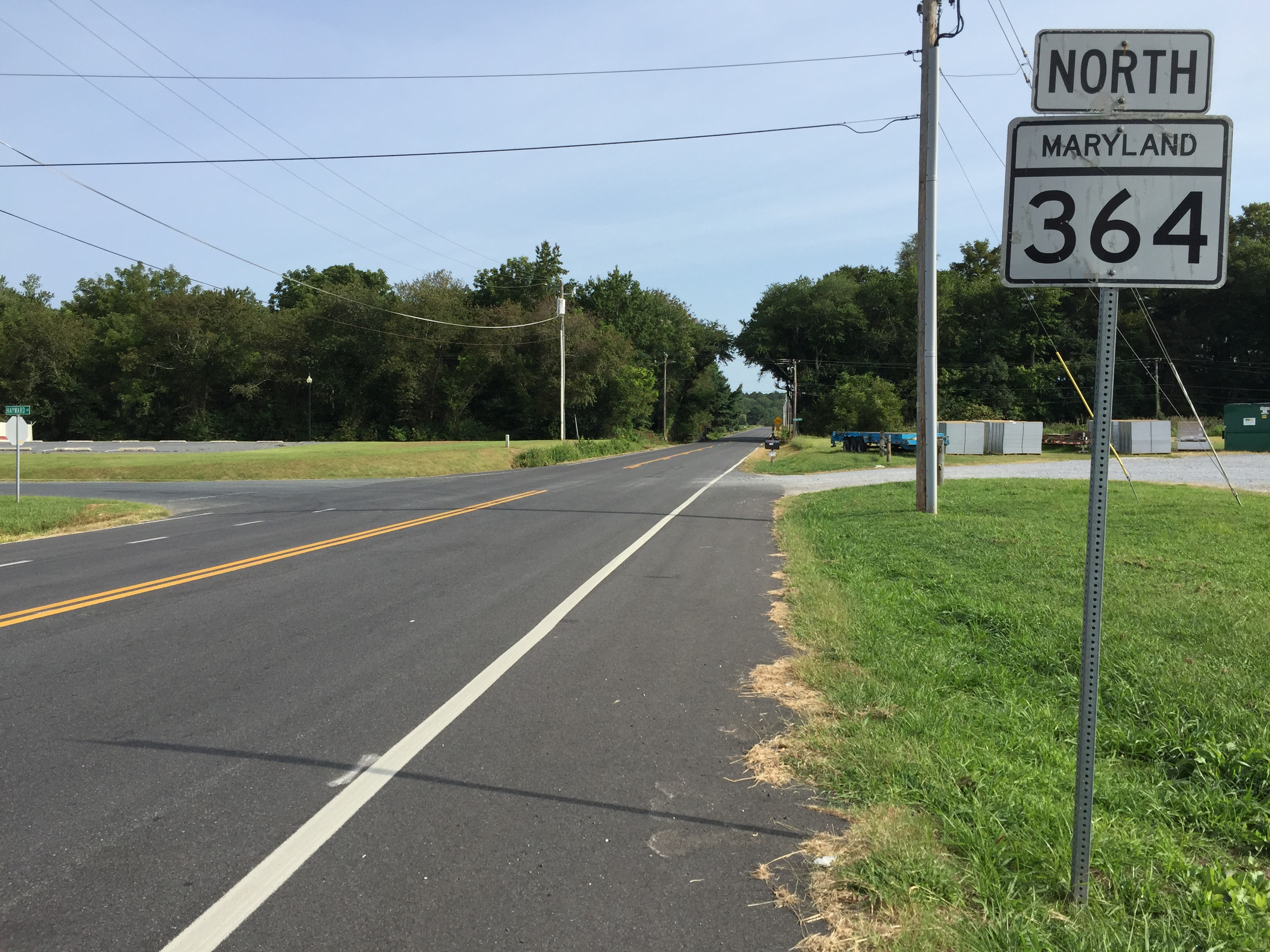
View north along MD 364 at US 13 in West Pocomoke

MD 364 begins at an intersection with US 13 (Ocean Highway) in West Pocomoke. The highway continues on the other side of the intersection as US 13 Business toward Pocomoke City. MD 364 heads north as a two-lane undivided road, passing both ends of Pocomoke River Road. After intersecting Courthouse Hill Road, the state highway crosses Dividing Creek and enters Worcester County. MD 364 passes through more farmland, then reaches its northern terminus just beyond Cellar House Road on the edge of Pocomoke State Forest. The highway continues as Nassawango Road, a county highway that passes through the state forest and provides access to the Milburn Landing unit of Pocomoke River State Park.

== History ==
The first part of MD 364 to be paved was a segment north of Dividing Creek, which was built as a state aid road between 1912 and 1915. By 1927, another segment was built from US 13 halfway to Dividing Creek. The state aid road was partially reconstructed and the remainder of the highway was under construction by 1933, with MD 364 completed in 1935.

== Junction list ==
County	Location	mi	km	Destinations	Notes
Somerset	West Pocomoke	0.00	0.00	US 13 (Ocean Highway) / US 13 Bus. south (Market Street) – Pocomoke, Salisbury, Norfolk	Western terminus; northern terminus of US 13 Bus.
Worcester	Pocomoke State Forest	5.43	8.74	Nassawango Road north – Pocomoke River State Park	Eastern terminus
1.000 mi = 1.609 km; 1.000 km = 0.621 mi
