= List of highways numbered 395 =

Route 395 or Highway 395 may refer to:

== Canada ==
- British Columbia Highway 395
- Manitoba Provincial Road 395
- New Brunswick Route 395
- Nova Scotia Route 395
- Quebec Route 395

== Great Britain ==
- A395 road

== Japan ==
- Japan National Route 395

== United States ==
- Interstate 395
- U.S. Route 395
- Arkansas Highway 395
- California State Route 395 (former)
- Florida State Road 395 (former)
- Kentucky Route 395
- Massachusetts Route 395 (former)
- Nevada State Route 395 (former)
- New Mexico State Road 395
- New York State Route 395
- Oregon Route 395 (former)
- Washington State Route 395 (former)

Preceded by 394	Lists of highways 395	Succeeded by 396
