= List of highways numbered 383 =

The following highways are numbered 383:

== Brazil ==
- BR-383
- SP-383

== Japan ==
- Japan National Route 383

== Spain ==
- Autovía A-383

== United States ==
- U.S. Route 383 (former)
- Arkansas Highway 383 (former)
- Georgia State Route 383
- K-383 (Kansas highway)
- Maryland Route 383
- New York State Route 383
- Ohio State Route 383
- Puerto Rico Highway 383
- South Carolina Highway 383 (former)
- Tennessee State Route 383 (unsigned designation for US-58)
- Virginia State Route 383

Preceded by 382	Lists of highways 383	Succeeded by 384
