= List of highways numbered 394 =

Route 394 or Highway 394 may refer to:

== Canada ==
- Manitoba Provincial Road 394
- Saskatchewan Highway 394

== Japan ==
- Japan National Route 394

== United States ==
- Interstate 394
- Interstate 394 (Illinois) (possible future designation for Illinois Route 394)
- Arkansas Highway 394
- Colorado State Highway 394
- Illinois Route 394
- Iowa Highway 394 (former)
- Maryland Route 394 (former)
- New York:
  - New York State Route 394
  - County Route 394 (Erie County, New York)
- Pennsylvania Route 394
- Puerto Rico Highway 394
- Tennessee State Route 394
- Virginia State Route 394

Preceded by 393	Lists of highways 394	Succeeded by 395
