= Salisbury Bypass =

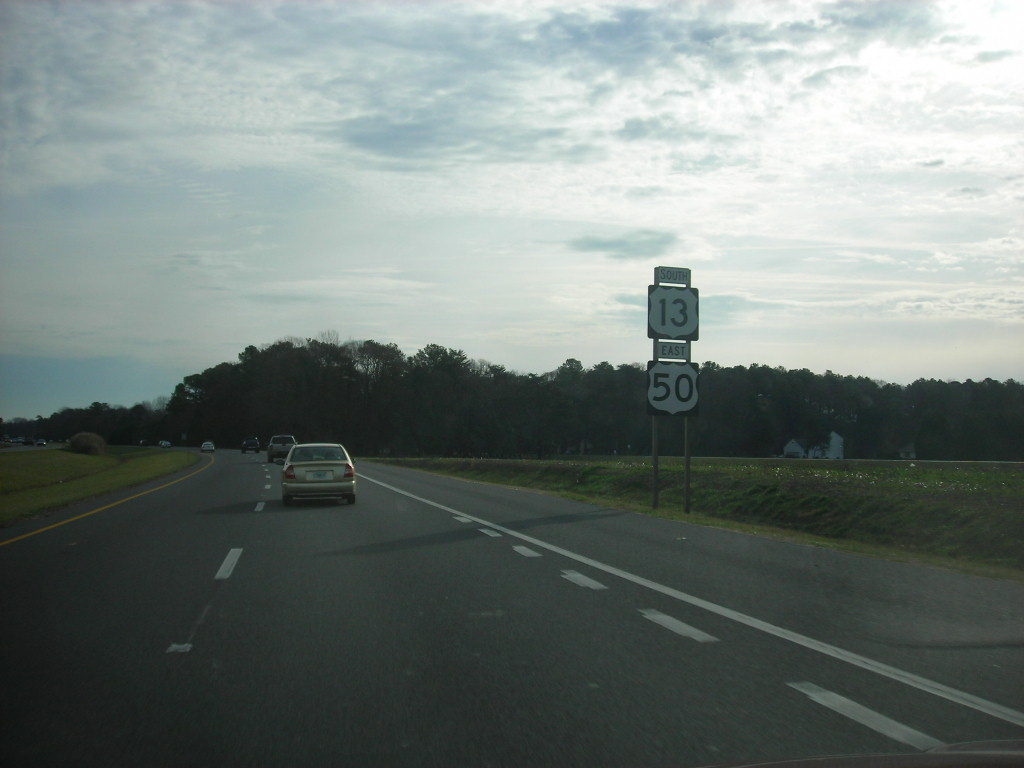
US route 13, Maryland

The Salisbury Bypass is a controlled-access highway and bypass around the business district of Salisbury and Fruitland, Maryland. It consists of segments of:

- U.S. Route 50 in Maryland along its northern half;
- U.S. Route 13 in Maryland along its eastern half; and
- US 13 and US 50 concurrently along the northeast section.
