= SR 388 =

- For highways numbered 388, see List of highways numbered 388
- For the fictional planet from Metroid, see Metroid#Games
