= List of highways numbered 389 =

The following highways are numbered 389:

== Canada ==
- Quebec Route 389

== Japan ==
- Japan National Route 389

== United States ==
- Arizona State Route 389
- Colorado State Highway 389
- Florida State Road 389
- Puerto Rico Highway 389
- South Carolina Highway 389
- Tennessee State Route 389
- Virginia State Route 389

Preceded by 388	Lists of highways 389	Succeeded by 390
