= List of highways numbered 391 =

The following highways are numbered 391:

== Canada ==
- Manitoba Provincial Road 391
- Newfoundland and Labrador Route 391
- Quebec Route 391

== Japan ==
- Japan National Route 391

== United States ==
- Interstate 391
- Colorado State Highway 391
- Florida State Road 391
- New York State Route 391
- Puerto Rico Highway 391
- South Carolina Highway 391
- South Dakota Highway 391
- Tennessee State Route 391
- Virginia State Route 391
- Wyoming Highway 391

Preceded by 390	Lists of highways 391	Succeeded by 392
