= Maryland Route 387 =

State highway in Maryland, United States

Maryland Route 387
- Spa Road
- Maryland Route 387 highlighted in red

Route information
- Maintained by MDSHA and City of Annapolis
- Length: 1.68 mi (2.70 km)
- Existed: 1930–present

Major junctions
- South end: Ferry Point Road near Annapolis
- North end: MD 435 / MD 450 in Annapolis

Location
- Country: United States
- State: Maryland
- Counties: Anne Arundel

Highway system
- Maryland highway system; Interstate; US; State; Scenic Byways
← MD 384	→ MD 388

Maryland Route 387 (MD 387) is a state highway in the U.S. state of Maryland. Known as Spa Road, the highway runs 1.68 miles (2.70 km) from the beginning of state maintenance near Ferry Point Road north to MD 450 and MD 435 in Annapolis in Anne Arundel County. MD 387 was constructed in the late 1920s. Much of the highway was transferred from state to municipal maintenance in the mid-1970s.

== Route description ==
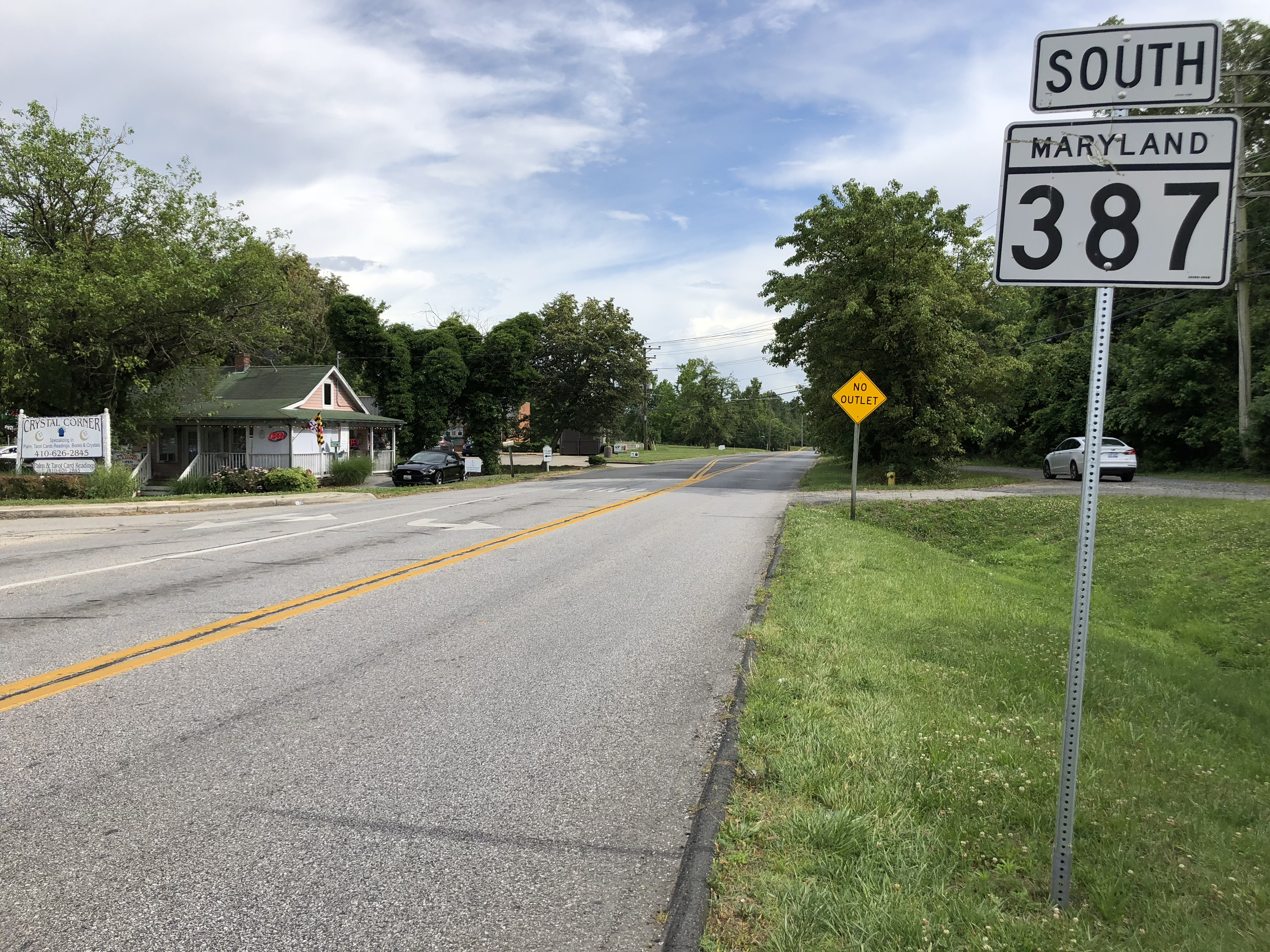
View south along MD 387 at Forest Drive in Annapolis

MD 387 begins at the end of state maintenance just north of the junction of Ferry Point Road and Harness Creek Road. Both roads serve residential communities on the South River. The state highway heads north as a two-lane undivided road. Just north of Old Forest Drive, which is unsigned MD 788A, MD 387 enters the city of Annapolis and becomes municipally maintained. The highway has an oblique intersection with Forest Drive just north of the city limits. MD 387 temporarily gains a second lane southbound and a center turn lane between its intersection with Hilltop Lane and its crossing of Spa Creek. The highway gains a center turn lane again north of the creek and veers northeast between historic Wiley H. Bates High School and the Ballet Theatre of Maryland. MD 387 reaches its northern terminus at the Westgate Circle roundabout at the southeast corner of Annapolis National Cemetery. MD 450 (West Street) forms the east and west legs of the roundabout; the north leg is MD 435 (Taylor Avenue). A one-lane spur from MD 387 to eastbound MD 450 serves as frontage along the south side of the roundabout.

== History ==
MD 387 was constructed as a 18-foot-wide (5.5 m) concrete road in 1929 and 1930. By 1934, the Maryland State Roads Commission recommended the highway be widened to 20 feet (6.1 m). The portion of MD 387 within the city of Annapolis was transferred from state to municipal maintenance in 1974. The northern terminus of the state highway was originally an oblique intersection with MD 450 just east of MD 435's southern terminus. The Westgate Circle roundabout was installed in 1999.

== Junction list ==
The entire route is in Annapolis, Anne Arundel County.

mi	km	Destinations	Notes
0.00	0.00	Ferry Point Road south	Southern terminus; beginning of state maintenance
1.68	2.70	MD 435 north (Taylor Avenue) / MD 450 (West Street) – Parole	Westgate Circle roundabout; northern terminus; southern terminus of MD 435
1.000 mi = 1.609 km; 1.000 km = 0.621 mi
