= List of highways numbered 390 =

The following highways are numbered 390:

== Canada ==
- New Brunswick Route 390
- Newfoundland and Labrador Route 390
- Quebec Route 390

== Japan ==
- Japan National Route 390

== United States ==
- Interstate 390
- Arkansas Highway 390
- Florida State Road 390
- Illinois Route 390
- Kentucky Route 390
- Louisiana Highway 390
- Maryland Route 390
- New York:
  - New York State Route 390
    - New York State Route 390A
  - County Route 390 (Erie County, New York)
- Pennsylvania Route 390
- Puerto Rico Highway 390
- South Carolina Highway 390
- Tennessee State Route 390
- Farm to Market Road 390
- Virginia State Route 390
- Wyoming Highway 390

Preceded by 389	Lists of highways 390	Succeeded by 391
