= Maryland Route 388 =

State highway in Maryland, United States

Maryland Route 388
- Maryland Route 388 highlighted in red

Route information
- Maintained by MDSHA
- Length: 2.38 mi (3.83 km)
- Existed: 1930–present

Major junctions
- West end: MD 675 in Princess Anne
- East end: West Post Office Road near Princess Anne

Location
- Country: United States
- State: Maryland
- Counties: Somerset

Highway system
- Maryland highway system; Interstate; US; State; Scenic Byways
← MD 387	→ MD 390

Maryland Route 388 (MD 388) is a state highway in the U.S. state of Maryland. Known for most of its length as West Post Office Road, the state highway runs 2.38 miles (3.83 km) from MD 675 in Princess Anne east to the end of state maintenance east of Princess Anne. MD 388 was constructed in the early 1930s.

== Route description ==
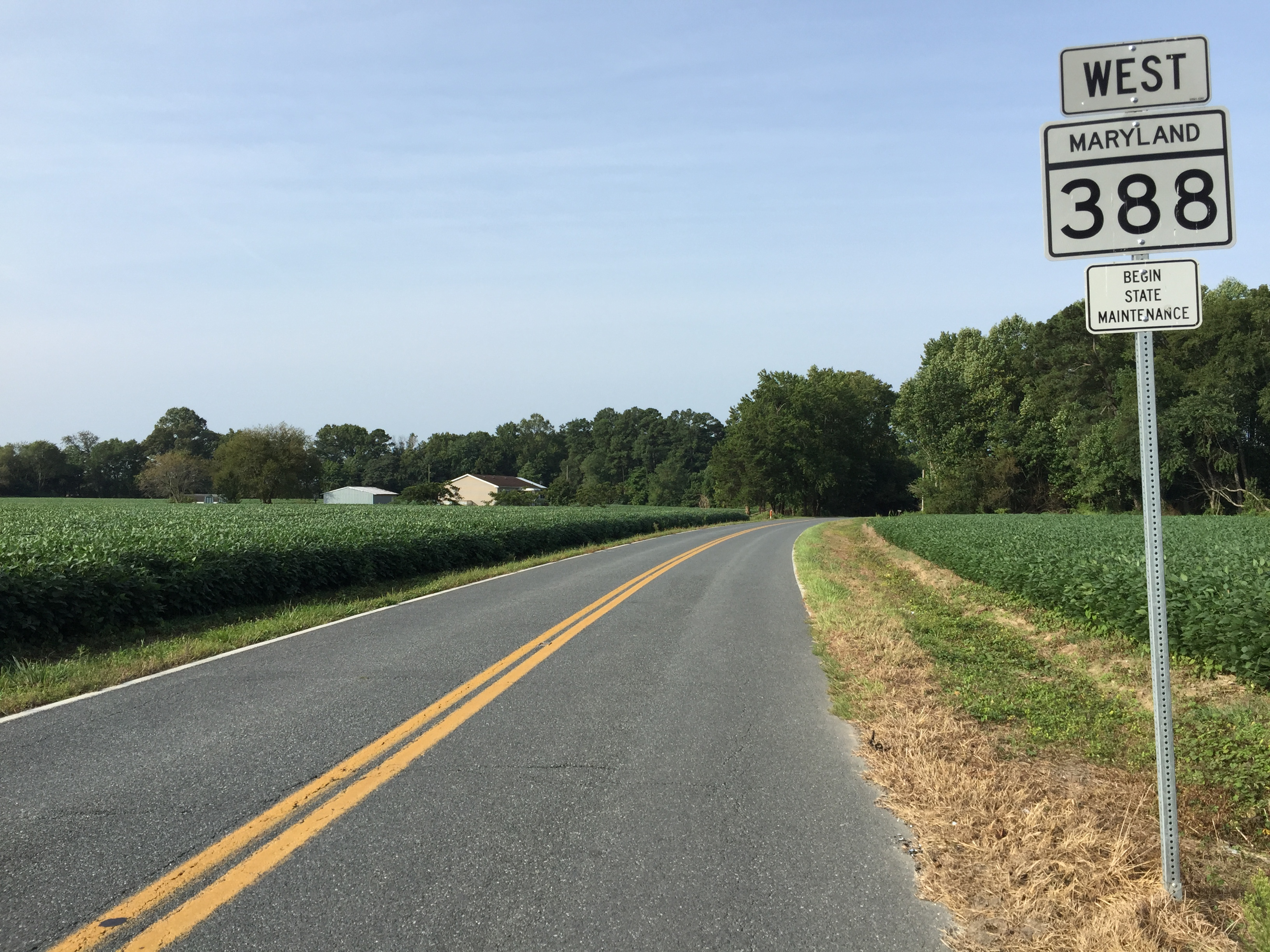
View west at the east end of MD 388 east of Princess Anne

MD 388 begins as two-lane undivided Antioch Avenue at an intersection with MD 675 (Somerset Avenue) in the center of Princess Anne. Antioch Avenue continues west two blocks as a municipal street. MD 388 heads east into farmland after crossing the Delmarva Central Railroad's Delmarva Subdivision track at-grade. The state highway's name changes to West Post Office Road after leaving the town limits of Princess Anne. After passing Freetown Road, MD 388 passes through a stretch of forest, where the highway meets the western end of Perryhawkin Road. After leaving the forest, the state highway reaches its eastern terminus when state maintenance ends at an arbitrary location between two farms. West Post Office Road continues east toward Meadow Bridge Road at the boundary between Somerset County and Worcester County just east of the historic post office in the hamlet of West that gives the road its name.

== History ==
Construction of MD 388 as a modern highway began in 1929 and was completed from Princess Anne east to Freetown Road in 1930. The remainder of the state highway was paved by 1933.

== Junction list ==
The entire route is in Somerset County.

Location	mi	km	Destinations	Notes
Princess Anne	0.00	0.00	MD 675 (Somerset Avenue) / Antioch Avenue west – Salisbury, Pocomoke City	Western terminus
	2.38	3.83	West Post Office Road east	Eastern terminus; end of state maintenance
1.000 mi = 1.609 km; 1.000 km = 0.621 mi
