= List of highways numbered 384 =

The following highways are numbered 384:

== Canada ==
- Manitoba Provincial Road 384

== Japan ==
- Japan National Route 384

== United States ==
- Interstate 384
- Georgia State Route 384
- Maryland Route 384
- New York State Route 384
- Puerto Rico Highway 384
- Virginia State Route 384

Preceded by 383	Lists of highways 384	Succeeded by 385
