= List of highways numbered 386 =

The following highways are numbered 386:

== Brazil ==
- BR-386

== Canada ==
- Quebec Route 386

== Japan ==
- Japan National Route 386

== United States ==
- Arizona State Route 386
- Arkansas Highway 386
- Iowa Highway 386
- Montana Secondary Highway 386
- New York State Route 386
- Puerto Rico Highway 386
- South Carolina Highway 386 (former)
- Tennessee State Route 386
- Virginia Highway 386

| Preceded by 385 | Lists of highways 386 | Succeeded by 387 |
