= Eden, Maryland =

- CDP
- Location of Eden in Somerset County, Maryland
- Coordinates: 38°16′42″N 75°39′9″W
- Country: United States
- State: Maryland
- County: Somerset

Area
  - Total: 5.62 sq mi (14.56 km^{2})
  - Land: 5.59 sq mi (14.47 km^{2})
  - Water: 0.039 sq mi (0.10 km^{2})
- Elevation: 30 ft (9 m)

Population (2020)
  - Total: 803
  - Density: 143.8/sq mi (55.51/km^{2})
- Time zone: UTC−5 (Eastern (EST))
  - Summer (DST): UTC−4 (EDT)
- ZIP code: 21822
- Area codes: 410, 443, and 667
- FIPS code: 24-24850
- GNIS feature ID: 0590130

Eden is a census-designated place (CDP) in Somerset County, Maryland, United States. The Eden zip code (21822) also includes parts of Wicomico and Worcester counties. The population was 793 at the 2000 census. It is included in the Salisbury, Maryland-Delaware Metropolitan Statistical Area.

== Geography ==
Eden is located at 38°16′42″N 75°39′09″W.

According to the United States Census Bureau, the CDP has a total area of 5.6 square miles (15 km^{2}), of which 5.6 square miles (15 km^{2}) is land and 0.04 square miles (0.10 km^{2}) (0.71%) is water.

== Demographics ==
Historical population
Census	Pop.	Note	%±
2000	793		—
2010	823		3.8%
2020	803		−2.4%
U.S. Decennial Census

=== 2010 ===
Population by Race in Eden Maryland (2010)
Race	Population	% of Total
Total	823	100
White	497	60
African American	281	34

=== 2000 ===
As of the census of 2000, there were 793 people, 308 households, and 217 families residing in the CDP. The population density was 141.7 inhabitants per square mile (54.7/km^{2}). There were 335 housing units at an average density of 59.9 per square mile (23.1/km^{2}). The racial makeup of the CDP was 58.26% White, 38.46% African American, 1.13% Native American, 0.13% Asian, 0.25% from other races, and 1.77% from two or more races. Hispanic or Latino of any race were 0.63% of the population.

There were 308 households, out of which 32.8% had children under the age of 18 living with them, 47.4% were married couples living together, 18.5% had a female householder with no husband present, and 29.5% were non-families. 24.0% of all households were made up of individuals, and 5.5% had someone living alone who was 65 years of age or older. The average household size was 2.57 and the average family size was 3.03.

In the CDP, the population was spread out, with 26.9% under the age of 18, 7.2% from 18 to 24, 30.1% from 25 to 44, 26.4% from 45 to 64, and 9.5% who were 65 years of age or older. The median age was 37 years. For every 100 females, there were 86.6 males. For every 100 females age 18 and over, there were 86.5 males.

The median income for a household in the CDP was $34,408, and the median income for a family was $34,844. Males had a median income of $21,875 versus $17,700 for females. The per capita income for the CDP was $13,716. About 6.2% of families and 8.3% of the population were below the poverty line, including 3.0% of those under age 18 and 32.7% of those age 65 or over.

== Transportation ==
Eden is located on U.S. Route 13 at the intersection of Eden-Allen Road, south of the Wicomico County border and the US 13: Salisbury Bypass.

Eden is also served by the commuter bus service of the lower Eastern Shore, Shore Transit. Only one route has a stop in the community, which is at the intersection of Eden-Allen Road:

- Route 2: Princess Anne and Delmar
