= Grace Episcopal Church (Mt. Vernon, Maryland) =

Historic church in Maryland, United States

- U.S. National Register of Historic Places
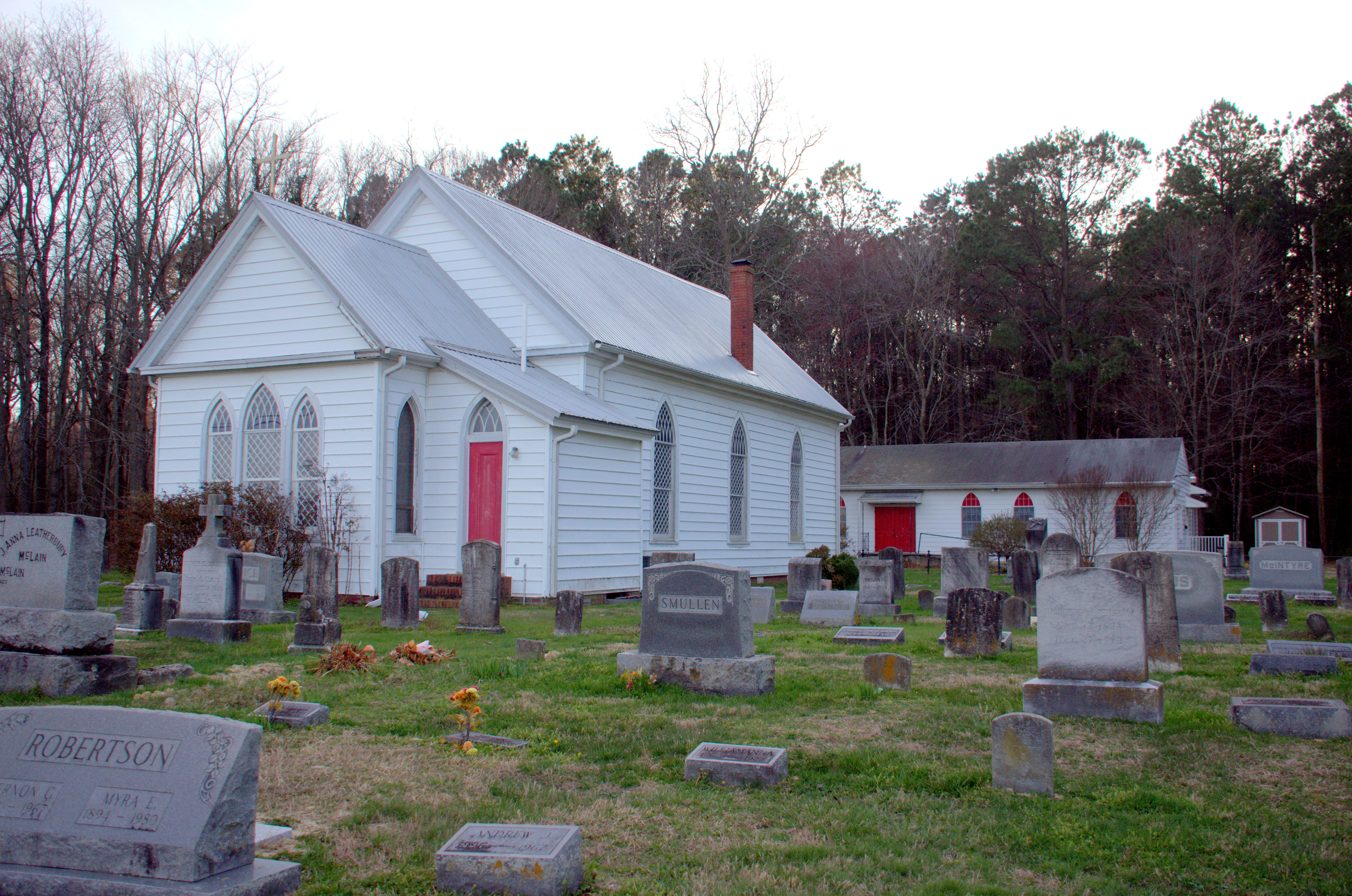

- Location within Maryland Location within the United States
- Location: Mt. Vernon Road (MD 362), Mt. Vernon, Maryland
- Coordinates: 38°14′36″N 75°46′9″W
- Area: 2.5 acres (1.0 ha)
- Built: 1846
- Architectural style: Greek Revival, Gothic Revival, Carpenter Gothic
- NRHP reference No.: 90001565
- Added to NRHP: November 1, 1990

Grace Episcopal Church is an historic frame Episcopal church located at Mt. Vernon, Somerset County, Maryland. Built in 1846–1847, it is a single-story, three-bay Carpenter Gothic-style church on a brick foundation. Also on the property is a 19th and 20th century cemetery.

It was listed on the National Register of Historic Places in 1990.
