= List of highways numbered 393 =

The following highways are numbered 393:

== Brazil ==
- BR-393

== Canada ==
- Manitoba Provincial Road 393
- Quebec Route 393

== Japan ==
- Japan National Route 393

== United States ==
- Interstate 393
- Arkansas Highway 393
- Kentucky Route 393
- Maryland Route 393
  - Maryland Route 393 (former)
- New York State Route 393 (former)
- Puerto Rico Highway 393
- South Carolina Highway 393 (former)
- Virginia State Route 393

Preceded by 392	Lists of highways 393	Succeeded by 394
