= List of highways numbered 388 =

The following highways are numbered 388:

== Canada ==
- Quebec Route 388

== Japan ==
- Japan National Route 388

== United States ==
- Arkansas Highway 388
- Georgia State Route 388
- Maryland Route 388
- New York State Route 388 (former)
- Pennsylvania Route 388
- Puerto Rico Highway 388
- South Carolina Highway 388 (former)
- Tennessee State Route 388
- Virginia State Route 388

Preceded by 387	Lists of highways 388	Succeeded by 389
