= List of highways numbered 385 =

Route 385, or Highway 385, may refer to:

== Canada ==
- New Brunswick Route 385
- Quebec Route 385

== Japan ==
- Japan National Route 385

== United States ==
- Interstate 385
- U.S. Route 385
- Arkansas Highway 385
- Florida State Road 385
- Georgia State Route 385
- Maryland Route 385 (former)
- New York State Route 385
  - New York State Route 385 (former)
- Ohio State Route 385
- South Carolina Highway 385
- Tennessee State Route 385
- Texas:
  - Texas State Highway Loop 385
  - Ranch to Market Road 385
- Virginia State Route 385

Territories

- Puerto Rico Highway 385

Preceded by 384	Lists of highways 385	Succeeded by 386
