= List of highways numbered 392 =

The following highways are numbered 392:

== Brazil ==
- BR-392

== Canada ==
- Manitoba Provincial Road 392
- Newfoundland and Labrador Route 392

== Japan ==
- Japan National Route 392

== United Kingdom ==
- A392

== United States ==
- Arkansas Highway 392
  - Arkansas Highway 392 (former)
- Colorado State Highway 392
- Florida State Road 392A
- Maryland Route 392
- New York:
  - New York State Route 392
    - New York State Route 392 (former)
  - County Route 392 (Erie County, New York)
- Pennsylvania Route 392
- Puerto Rico Highway 392
- South Carolina Highway 392
- Tennessee State Route 392
- Virginia State Route 392

Preceded by 391	Lists of highways 392	Succeeded by 393
