= Louisiana Highway 387 =

State highway in Louisiana, United States

Louisiana Highway 387
- LA 387 highlighted in red on a modern map

Route information
- Maintained by Louisiana DOTD
- Length: 2.5 mi (4.0 km)
- Existed: 1955 renumbering–c. 1950s

Major junctions
- South end: LA 23 in Belle Chasse
- North end: End state maintenance near U.S. Naval Ammunition Depot in Belle Chasse

Location
- Country: United States
- State: Louisiana
- Parishes: Plaquemines

Highway system
- Louisiana State Highway System; Interstate; US; State; Scenic
← LA 386	→ LA 388

Louisiana Highway 387 (LA 387) was a state highway that served Plaquemines Parish. It spanned 2.5 miles (4.0 km) in a south to north direction along the west bank of the Mississippi River in Belle Chasse.

== Route description ==
From the south, LA 387 began at an intersection with LA 23 in Belle Chasse. It proceeded north along the west bank of the Mississippi River and turned northeast just before its end at the former U.S. Naval Ammunition Depot.

LA 387 was an undivided, two-lane highway for its entire length.

== History ==
LA 387 was originally designated as part of State Route 996 prior to the 1955 Louisiana Highway renumbering. At one time, State Route 996 followed the river road from Belle Chasse to Algiers in New Orleans.

== Major intersections ==
The entire highway was in Belle Chasse, Plaquemines Parish.

mi	km	Destinations	Notes
0.0	0.0	LA 23 – Gretna, Port Sulphur	Southern terminus
2.5	4.0	End state maintenance near U.S. Naval Ammunition Depot	Northern terminus
1.000 mi = 1.609 km; 1.000 km = 0.621 mi
