= New York State Route 394 (disambiguation) =

New York State Route 394 is an east–west state highway in Chautauqua and Cattaraugus Counties in New York, United States, that was established in the early 1970s.

New York State Route 394 may also refer to:

- New York State Route 394 (1930–1935) in Montgomery County
- New York State Route 394 (1936–1967) in Westchester County
