= New York State Route 383 (disambiguation) =

New York State Route 383 is a north–south state highway in Monroe County, New York, United States, that was established in the early 1940s.

New York State Route 383 may also refer to:

- New York State Route 383 (1930–1935) in Erie County, see List of former state routes in New York (301–400)
- New York State Route 383 (1935 – early 1940s) in Broome and Chenango Counties
