= Interstate 395 =

Interstate 395 is the designation for the following five existing Interstate Highways in the United States, all of which are related to I-95:

- Interstate 395 (Connecticut–Massachusetts), a spur from I-95 to Auburn, Massachusetts
- Interstate 395 (Florida), a spur in Miami, Florida
- Interstate 395 (Maine), a spur in Bangor, Maine
- Interstate 395 (Maryland), a spur in Baltimore, Maryland
- Interstate 395 (Virginia–District of Columbia), a spur from I-95 to Washington, D.C.

Other:

- Interstate 395 (Delaware), a proposed portion of I-95 in Delaware, when it was under construction
- Interstate 395 (Pennsylvania), a proposed portion of I-76 in Pennsylvania which was at one point intended to be numbered I-395
