= List of U.S. Highways in Maryland =

United States Numbered Highways of the Maryland highway system
- Standard route signs in Maryland

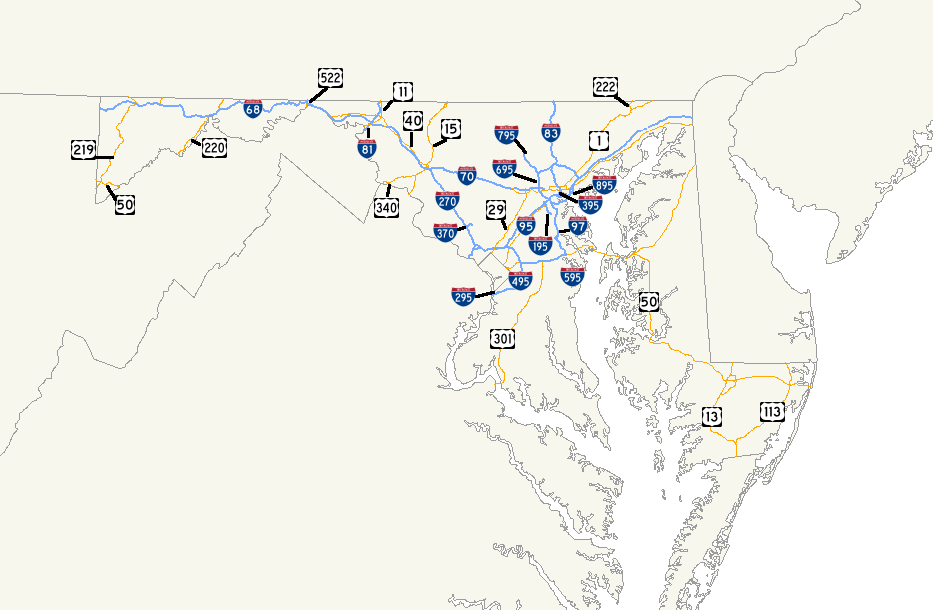

Highway names
- US Highways: U.S. Route X (US X)
- Special Routes: U.S. Route X Alternate (US X Alt.); U.S. Route X Business (US X Bus.); U.S. Route X Scenic (US X Scenic); U.S. Route X Truck (US X Truck)

System links
- Maryland highway system; Interstate; US; State; Scenic Byways

The following is a list of U.S. Highways in Maryland. There are currently 14 U.S. Highways that exist entirely or partially in the U.S. state of Maryland. Seven of these are primary U.S. Highways while seven are auxiliary U.S. Highways that may or may not be related to one of the primary U.S. Highways. The longest primary U.S. Highway in Maryland is U.S. Route 40 (commonly abbreviated US 40) at 221.31 miles (356.16 km). The shortest primary U.S. Highway in Maryland is US 11 at 12.83 miles (20.65 km). The longest auxiliary U.S. Highway in Maryland is US 301 at 123.30 miles (198.43 km). The shortest auxiliary U.S. Highway in Maryland is US 522 at 2.37 miles (3.81 km). All U.S. Highways are maintained by the Maryland State Highway Administration except for the portions that run through Baltimore, Hagerstown, and Cumberland. Maryland has five former U.S. Highways; those five are shaded in dark gray in the list.

== Mainline routes ==
Number	Length (mi)	Length (km)	Southern or western terminus	Northern or eastern terminus	Formed	Removed	Notes
US 1	80.25	129.15	US 1 in Washington, D.C.	US 1 at the Pennsylvania state line near Rising Sun	1926	current	
US 11	12.83	20.65	US 11 at the West Virginia state line in Williamsport	US 11 at the Pennsylvania state line near Hagerstown	1926	current	
US 13	42.48	68.36	US 13 at the Virginia state line near Pocomoke City	US 13 at the Delaware state line in Delmar	1926	current	
US 15	37.85	60.91	US 15 at the Virginia state line at Point of Rocks	US 15 at the Pennsylvania state line near Emmitsburg	1927	current	
US 29	29.51	47.49	US 29 in Washington, D.C.	MD 99 in Ellicott City	1934	current	
US 40	221.31	356.16	US 40 at the Pennsylvania state line near Keysers Ridge	US 40 at the Delaware state line in Elkton	1926	current	
US 48	81.09	130.50	US 48 at the West Virginia state line near Friendsville	I-70 / US 40 / US 522 in Hancock	1974	1991	Replaced by I-68
US 50	150.06	241.50	US 50 at the West Virginia state line near Redhouse US 50 in Washington, D.C.	US 50 at the West Virginia state line near Gorman MD 378 / MD 528 in Ocean City	1926	current	Two segments; length is sum of segments
US 111	32.24	51.89	US 1 in Baltimore	US 111 at the Pennsylvania state line at Maryland Line	1926	1963	Replaced by MD 45, I-695, and I-83
US 113	37.84	60.90	US 13 in Pocomoke City	US 113 at the Delaware state line at Bishop	1926	current	
US 140	38.50	61.96	US 1 in Baltimore	US 140 at the Pennsylvania state line near Littlestown, PA	1926	1979	Replaced by MD 140 and MD 97
US 213	58.27	93.78	US 50 in Wye Mills	US 40 in Elkton	1926	1972	Replaced by MD 213
US 219	48.40	77.89	US 219 at the West Virginia state line near Redhouse	US 219 at the Pennsylvania state line near Grantsville	1926	current	
US 220	27.35	44.02	US 220 at the West Virginia state line in McCoole	US 220 at the Pennsylvania state line near Dickens	1926	current	
US 222	3.60	5.79	US 1 at Conowingo	US 222 at the Pennsylvania state line near Conowingo	1930	current	
US 240	36.75	59.14	US 240 in Washington, D.C.	I-70 / US 40 in Frederick	1926	1973	Replaced by MD 355 and I-270
US 301	122.85	197.71	US 301 at the Virginia state line near Newburg	US 301 at the Delaware state line near Warwick	1939	current	
US 340	16.99	27.34	US 340 at the Virginia state line near Harpers Ferry, WV	US 15 / US 40 in Frederick	1926	current	
US 522	2.37	3.81	US 522 at the West Virginia state line in Hancock	I-70 / US 522 at the Pennsylvania state line in Hancock	1930	current	

== Special routes ==
Number	Length (mi)	Length (km)	Southern or western terminus	Northern or eastern terminus	Formed	Removed	Notes
US 1 Alt.	2.09	3.36	US 1 Alternate in Washington, D.C.	US 1 in Hyattsville	1946	current	Alternate route via Bladensburg
US 1 Alt.	3.92	6.31	US 1 in Arbutus	US 1 in Baltimore	1949	current	Alternate route via Halethorpe
US 1 Bus.	6.90	11.10	US 1 / MD 147 at Benson	US 1 in Hickory	1966	current	Business route through Bel Air
US 13 Bus.	2.48	3.99	US 13 in Pocomoke City	US 13 / MD 364 in West Pocomoke	1994	current	Business route through Pocomoke City
US 13 Bus.	8.14	13.10	US 13 near Fruitland	US 13 / US 50 in Salisbury	1983	current	Business route through Fruitland and Salisbury
US 15 Bus.	2.34	3.77	US 15 near Emmitsburg	US 15 in Emmitsburg	1967	current	Business route through Emmitsburg
US 40 Alt.	31.80	51.18	US 40 at Keyser's Ridge	I-68 / US 40 / US 220 / MD 639 in Cumberland	1983	current	Alternate route via Grantsville and Frostburg
US 40 Alt.	22.97	36.97	Potomac Street in Hagerstown	US 40 in Frederick	1952	current	Alternate route via Boonsboro and Middletown
US 40 Scenic	9.50	15.29	Fifteen Mile Creek Road in Green Ridge State Forest	I-68 / US 40 near Hancock	1965	current	Scenic route across Town Hill and Sideling Hill; length only includes state-maintained section in Allegany County
US 50 Bus.	6.88	11.07	US 50 near Salisbury	US 13 / US 50 in Salisbury	2002	current	Business route through Salisbury
US 113 Bus.	2.48	3.99	US 113 near Snow Hill	US 113 in Snow Hill	1997	current	Business route through Snow Hill
