= Mount Vernon, Maryland =

- CDP
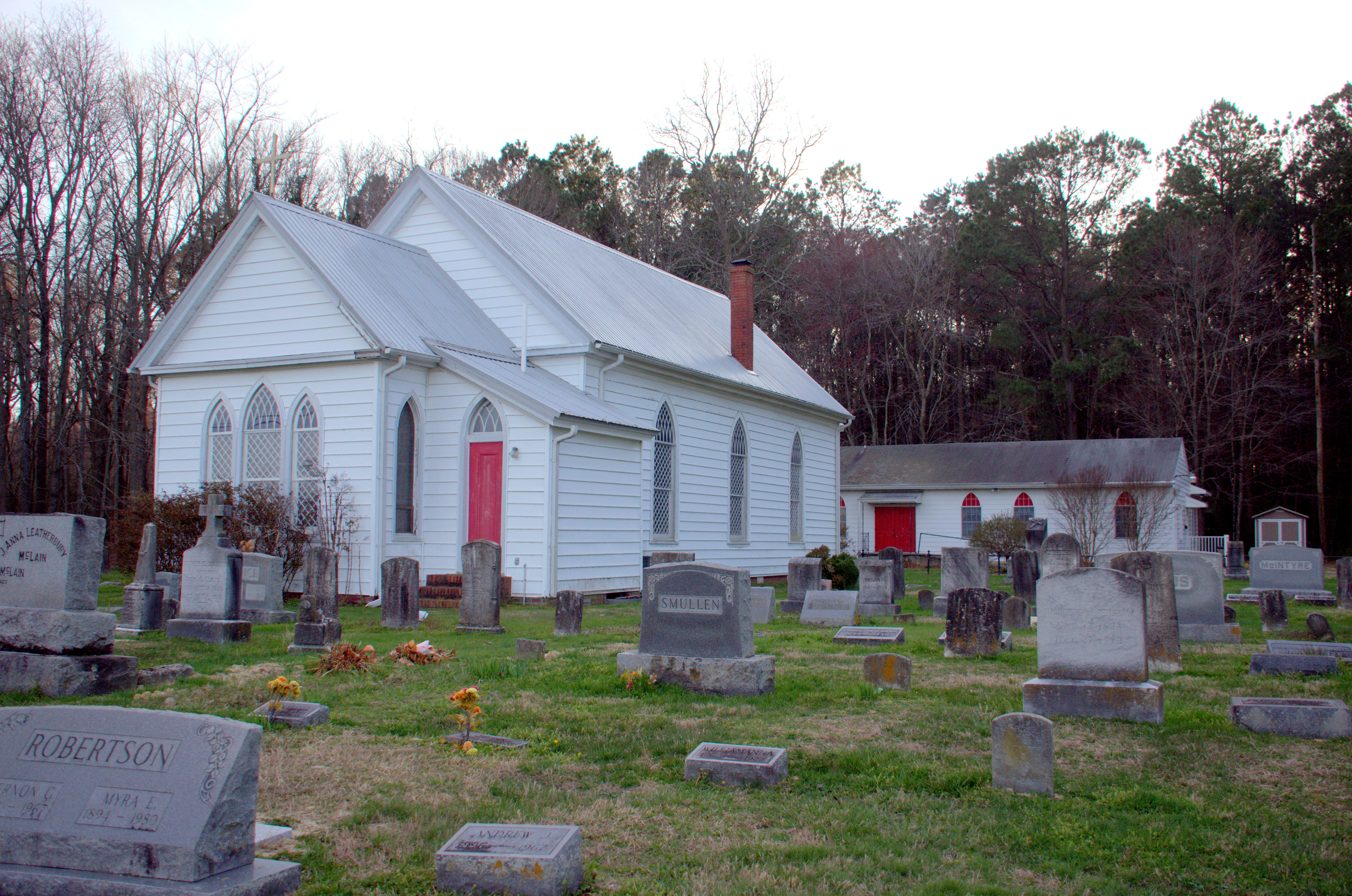
- Grace Episcopal Church and Cemetery

- Coordinates: 38°14′58″N 75°47′51″W
- Country: United States
- State: Maryland
- County: Somerset

Area
  - Total: 15.65 sq mi (40.53 km^{2})
  - Land: 13.03 sq mi (33.74 km^{2})
  - Water: 2.62 sq mi (6.79 km^{2})
- Elevation: 6.6 ft (2 m)

Population (2020)
  - Total: 761
  - Density: 58.4/sq mi (22.55/km^{2})
- Time zone: UTC−5 (Eastern (EST))
  - Summer (DST): UTC−4 (EDT)
- ZIP code: 21853
- Area codes: 410 and 443 and 667
- FIPS code: 24-54375
- GNIS feature ID: 0590845

Mount Vernon is a census-designated place (CDP) in Somerset County, Maryland, United States. The population was 761 at the 2000 census. It is included in the Salisbury, Maryland-Delaware Metropolitan Statistical Area.

== Geography ==
Mount Vernon is located at 38°14′58″N 75°47′51″W (38.249456, −75.797422).

According to the United States Census Bureau, the CDP has a total area of 15.9 square miles (41 km^{2}), of which 13.1 square miles (34 km^{2}) is land and 2.8 square miles (7.3 km^{2}) (17.59%) is water.

== Demographics ==
Historical population
Census	Pop.	Note	%±
2000	761		—
2020	761		—
U.S. Decennial Census

As of the census of 2000, there were 761 people, 311 households, and 227 families residing in the CDP. The population density was 58.0 inhabitants per square mile (22.4/km^{2}). There were 402 housing units at an average density of 30.6 per square mile (11.8/km^{2}). The racial makeup of the CDP was 75.69% White, 23.26% African American, 0.39% Native American, 0.13% Asian, and 0.53% from two or more races. Hispanic or Latino of any race were 0.79% of the population.

There were 311 households, out of which 23.5% had children under the age of 18 living with them, 57.9% were married couples living together, 9.3% had a female householder with no husband present, and 26.7% were non-families. 24.4% of all households were made up of individuals, and 13.5% had someone living alone who was 65 years of age or older. The average household size was 2.45 and the average family size was 2.86.

In the CDP, the population was spread out, with 20.2% under the age of 18, 6.7% from 18 to 24, 25.8% from 25 to 44, 28.3% from 45 to 64, and 19.1% who were 65 years of age or older. The median age was 44 years. For every 100 females, there were 106.2 males. For every 100 females age 18 and over, there were 105.8 males.

The median income for a household in the CDP was $43,750, and the median income for a family was $48,289. Males had a median income of $34,271 versus $34,432 for females. The per capita income for the CDP was $19,919. About 10.2% of families and 17.3% of the population were below the poverty line, including 30.5% of those under age 18 and 15.8% of those age 65 or over.

== Community ==
As of 2010, Mt. Vernon has four churches, one country store, Webster's Cove Marina, and the Mt. Vernon Volunteer Fire Company, which celebrated its 25th anniversary in 2007. Grace Episcopal Church was listed on the National Register of Historic Places in 1990.
