= West Pocomoke, Maryland =

- CDP
- Coordinates: 38°5′6″N 75°35′48″W
- Country: United States
- State: Maryland
- County: Somerset

Area
  - Total: 9.61 sq mi (24.90 km^{2})
  - Land: 9.41 sq mi (24.36 km^{2})
  - Water: 0.21 sq mi (0.54 km^{2})
- Elevation: 20 ft (6 m)

Population (2020)
  - Total: 481
  - Density: 51.1/sq mi (19.74/km^{2})
- Time zone: UTC−5 (Eastern (EST))
  - Summer (DST): UTC−4 (EDT)
- FIPS code: 24-83337
- GNIS feature ID: 1852603

West Pocomoke is a census-designated place (CDP) in Somerset County, Maryland, United States. The population was 498 at the 2000 census. It is included in the Salisbury, Maryland-Delaware Metropolitan Statistical Area.

== Geography ==
West Pocomoke is located at 38°5′6″N 75°35′48″W (38.085027, −75.596581).

According to the United States Census Bureau, the CDP has a total area of 9.6 square miles (25 km^{2}), of which 9.4 square miles (24 km^{2}) is land and 0.2 square miles (0.52 km^{2}) (2.49%) is water.

== Demographics ==
Historical population
| Census | Pop. | Note | %± |
|---|---|---|---|
| 2000 | 498 | | — |
| 2020 | 481 | | — |
U.S. Decennial Census

As of the census of 2000, there were 498 people, 217 households, and 141 families residing in the CDP. The population density was 53.1 inhabitants per square mile (20.5/km^{2}). There were 239 housing units at an average density of 25.5/sq mi (9.8/km^{2}). The racial makeup of the CDP was 66.47% White, 32.93% African American, 0.20% Native American, 0.20% Asian, and 0.20% from two or more races. Hispanic or Latino of any race were 0.40% of the population.

There were 217 households, out of which 19.8% had children under the age of 18 living with them, 51.2% were married couples living together, 10.1% had a female householder with no husband present, and 35.0% were non-families. 28.6% of all households were made up of individuals, and 14.7% had someone living alone who was 65 years of age or older. The average household size was 2.29 and the average family size was 2.83.

In the CDP, the population was spread out, with 19.3% under the age of 18, 6.8% from 18 to 24, 26.9% from 25 to 44, 27.3% from 45 to 64, and 19.7% who were 65 years of age or older. The median age was 43 years. For every 100 females, there were 91.5 males. For every 100 females age 18 and over, there were 90.5 males.

The median income for a household in the CDP was $21,635, and the median income for a family was $29,792. Males had a median income of $25,865 versus $16,058 for females. The per capita income for the CDP was $26,318. About 17.2% of families and 20.6% of the population were below the poverty line, including 50.0% of those under age 18 and 24.8% of those age 65 or over.
