= Delmar, Maryland =

- Town
- Flag Seal
- Motto: The Little Town Too Big For One State
- Location of Delmar, Maryland
- Coordinates: 38°27.1′N 75°34.2′W
- Country: United States
- State: Maryland
- County: Wicomico
- Incorporated: 1888

Government
  - Mayor: Benjamin Jorden
  - Deputy Mayor: Jack Lennox

Area
  - Total: 1.70 sq mi (4.41 km^{2})
  - Land: 1.69 sq mi (4.38 km^{2})
  - Water: 0.015 sq mi (0.04 km^{2})
- Elevation: 49 ft (15 m)

Population (2020)
  - Total: 3,798
  - Density: 2,246.9/sq mi (867.52/km^{2})
- Time zone: UTC-5 (Eastern (EST))
  - Summer (DST): UTC-4 (EDT)
- ZIP code: 21875
- Area codes: 410, 443
- FIPS code: 24-22600
- GNIS feature ID: 0584085
- Website: www.townofdelmar.us

Delmar is a town in Wicomico County, Maryland, United States. As of the 2020 census, Delmar had a population of 3,798. It is included in the Salisbury, Maryland-Delaware Metropolitan Statistical Area. When the population is added to Delmar, Delaware, the town's total population is 4,600.

== History ==
The Town of Delmar was founded in October 1859 with the extension of the Delaware Railroad to the southern boundary of Delaware. The Transpeninsular Line was responsible for the founding of this unique bi-state town because the Charter of the Delaware Railroad Company permitted only the building of a railroad within the State of Delaware and the charter of the corresponding railroad company in Maryland permitted only the laying of railroad track within the State of Maryland. Thus, in 1859, the two respective railroads met and the Town of Delmar was born. The name of Delmar was derived for this railroad center from the states whose line it straddles – DELaware and MARyland.

The Town of Delmar grew slowly until 1884 when the New York, Philadelphia and Norfolk Railroad Co. completed a railroad from Pocomoke City, Maryland to Cape Charles, Virginia and also established a ferry service across the Chesapeake Bay between Cape Charles and Norfolk, Virginia. These new developments immediately made the Delmarva Peninsula an important link between the north and south. The Town of Delmar, being the midway town of the Delmarva Peninsula and already a railroad terminal, was the point for trains to change crews and locomotives and also a center for maintenance of the rolling equipment. As a result of these developments, a tremendous influx of experienced railroad men into the community and considerable extra employment was furnished for local townspeople. During this accelerated rapid growth period, Delmar became a "boom town". New dwelling units sprang up all over town and new businesses were established to meet the demands of its growing population. By 1889, the population of the Town of Delmar had increased to 680 and was still growing.

In 1888, the Town of Delmar, Maryland was granted a charter by the General Assembly of Maryland. An examination of this charter and the laws of Maryland fails to reveal any mention of the twin town of Delmar, Delaware. Therefore, it could be assumed that up until this time there was very little cooperation between halves of the Town of Delmar. The Town of Delmar was almost entirely destroyed by fire in 1892 and again in 1901. The first fire destroyed everything in its path over a ten-acre (40,000 m^{2}) area and the second major fire was almost as destructive. In each instance, the Town of Delmar was rebuilt and continued as a flourishing town. The first indication of any cooperation between Delmar, Maryland and Delmar, Delaware came in 1924 when surveys were conducted for a possible sewerage system for the entire Town of Delmar. The construction of the sewerage system in 1927 was considered the first joint project between the two towns in that the law provided that both towns would maintain the outfall sewer with Maryland paying the expenses and billing the Delaware side one-half of all costs.

The biggest push towards abolishing the jurisdictional, legal effects of the State line came when the Lions Club voted to sponsor a project for the consolidation of the two school systems in the town. Since the town was founded, each side had its own individual school with the one in Delaware operating under the local School Board and the Maryland School operating under the Wicomico County Board of Education. This very controversial issue was bitterly contested for over three years and finally in 1949, this dream became a reality when the junior and senior high schools were consolidated into one school using the Delaware facilities. Four years later the fourth, fifth and sixth grades were also consolidated with classes in the Maryland school. This controversial decision represented one of the greatest steps forward educationally for the town of Delmar and also towards eliminating the jurisdictional barrier between the two parts of town.

== Geography ==
Delmar is located at 38°27.1′N 75°34.2′W (38.4509, −75.5695).

According to the United States Census Bureau, the town has a total area of 1.73 square miles (4.48 km^{2}), of which 1.72 square miles (4.45 km^{2}) is land and 0.01 square miles (0.03 km^{2}) is water.

== Demographics ==
Historical population
Census	Pop.	Note	%±
1880	135		—
1900	659		—
1910	959		45.5%
1920	1,291		34.6%
1930	1,180		−8.6%
1940	1,184		0.3%
1950	1,328		12.2%
1960	1,291		−2.8%
1970	1,191		−7.7%
1980	1,232		3.4%
1990	1,430		16.1%
2000	1,859		30.0%
2010	3,003		61.5%
2020	3,798		26.5%
U.S. Decennial Census

=== 2020 census ===
As of the 2020 census, Delmar had a population of 3,798. The median age was 35.3 years. 26.0% of residents were under the age of 18 and 13.5% of residents were 65 years of age or older. For every 100 females there were 87.2 males, and for every 100 females age 18 and over there were 84.2 males age 18 and over.

99.6% of residents lived in urban areas, while 0.4% lived in rural areas.

There were 1,493 households in Delmar, of which 38.4% had children under the age of 18 living in them. Of all households, 34.8% were married-couple households, 19.4% were households with a male householder and no spouse or partner present, and 37.0% were households with a female householder and no spouse or partner present. About 29.4% of all households were made up of individuals and 9.7% had someone living alone who was 65 years of age or older.

There were 1,601 housing units, of which 6.7% were vacant. The homeowner vacancy rate was 1.0% and the rental vacancy rate was 4.0%.

Racial composition as of the 2020 census
Race	Number	Percent
White	2,177	57.3%
Black or African American	897	23.6%
American Indian and Alaska Native	12	0.3%
Asian	230	6.1%
Native Hawaiian and Other Pacific Islander	2	0.1%
Some other race	143	3.8%
Two or more races	337	8.9%
Hispanic or Latino (of any race)	252	6.6%

=== Income and poverty ===
The median income for a household in the town was $28,462, and the median income for a family was $31,991. Males had a median income of $29,643 versus $20,885 for females. The per capita income for the town was $13,821. About 16.9% of families and 16.9% of the population were below the poverty line, including 23.2% of those under age 18 and 18.7% of those age 65 or over.

=== 2010 census ===
As of the census of 2010, there were 3,003 people, 1,162 households, and 742 families residing in the town. The population density was 1,745.9 inhabitants per square mile (674.1/km^{2}). There were 1,382 housing units at an average density of 803.5 per square mile (310.2/km^{2}). The racial makeup of the town was 68.2% White, 21.3% African American, 0.3% Native American, 5.5% Asian, 1.6% from other races, and 3.1% from two or more races. Hispanic or Latino of any race were 4.6% of the population.

There were 1,162 households, of which 40.0% had children under the age of 18 living with them, 37.0% were married couples living together, 20.1% had a female householder with no husband present, 6.8% had a male householder with no wife present, and 36.1% were non-families. 27.1% of all households were made up of individuals, and 5.9% had someone living alone who was 65 years of age or older. The average household size was 2.58 and the average family size was 3.11.

The median age in the town was 30.5 years. 27.8% of residents were under the age of 18; 12.1% were between the ages of 18 and 24; 29.4% were from 25 to 44; 22.7% were from 45 to 64; and 8.2% were 65 years of age or older. The gender makeup of the town was 45.7% male and 54.3% female.

== Education ==
Delmar is within Wicomico County Public Schools, which operates Delmar Elementary School. It opened in 1920 and was a grade 7-12 school in 1923 but later became the elementary school. The original building consists of the main office and the second floor, with other parts of the first floor being further expansions. It was previously known as Maryland Elementary School. At one time the school went up to grade 6, but by 2000 there were plans to make it only up to the 5th grade.

Students on the Maryland side may go to public school in the Delmar School District in Delaware, which operates Delmar Middle School and Delmar Senior High School. As of 1999 residents of Delmar, Maryland may attend the Delmar, Delaware schools or they may attend Wicomico Middle School.

== Notable people ==
- Lewis J. Fields, United States Marine Corps Lieutenant general
- Elihu Emory Jackson – Governor of Maryland (1888–1892)
- Edward L. Fike (1920-2011), journalist and publisher in California, Montana, North Carolina, Ohio, and Virginia.

== Trivia ==
Delmar was one of the filming locations for the 1986 horror movie Redneck Zombies.

== See also ==
- Twin cities (geographical proximity)
- Delmar, Delaware
