= Fruitland, Maryland =

- City
- Flag Seal

- Location of Fruitland, Maryland
- Coordinates: 38°19′25″N 75°37′10″W
- Country: United States
- State: Maryland
- County: Wicomico
- Incorporated: 1947

Government
  - Type: Council–manager government
  - City Manager: Marc Henderson
  - City Council: Member List: Darlene Kerr (President); Raymond Carr (Treasurer); Richard Lee Outen Jr.; Michael Hammond; Mark Miciotto

Area
  - Total: 3.86 sq mi (10.00 km^{2})
  - Land: 3.85 sq mi (9.98 km^{2})
  - Water: 0.0077 sq mi (0.02 km^{2})
- Elevation: 36 ft (11 m)

Population (2020)
  - Total: 5,534
  - Density: 1,435.7/sq mi (554.32/km^{2})
- Time zone: UTC-5 (Eastern (EST))
  - Summer (DST): UTC-4 (EDT)
- ZIP code: 21826
- Area codes: 410, 443
- FIPS code: 24-30950
- GNIS feature ID: 0584531
- Website: www.cityoffruitland.com

Fruitland is a city in Wicomico County, Maryland, United States. The population was 5,534 at the 2020 census Area.

== History ==
Fruitland began around 1795 as Disharoon’s Cross Roads, named after George Disharoon’s home at a strategic fork in roadways decades before American independence. One of the roads was the dividing line between Somerset and Worcester Counties, making the village politically fragmented until 1867, when Wicomico County was formed from portions of the two counties.

About 1820, the village became known as Forktown, because it was located at the fork of two roads which were used by stage coaches traveling north and south. The stage coach route originated in Accomac, Virginia and continued to Philadelphia, Pennsylvania. The stage coaches would stop at Forktown, change horses and continue on their way.

== Geography ==
Fruitland is located at 38°19′25″N 75°37′10″W (38.323555, -75.619557).

According to the United States Census Bureau, the city has a total area of 3.79 square miles (9.82 km^{2}), of which 3.78 square miles (9.79 km^{2}) is land and 0.01 square miles (0.03 km^{2}) is water.

== Demographics ==
Historical population
Census	Pop.	Note	%±
1950	1,028		—
1960	1,147		11.6%
1970	2,315		101.8%
1980	2,694		16.4%
1990	3,511		30.3%
2000	3,774		7.5%
2010	4,866		28.9%
2020	5,534		13.7%

=== 2020 census ===
As of the 2020 census, Fruitland had a population of 5,534. The median age was 34.1 years. 26.4% of residents were under the age of 18 and 11.8% of residents were 65 years of age or older. For every 100 females there were 89.8 males, and for every 100 females age 18 and over there were 86.4 males age 18 and over.

99.0% of residents lived in urban areas, while 1.0% lived in rural areas.

There were 2,080 households in Fruitland, of which 38.5% had children under the age of 18 living in them. Of all households, 40.0% were married-couple households, 16.9% were households with a male householder and no spouse or partner present, and 34.4% were households with a female householder and no spouse or partner present. About 24.3% of all households were made up of individuals and 8.9% had someone living alone who was 65 years of age or older.

There were 2,287 housing units, of which 9.1% were vacant. The homeowner vacancy rate was 2.5% and the rental vacancy rate was 11.1%.

Racial composition as of the 2020 census
Race	Number	Percent
White	2,880	52.0%
Black or African American	1,718	31.0%
American Indian and Alaska Native	37	0.7%
Asian	252	4.6%
Native Hawaiian and Other Pacific Islander	0	0.0%
Some other race	247	4.5%
Two or more races	400	7.2%
Hispanic or Latino (of any race)	438	7.9%

=== Income and poverty ===
The median income for a household in the city was $34,468, and the median income for a family was $36,181. Males had a median income of $28,495 versus $21,127 for females. The per capita income for the city was $17,774. About 15.2% of families and 18.3% of the population were below the poverty line, including 22.1% of those under age 18 and 16.3% of those age 65 or over.

=== 2010 census ===
As of the census of 2010, there were 4,866 people, 1,840 households, and 1,223 families residing in the city. The population density was 1,287.3 inhabitants per square mile (497.0/km^{2}). There were 2,045 housing units at an average density of 541.0 per square mile (208.9/km^{2}). The racial makeup of the city was 62.0% White, 30.3% African American, 0.6% Native American, 3.1% Asian, 1.4% from other races, and 2.6% from two or more races. Hispanic or Latino of any race were 3.3% of the population.

There were 1,840 households, of which 37.3% had children under the age of 18 living with them, 43.0% were married couples living together, 18.4% had a female householder with no husband present, 5.1% had a male householder with no wife present, and 33.5% were non-families. 23.2% of all households were made up of individuals, and 7.9% had someone living alone who was 65 years of age or older. The average household size was 2.64 and the average family size was 3.11.

The median age in the city was 32.5 years. 26.6% of residents were under the age of 18; 12.1% were between the ages of 18 and 24; 27.4% were from 25 to 44; 23.6% were from 45 to 64; and 10.2% were 65 years of age or older. The gender makeup of the city was 46.6% male and 53.4% female.

Population by Race in Fruitland Maryland (2010)
Race	Population	% of Total
Total	4,866	100
White	3,018	62
African American	1,472	30
Hispanic	160	3
Asian	150	3
Two or More Races	128	2

== Schools ==
Fruitland Intermediate School

Fruitland Primary School (K-2), Fruitland Intermediate School (3-5) and Stepping Stones Learning Academy are within Fruitland's city limits and are operated by Wicomico County Public Schools, which serve the city and surrounding area. Students from Fruitland schools feed into Bennett Middle School (6-8) and then into either James M. Bennett High School or Parkside High School, all of which are located in Salisbury.

== Climate ==
Climate is characterized by relatively high temperatures and evenly distributed precipitation throughout the year. The Köppen Climate Classification subtype for this climate is "Cfa" (Humid Subtropical Climate).

Climate data for Fruitland, Maryland
Month	Jan	Feb	Mar	Apr	May	Jun	Jul	Aug	Sep	Oct	Nov	Dec	Year
Mean daily maximum °C (°F)	8 (47)	9 (48)	14 (57)	19 (67)	24 (76)	29 (84)	31 (87)	30 (86)	27 (80)	21 (70)	16 (60)	9 (49)	20 (68)
Mean daily minimum °C (°F)	−2 (28)	−2 (29)	2 (36)	7 (44)	12 (53)	17 (62)	19 (67)	19 (66)	15 (59)	9 (48)	4 (39)	−1 (31)	8 (47)
Average precipitation mm (inches)	94 (3.7)	81 (3.2)	110 (4.2)	89 (3.5)	89 (3.5)	94 (3.7)	110 (4.2)	140 (5.4)	99 (3.9)	84 (3.3)	79 (3.1)	86 (3.4)	1,140 (44.9)
Source: Weatherbase
