= Ocean Highway =

Route information
- Length: 996 mi (1,603 km)

Major junctions
- South end: US 90 in Jacksonville, FL
- I-295 in Jacksonville I-16 in Savannah, GA; I-26 in Charleston, SC; I-40 in Wilmington, NC; I-64 in Norfolk, VA; US 50 in Salisbury, MD; US 40 in Wilmington, DE; I-76 in Camden, NJ I-195 in Trenton, NJ
- North end: US 1 in North Brunswick, NJ

Location
- Country: United States
- States: Florida, Georgia, South Carolina, North Carolina, Virginia, Maryland, Delaware, New Jersey

Highway system

Ocean Highway was a designation established early in the 20th century for a combination of roadways and water-crossings for motor vehicles which would generally traverse as close as possible to the Atlantic Ocean along the East Coast of the United States from Jacksonville, Florida to North Brunswick, New Jersey. The Ocean Highway concept predated the creation of the Interstate Highway System beginning in the 1950s, and in many states the highways and byways of coastal routes from Florida to North Brunswick still carry the name.

Unlike many of the earlier named roads such as the Lincoln Highway, Dixie Highway, and the National Auto Trails, the Ocean Highway was intended to promote tourism and leisurely drives, rather than primarily a fast and expeditious long distance route. Eight states participated in the program at its inception: Florida, Georgia, South Carolina, North Carolina, Virginia, Maryland, Delaware, and New Jersey. Formed as an opportunity to promote tourism of the various beaches up and down the Atlantic Coast, the Ocean Highway promotions began in the 1930s.

== Route description ==
The Ocean Highway began in Jacksonville, Florida, where it headed to the north on U.S. Route 17, following that route until Virginia. It continued from Florida into Georgia and headed toward Savannah. Within the state of South Carolina, the Ocean Highway ran along the state’s coast, passing through Charleston and Myrtle Beach. In North Carolina, the highway served the cities of Wilmington, Jacksonville, New Bern, and Elizabeth City. The Ocean Highway passed through the Great Dismal Swamp on the border of North Carolina and Virginia before reaching the city of Norfolk, Virginia. At this point, the Ocean Highway shifted from US 17 to U.S. Route 13, and followed that route through Virginia Beach before coming to a ferry across the Chesapeake Bay. From here, the Ocean Highway ran the length of the Eastern Shore of Virginia before coming into Maryland. In Maryland, the Ocean Highway followed US 13 and passed through the city of Salisbury. Continuing into Delaware, the road passed through Dover before coming to Hares Corner, where the Ocean Highway split from US 13 and joined U.S. Route 40. The Ocean Highway crossed the Delaware River into New Jersey and continued to the northeast on U.S. Route 130. It passed through the Camden and Trenton areas before ending in North Brunswick.

There were several spurs that existed off the main Ocean Highway. In North Carolina, side route A ran from the main road in Elizabeth City east to Hatteras Inlet. In South Carolina, the Ocean Highway had five side routes. Side route B ran from Mount Pleasant toward Isle of Palms, side route C connected the road to Folly Beach, side route D ran northwest toward Summerville, side route E connected the route in Adams Run south to Edisto Beach, and side route F ran between Walterboro and Combahee River. In Georgia, side route G ran east to Sea Island.

== History ==
Over the years, some of the routing has changed. For example, for many years, the routing to the north through Virginia after passing the eastern edge of the Dismal Swamp offered a choice. A westerly track followed U.S. Route 17, passing through Portsmouth and crossing the James River Bridge and the George P. Coleman Memorial Bridge to travel northerly to the west of the Chesapeake Bay, while an eastern alternative used U.S. Route 13 to pass through Norfolk and crossed the Chesapeake Bay via the Little Creek Ferry (replaced by the Chesapeake Bay Bridge-Tunnel in 1964) to reach Virginia's Eastern Shore, and move north up the Delmarva Peninsula to Maryland and Delaware. After 1964, the former Little Creek Ferry equipment was transferred to the Delaware Bay, and the Cape May-Lewes Ferry was introduced, offering another choice for crossing into New Jersey and following the shore points north from the traditional route over the Delaware Memorial Bridge.
