= Seagull (disambiguation) =

Seagulls are a grouping of sea birds in the family Laridae.

Seagull or Sea Gull may also refer to:

== Businesses ==
- Tianjin Seagull, a Chinese watch company
- Seagull Book, an American retail chain bookstore focusing on products for Mormons
- Seagull Camera, a Chinese camera company
- Seagull (company), a Canadian guitar company
- Seagull Semiconductor, a computer networking company
- British Seagull, a manufacturer of outboard engines

== Arts and entertainment ==
- The Seagull, an 1896 play by Anton Chekhov
  - The Seagull (1959 film), an Australian film
  - The Sea Gull, a 1968 drama film
  - The Seagull (1972 film)
  - The Seagull (2018 film), an American film
- A Woman of the Sea or Sea Gulls, a 1926 silent film
- The Seagull (theatre), a theatre in Pakefield, Lowestoft, Suffolk, UK
- The Seagull, a 2017 Vera Stanhope novel by Ann Cleeves
  - "The Seagull" (Vera), a 2019 TV episode adapted from the novel

== Music ==
- The Seagull (opera), an opera by Thomas Pasatieri
- Steve 'n' Seagulls, a Finnish country band

=== Songs ===
- "Seagull", a song by Bad Company from Bad Company
- "Seagull", a song by Bill Callahan from Dream River
- "Seagull", a song by Kayak from Merlin
- "Seagull", a song by Ride from Nowhere
- "Seagull", a song by Shout Out Louds from Howl Howl Gaff Gaff
- "Seagull", a song by Steeleye Span from Tempted and Tried

== Military ==
- Operation Seagull, a British military action to destroy several Nazi targets
- Operation Seagull (Ireland), a German military operation to infiltrate England

== Places ==
- Seagull Island (Tiwi Islands), Northern Territory, Australia
- Seagull Rock, small islet off south-eastern Tasmania, Australia

== Sports ==
- Brighton & Hove Albion F.C. or the Seagulls, an English football club
- Gold Coast Seagulls, an Australian rugby league team
- Helsinki Seagulls, a Finnish basketball team
- Runaway Bay Seagulls, an Australian rugby league club
- MSIT Seagulls, the sports teams of Staten Island Technical High School

== Transportation ==
=== Aviation ===
- Flygfabriken LN-3 Seagull, an amphibian kitplane produced in Sweden
- SOC Seagull, a biplane aircraft designed for the United States Navy, first produced in 1937
- Supermarine Seagull (1921), a 1920s British flying boat
- Supermarine Seagull (1948), an unrelated flying boat design, of which just two were built in the late 1940s
- Supermarine Walrus or Supermarine Seagull V, a British Walrus flying boat that operated during World War II
- "Seagull" or "Seascan", Israeli patrol airplane based on IAI Westwind

=== Maritime ===
- Sea Gull (skipjack), a historic fishing vessel
- Bell Seagull, a type of sailing boat
- HMS Seagull (1795), a 16-gun brig-sloop
- HMS Seagull (1805), a 16-gun Seagull-class brig-sloop
- HMS Seagull (1808), a 16-gun brig-sloop
- HMS Seagull (1889), a Sharpshooter-class torpedo gunboat converted to a minesweeper
- HMS Seagull (J85), a Halcyon-class minesweeper launched in 1937
- USS Sea Gull (1818), a steamer
- USS Sea Gull (1838), a survey ship
- USS Sea Gull (SP-223), a patrol vessel in commission from 1917 to 1918
- USS Sea Gull (SP-544), a patrol vessel in commission from 1917 to 1918
- USS Seagull (AM-30), a minesweeper laid down in 1918
- USS Seagull (AMS-55), a minesweeper laid down as YMS-402 in 1942

=== Rail ===
- LNER Class A4 4902 Seagull, a British LNER Class A4 steam locomotive
- Furness Railway K1 or Seagull, a type of locomotive

=== Road ===
- Seagull intersection, a three-way at-grade intersection type
- BYD Seagull, an electric subcompact hatchback

== Other uses ==
- "The Seagull" (poem), a poem by Dafydd ap Gwilym
- Seagull (gamer) or Brandon Larned, American video game streamer and retired professional Overwatch player
- Seagull manager, a manager who uses a type of poor management style
- Seagull Monument, a monument in Salt Lake City, Utah, US
- Seagull, a diacritic used in transcribing linguolabial consonants in the International Phonetic Alphabet
- Bobby Seagull, British television personality

== See also ==
- A Flock of Seagulls, a British band
- Gabbiano (disambiguation)
- Gull (disambiguation)
- HMS Seagull, a list of ships of the Royal Navy
- Jonathan Livingston Seagull, a novel by Richard Bach
- Sea eagle
- Segal
- USS Sea Gull, a list of United States Navy ships
- USS Seagull, a list of ships of the United States Navy
