= Maryland Route 363 =

State highway in the U.S. state of Maryland

Maryland Route 363
- Maryland Route 363 highlighted in red

Route information
- Maintained by MDSHA
- Length: 18.30 mi (29.45 km)
- Existed: 1927–present
- Tourist routes: Chesapeake Country Scenic Byway

Major junctions
- West end: Dead end on Deal Island
- MD 627 near Oriole; US 13 in Princess Anne
- East end: Mansion Avenue in Princess Anne

Location
- Country: United States
- State: Maryland
- Counties: Somerset

Highway system
- Maryland highway system; Interstate; US; State; Scenic Byways
← MD 362	→ MD 364

Maryland Route 363 (MD 363) is a state highway in the U.S. state of Maryland. Known for almost all of its length as Deal Island Road, the state highway runs 18.30 miles (29.45 km) from a dead end on Deal Island east to Mansion Avenue in Princess Anne. MD 363 connects Princess Anne and U.S. Route 13 (US 13) with the communities of Deal Island, Chance, and Dames Quarter on Tangier Sound in northwestern Somerset County. The state highway was constructed starting from Princess Anne around 1920, and reached Chance in the early 1930s. It was extended to Deal Island when a modern bridge to the island was constructed in 1940. MD 363 was extended to its present terminus on the island in the late 1950s.

== Route description ==
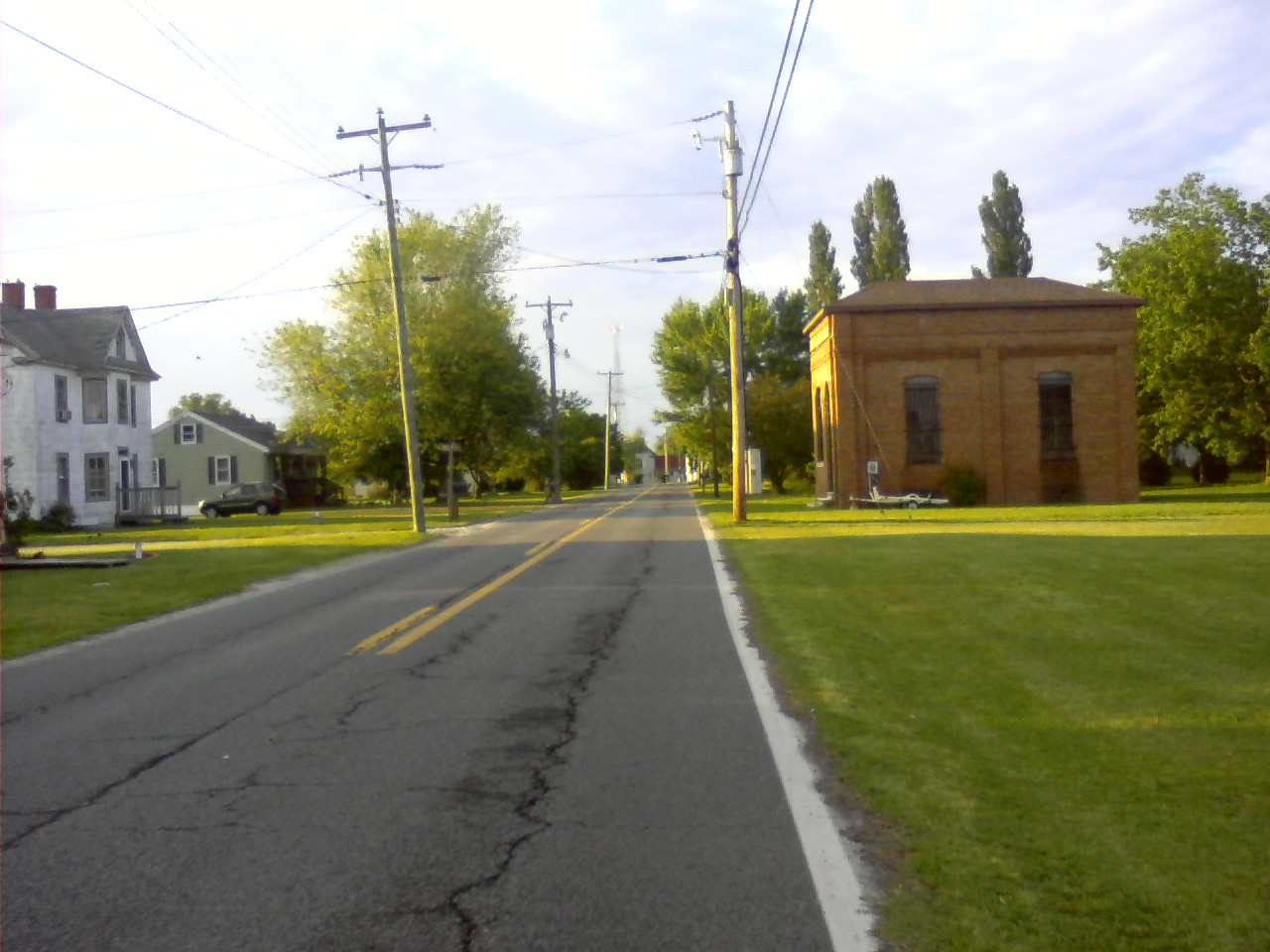
The old post office building along MD 363 on Deal Island

MD 363 begins at a dead end in the community of Wenona at the southern end of Deal Island. The state highway heads north as a two-lane undivided road, sharply curving before crossing Middle Creek. The road runs through another series of sharp curves through marshland before straightening out and passing St. John's Methodist Episcopal Church and the old post office building, two examples of buildings on the island preserved as part of the Deal Island Historic District. The route passes a boat ramp accessed from Ralph Abbott Road before a high-level bridge carries it over Upper Thorofare, a strait between Laws Cove and Tangier Sound. On the north side of the bridge, MD 363 intersects MD 363A, the northern approach to the previous bridge to Deal Island, before passing through the community of Chance, the site of Rock Creek Methodist Episcopal Church. After passing Haines Point Road, which leads to a large public boat ramp, the state highway continues northeast across the two branches of Rock Creek and through more marshland before entering Dames Quarter. MD 363 traverses Dames Quarter Creek and passes through Deal Island Wildlife Management Area.

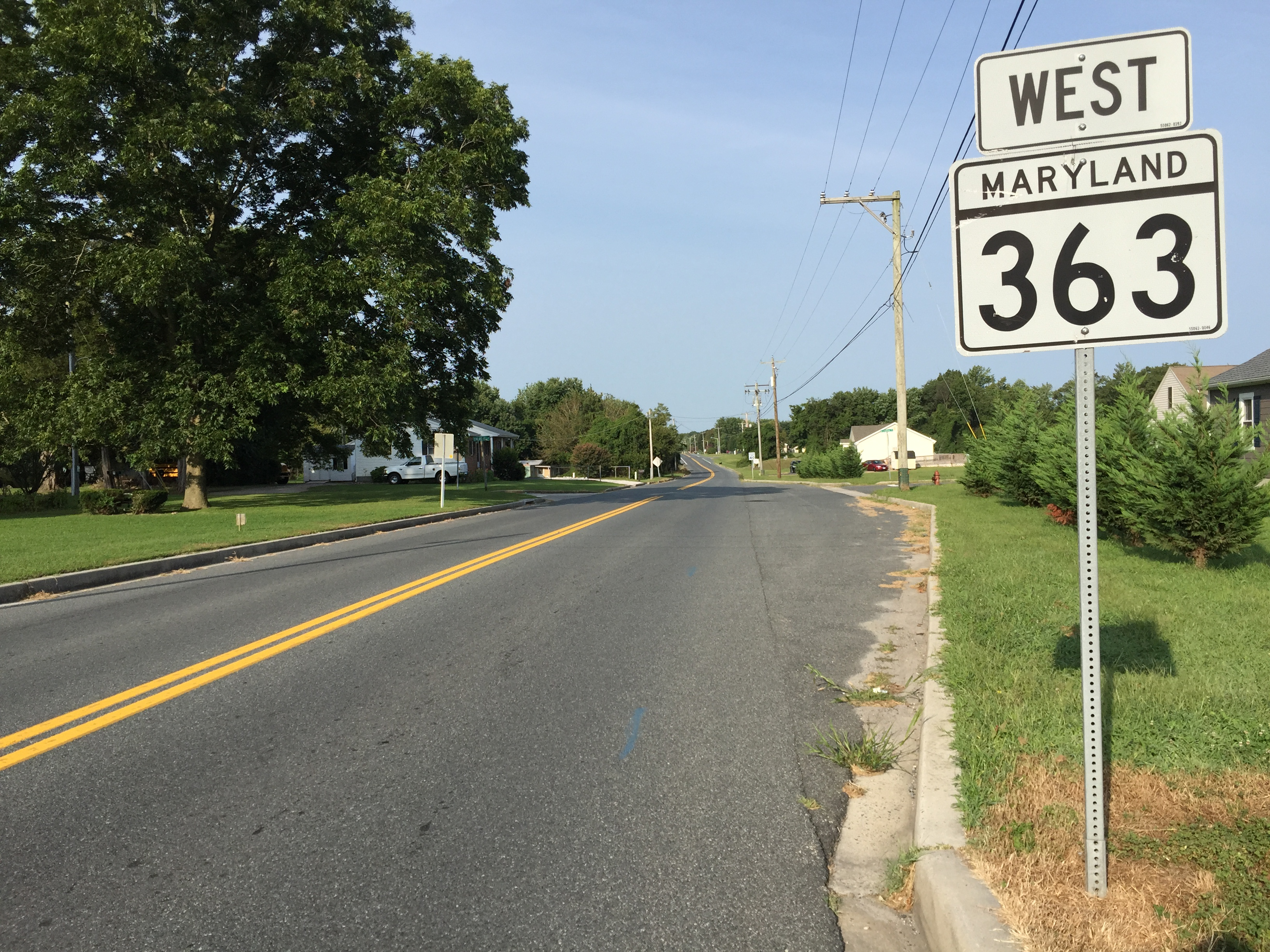
View west along MD 363 in Princess Anne

After passing through the wildlife management area, MD 363 heads east on a 5-mile (8.0 km) straight through the hamlets of St. Stephens and Monie. The state highway bypasses the village of Oriole, which is accessed by Oriole Back Road from the west and MD 627 (Oriole Road) from the east. After passing to the south of Venton, which features the historic home Panther's Den and All Saints Church, MD 363 traverses the Chesapeake Forest Lands. On the east edge of the forest, the road curves northeast and then east toward Princess Anne, passing farmland, several residential subdivisions, and the Flying W Airport. Immediately after crossing the Manokin River, MD 363 reaches its intersection with US 13 (Ocean Highway). The state highway continues east into the town of Princess Anne as Manokin Avenue, where it reaches its eastern terminus at Mansion Avenue, named for the Teackle Mansion one block to the south. The roadway continues east through the Princess Anne Historic District toward MD 675 (Somerset Avenue) in the center of the town.

== History ==
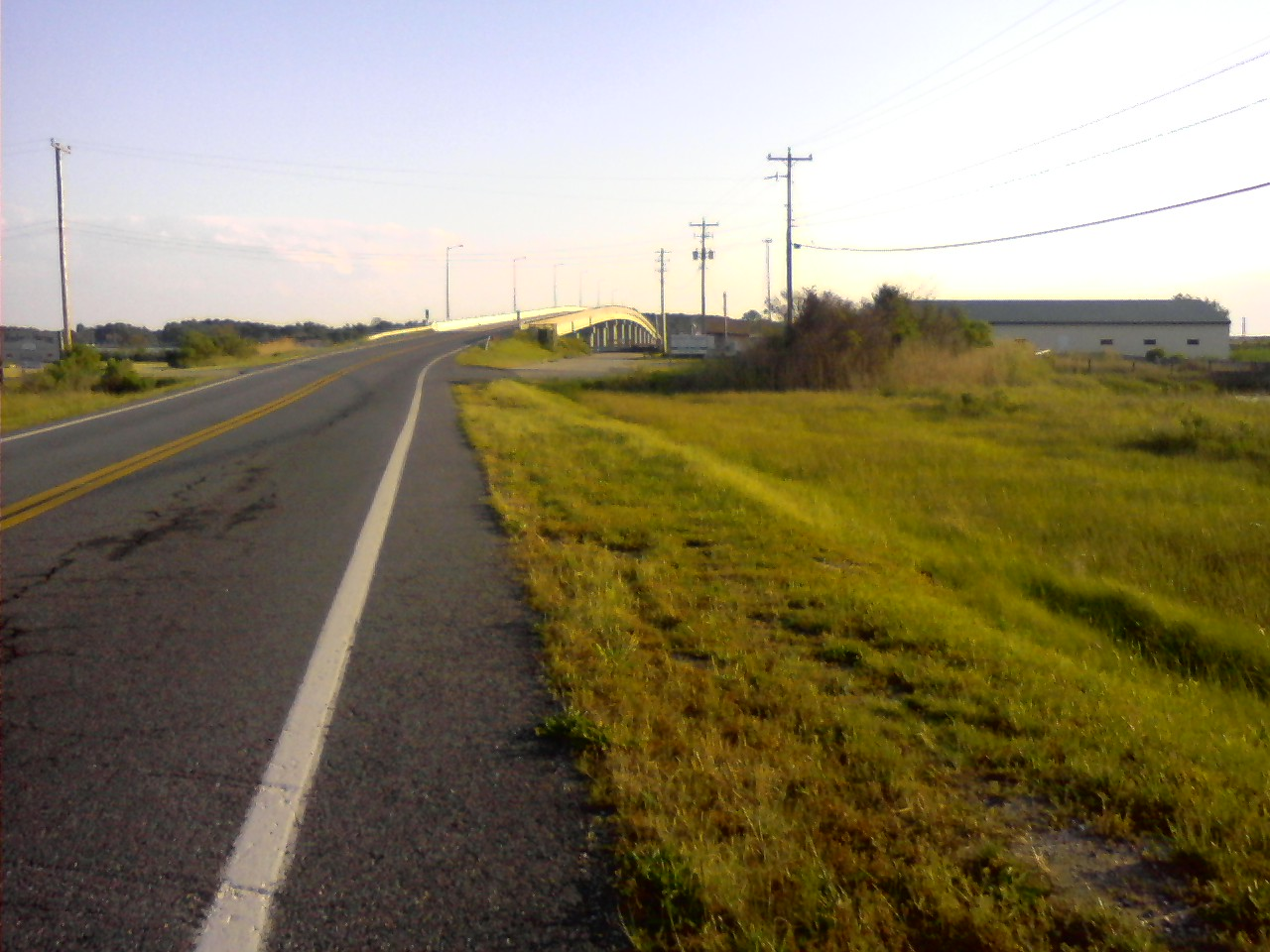
MD 363's bridge over Upper Thorofare from the mainland side, with MD 363A to the right

MD 363 had been built from Princess Anne to the eastern end of the 5-mile (8.0 km) straight by 1921. The state highway reached Monie by 1923 and Dames Quarter in 1926. MD 363 was under construction west to Chance in 1930 and completed by 1933. The state highway's western terminus remained at Chance until 1940. MD 363 was extended to the other side of Upper Thorofare when a modern bridge replaced a causeway that had been in place since at least 1903. The state highway was widened in stages from Princess Anne between 1950 and 1958, culminating in the extension of MD 363 to Wenona in 1958. MD 363 originally continued east from its present terminus in Princess Anne along Mansion Avenue and Prince William Street to end at MD 675. The state highway assumed its present eastern terminus around 1985. The present bridge across Upper Thorofare was completed in 1987.

== Junction list ==
The entire route is in Somerset County.

Location	mi	km	Destinations	Notes
Deal Island	0.00	0.00	Dead end	Western terminus
Oriole	13.09	21.07	MD 627 west (Oriole Road) – Oriole	Eastern terminus of MD 627
Princess Anne	18.19	29.27	US 13 (Ocean Highway) – Salisbury, Pocomoke	
Princess Anne	18.30	29.45	Manokin Avenue east / Mansion Avenue south	Eastern terminus
1.000 mi = 1.609 km; 1.000 km = 0.621 mi

== Auxiliary route ==
MD 363A is a 0.06-mile (0.097 km) spur that parallels the westbound side of MD 363 just north of the highway's bridge over Upper Thorofare between the mainland and Deal Island.
