= Maryland Route 627 =

State highway in Maryland, United States

Maryland Route 627
- Oriole Road

Route information
- Maintained by MDSHA
- Length: 2.48 mi (3.99 km)
- Existed: 1938–present

Major junctions
- West end: Crab Island Road in Oriole
- East end: MD 363 near Venton

Location
- Country: United States
- State: Maryland
- Counties: Somerset

Highway system
- Maryland highway system; Interstate; US; State; Scenic Byways
← MD 625	→ MD 631

Maryland Route 627 (MD 627) is a state highway in the U.S. state of Maryland. Known as Oriole Road, the state highway runs 2.48 miles (3.99 km) from the intersection of Oriole Back Road and Crab Island Road in Oriole east to MD 363 near Venton. MD 627 was constructed and assigned in the mid-1930s.

== Route description ==
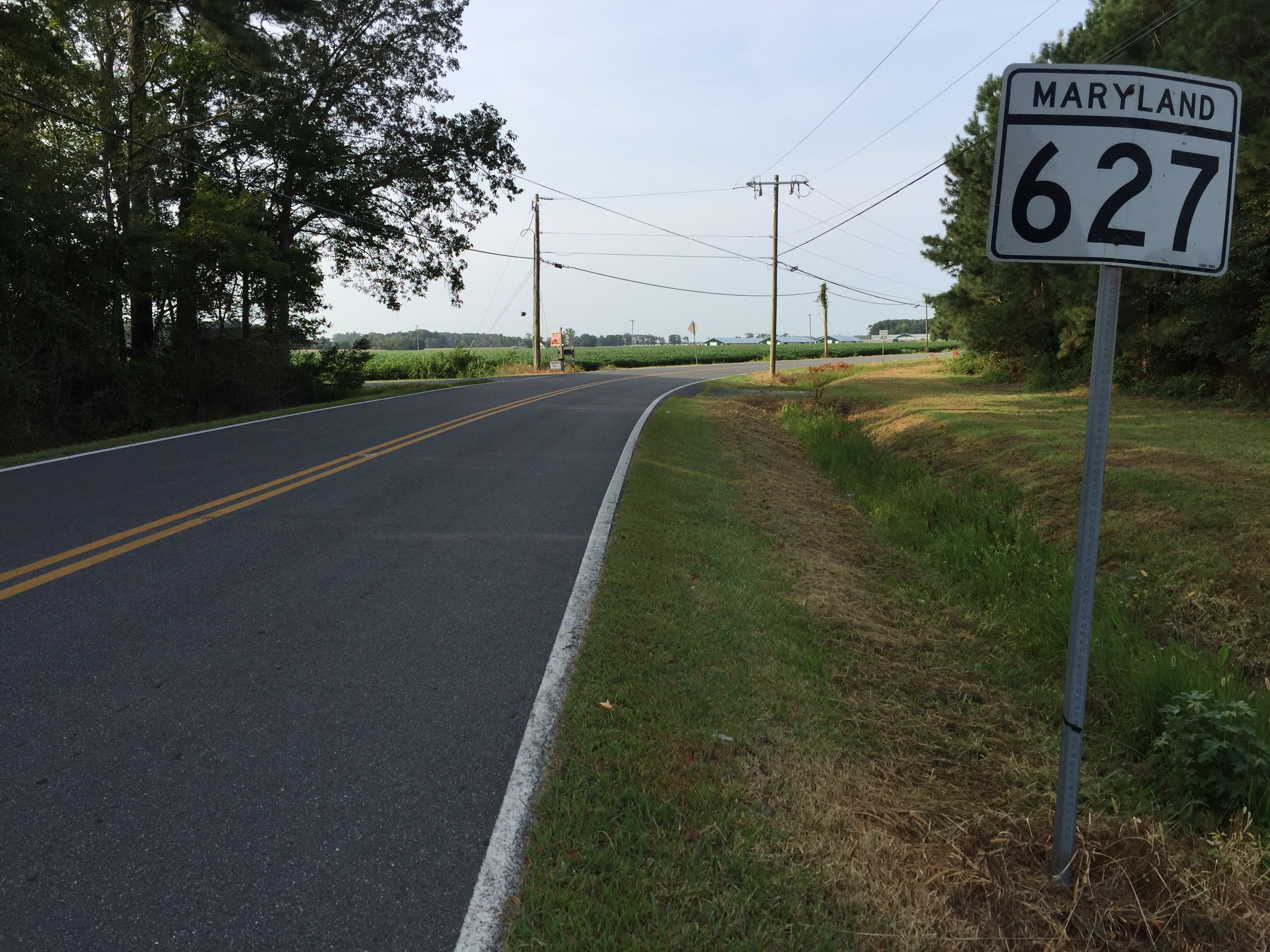
View west along MD 627 at MD 363 near Venton

MD 627 begins at the intersection of Crab Island Road and Oriole Back Road in the village of Oriole. Crab Island Road heads south toward the Manokin River, while Oriole Back Road heads northwest toward an intersection with MD 363 at Monie. MD 627 heads east as a two-lane undivided road through the village and makes a sharp turn to the south where Jerusalem Road heads north. The state highway curves east through forest. After passing Locust Point Road, which leads south to the Manokin Historic District, MD 627 veers northeast through farmland to its eastern terminus at MD 363 (Deal Island Road).

== History ==
Oriole Road was reconstructed by the Maryland State Roads Commission in 1934 when they took over maintenance of highways in Somerset County. The highway was brought into the state system and designated MD 627 in 1938.

== Junction list ==
The entire route is in Somerset County.

Location	mi	km	Destinations	Notes
Oriole	0.00	0.00	Crab Island Road south / Oriole Back Road west	Western terminus
Venton	2.48	3.99	MD 363 (Deal Island Road) – Princess Anne, Deal Island	Eastern terminus
1.000 mi = 1.609 km; 1.000 km = 0.621 mi
