= USS Sea Gull =

USS Sea Gull may refer to the following ships of the United States Navy:

- USS Sea Gull (1818), a steamer acquired in 1822 and sold in 1840
- USS Sea Gull (1838), a survey ship acquired in 1838 and lost in 1839
- USS Sea Gull (SP-223), a patrol vessel in commission from 1917 to 1918
- USS Sea Gull (SP-544), a patrol vessel in commission from 1917 to 1918
