= Gabbiano =

Gabbiano (Italian for "seagull") may refer to:-

Aircraft

- Ambrosini SAI.10 Gabbiano, a floatplane version of the Ambrosini SAI.10 Grifone
- CANT Z.501 Gabbiano, a single engined flying boat in service 1934-50
- Meteor S-21 Gabbiano, a two-seat trainer aircraft.
- Teichfuss Gabbiano, a glider

Places

- Castel Gabbiano, Lombardy, Italy

Ships

- Gabbiano-class corvette, a class of 59 ships that served with the Regia Marina and Kriegsmarine during World War II
- SS Gabbiano, a number of ships with this name
- MV Gabbiano, a re-engined Victory ship in service 1951-70
