= USS Saluda =

U.S. Navy sailing yacht

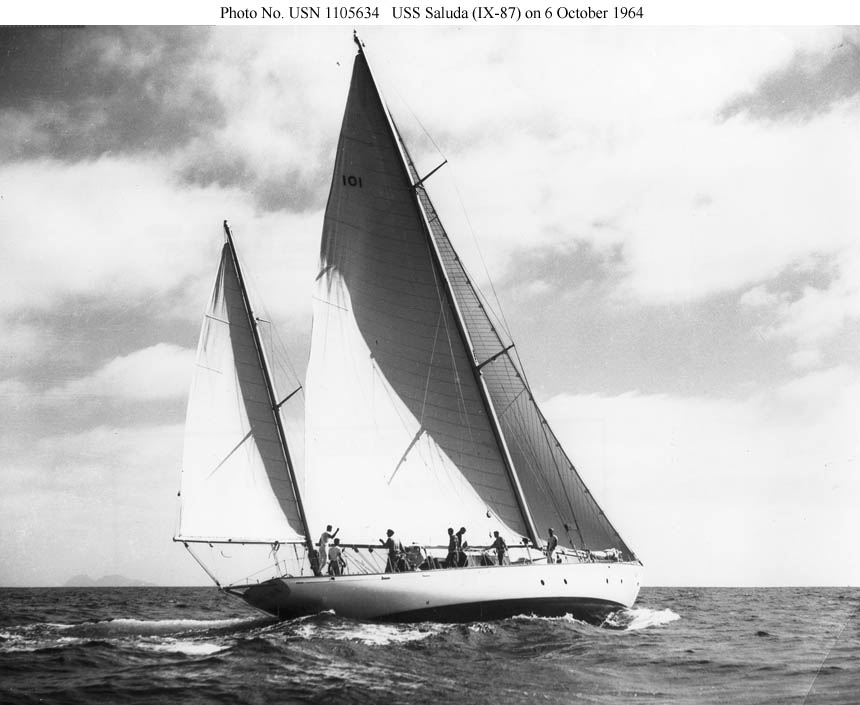
- Saluda (IX-87) underway, 6 October 1964

History
- Name: Odyssey (1938-1942); Saluda (1942-1978); Odyssey (1978- )
- Namesake: Saluda River in South Carolina
- Builder: Henry B. Nevins, Inc., City Island, Bronx
- Launched: 1938
- Acquired: 31 July 1942
- Commissioned: 20 June 1943
- Decommissioned: 7 January 1947
- In service: 7 January 1947
- Reclassified: YAG-87, 29 June 1968
- Stricken: 15 April 1974
- Status: Sail training vessel

General characteristics
- Type: Yawl
- Displacement: 92 long tons (93 t)
- Length: 89 ft (27 m)
- Beam: 18 ft (5.5 m)
- Draft: 10 ft 8 in (3.25 m)
- Propulsion: Sails/auxiliary diesel engine
- Speed: 9 knots (17 km/h; 10 mph)
- Complement: 10

USS Saluda (IX-87) was a wooden-hulled, yawl-rigged yacht of the United States Navy.

== Yacht Odyssey ==
Odyssey was built by Henry B. Nevins at City Island, New York in 1938 for Barbara Whitney Henry to be a gift for her husband. The yacht with U.S. official number 237958 with home port as New York, N.Y. was acquired by the Navy at Miami, Florida 31 July 1942.

== Service history ==
=== U.S. Navy ===
Saluda was assigned to the Port Everglades Section Base under the administrative control of the Commandant, 7th Naval District and remained there for outfitting. She was commissioned on 20 June 1943 and assigned to the Bureau of Ordnance for experimental work at the Underwater Sound Laboratory, at Fort Trumbull, New London, Connecticut. In December, she sailed south to St. Thomas, Virgin Islands, and thence proceeded to various Caribbean ports.

In the spring of 1944, the vessel was used to test the theory developed by Maurice Ewing and J. Lamar Worzel of a SOFAR channel, or deep sound channel. A hydrophone was hung from Saluda to detect signals from a second ship setting off explosive charges up to 900 nmi (1,000 mi; 1,700 km) miles away. Proof of the theory led to a development to use the SOFAR channel to locate downed air crews by detecting the explosion of a small charge close to the channel axis for detection and computation of location by shore stations. The long distance travel of low frequency sound in the channel was applied to the Sound Surveillance System (SOSUS) implemented in 1952 and continuing as a classified undersea surveillance system until 1991 when the mission and nature of the system was declassified. Elements of the system remain in operation.

In the summer of 1944, the ship was under overhaul at Mayport, Florida. In August, Saluda was ordered back to New London and duty with the Sound Laboratory. She continued operations there until she was decommissioned and placed in service in October 1945, to be retained at New London under the operational control of the Commandant, 3rd Naval District.

Saluda was recommissioned on 20 May 1946 for further service as an experimental test vessel. She engaged in hydrographic work with the Woods Hole Oceanographic Institute, Woods Hole, Massachusetts, until September and then returned to New London for duty at the Sound Laboratory through December. Again decommissioned and placed in service on 7 January 1947, Saluda remained at New London under district control until transferred to the 11th Naval District on 8 January 1948. On 26 May, she entered the Thames Shipyard for overhaul preparatory to sailing for the west coast.

Saluda departed from New London on 16 June and arrived at San Diego, California, in July to begin a long career of service with the Naval Electronics Laboratory. Operating as a silent platform, she was used in tests on experimental sonar equipment and techniques developed for undersea warfare. On 29 June 1968, she was reclassified YAG-87.

Saluda was placed out of service (date unknown), and struck from the Naval Vessel Register, 15 April 1974.

Saluda was reassigned to the Athletic and Recreation Department at Whidbey Island, Naval Air Station in Washington. During the next 4 years, she was described as the consummate party boat during summer time. A skipper and mate were assigned at the beginning of the summer and parties lasted until the fall.

=== Sea Scouts ===
Reverting to the name Odyssey, the yacht found a new home with the Pacific Harbors Council of the Boy Scouts of America in 1978, and now serves as a sail training vessel with the Sea Scouts of Tacoma, Washington.
