= USS Seagull =

USS Seagull may refer to the following ships of the United States Navy:

- USS Seagull (AM-30), a minesweeper laid down on 15 June 1918 by the Gas Engine and Power Co., Morris Heights, The Bronx, New York.
- USS Seagull (AMS-55), a minesweeper laid down as YMS-402 on 24 July 1942 by Henry B. Nevins, Inc., City Island, The Bronx, New York.
