= Herman Ipsen Lund =

Danish-American boatbuilder (1890–1981)

Herman Lund
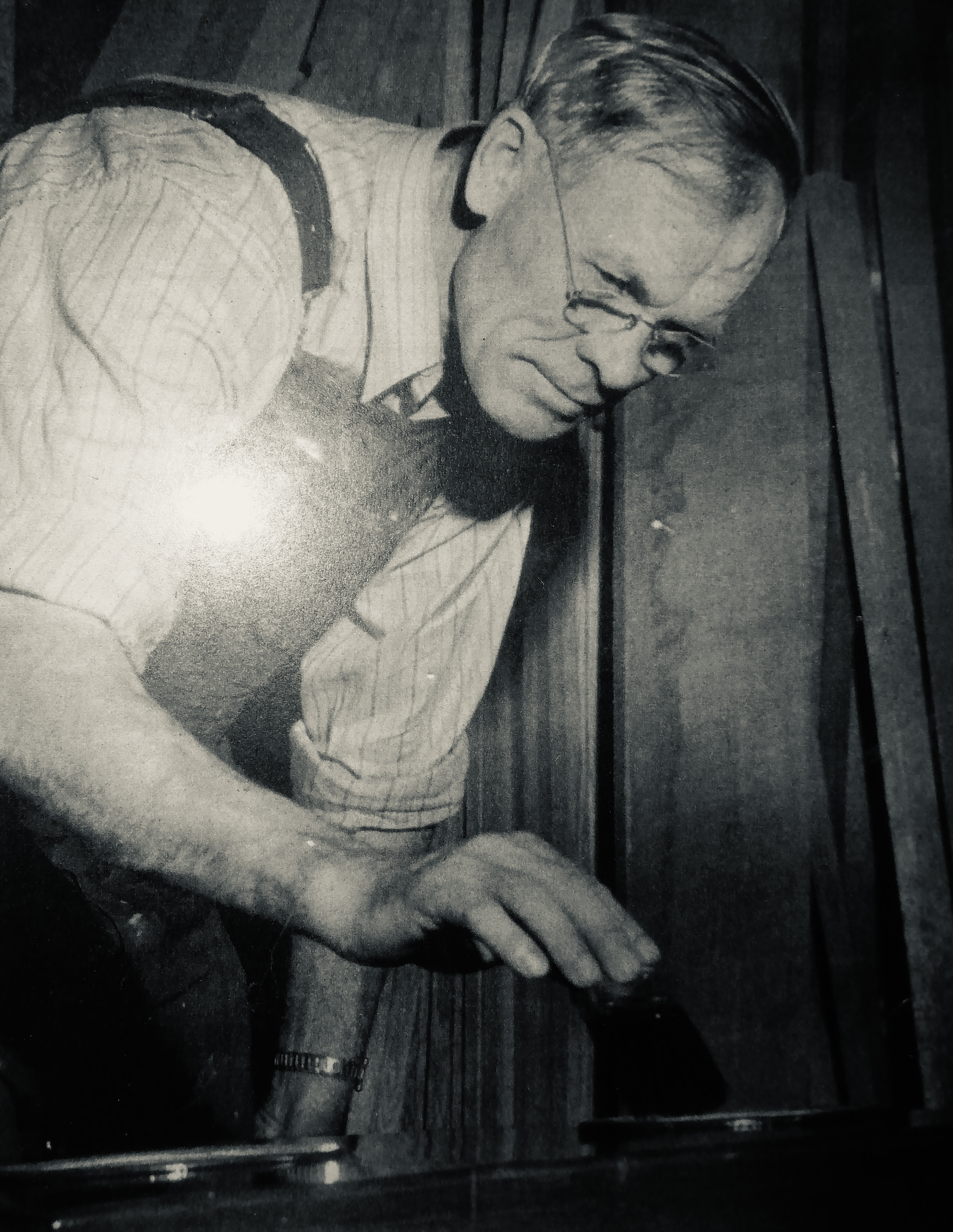
- Born: Herman Ipsen Lund; August 22, 1890; Bornholm, Denmark
- Died: June 30, 1981 (aged 90); Erie, Pennsylvania, U.S.
- Occupations: Boat builder and designer
- Spouse: Amber Brinck Lund
- Children: 3
- Parents: Mathias Lund (father); Jane Marie Ipsen (mother)

Herman Ipsen Lund (August 22, 1890 – June 30, 1981) was a Danish-American boat builder and designer known for his sailboats and powerboats.

== Personal life ==
Lund was born on the island of Bornholm, Denmark in 1890. His father. Mathias Lund, was captain of the three-masted schooner, Veset, sailing between Denmark and ports in England, Sweden, and Russia.

Lund apprenticed to a boat builder at age 14 in his native Denmark. At age 18, he moved to Erie, Pennsylvania, where he obtained a boat-building job. At age 21, he and his uncle, Hans Hansen, founded Hansen & Lund Boatbuilders.

His training allowed him to transfer lines from half-hull models onto the full-sized project, a skill not universal among other builders. Lund extended this skill to create his own designs, which comprised half the boats he built. He became widely recognized.

He married Amber O. Brinck in 1914, whose father, Charles, was assigned to the life-saving station at Mill Creek, Pennsylvania.

== Career ==
Lund became the sole proprietor of Hansen & Lund in 1913, upon the retirement of his uncle. In that year, the company obtained work in the restoration of Matthew Perry’s brig, Niagara, in Erie, Pennsylvania. Lund oversaw later refits of Niagara. His company performed maintenance work on the USS Michigan (later the Wolverine) during its active duty in Erie.

During Prohibition, Lund built nine Coast Guard patrol boats to pursue rum-runners operating between the U.S. and Canadian waters, some of which fell into the hands of the smugglers. Lund also built a few fast boats for men who paid in cash and often used the alias, "John Smith".

During the 1930s and 1940s, Lund built steam-powered fishing tugs ranging from 50 to 60 feet (15 to 18 m), part of a fleet of more than 100 in the late 1920s. Lund's yard maintained may of the tugs in the fleet.

During World War II, Lund, along with most of his men, worked on minesweepers at the Stadium Yacht Building Company in Cleveland, Ohio. Lund served as superintendent over the construction of 27 vessels there.

By 1950, Lund estimated that he had built about 150 boats both power and sail, which he continued to produce until his retirement in 1964, when he handed over the business to his son, Charles. His son ran the business as a boat repair shop until his death in 1969, when it passed to the next generation. Ultimately, the shop changed hands several times before it was razed in 2016 to make room for a parking lot.

== 1961 list of boats ==
Lloyds reference number, yacht name, length, designer, type, year built

- # 385 "Apache" 39' Philip L. Rhodes -- 27 Sloop 1939
- #1467 "Chanter" 42' Charles Mower -- Ketch 1939
- #1507 "Carina" Philip L. Rhodes -- Yawl 1938
- #2163 "Norbadore II" 39' Philip L. Rhodes -- 27 Sloop 1940
- #2133 "Eleanor III" 55' Herman Lund -- Bridge Deck Cruiser 1930
- #2355 "Elf" 35' Philip L. Rhodes -- Sloop 1938
- #2453 "Enigma" 45' Chester A. Nedwidek -- Yawl 1931
- #2467 "Falcon" 35' S.S. Crocker -- Auxiliary Sloop 1933
- #3329 "Hallson II" 52' E.H. Scott -- Powerboat 1920
- #3778 "Iris" 30' William Atkin -- Sloop 1924
- #4370 "Fleetwing" 34' Philip L. Rhodes -- Lake One Design Sloop
- #6663 "Red Wing" 39' Philip L. Rhodes -- 27 Sloop 1940
- #5802 "Nyorth" 50' Sparkman & Stephens -- Powerboat. 1955
- #5885 "Mary Louise II" 42' Herman Lund -- Powerboat
- #6491 "Time Out " 55' A.M. Deering -- Powerboat 1954
- #6655 "Red Feather" 47' Charles Mower -- Powerboat 1928
- #6695 "Sunshine" 65' Herman Lund -- Powerboat 1928
- #8576 "Trident" 55'8" John G. Alden -- Yawl 1930
- #8607 "Tropic Bird" 37' Annapolis Yacht Sales -- Sloop 1956
- #8641 "Twilight II" 54' Charles Mower -- Powerboat 1920
- #8980 "Henrietta" 50' William Hand -- Powerboat 1918
- #9281 "Fine Feather" 34' Philip L. Rhodes -- Lake One Design Sloop 1938

== Known surviving boats ==
- "Curlew" 34 foot cutter sailboat restored at Arlet Boatworks LLC of Erie, Pennsylvania designer Charles G. MacGregor. Built 1938.
- "Njorth" 50 foot powerboat located in Erie, Pennsylvania. Built 1950
- "Zorba" 47 foot powerboat located in Charleston, South Carolina. Built 1930
- "Eleanor III" 51 foot powerboat located in Onancock, Virginia. Built 1930
- "Elf" 35 foot sailboat located in Cleveland, Ohio. Built 1949
- "Bureau of Water" 38 foot powerboat located in Erie, Pennsylvania being restored by Erie Historical Society. Built 1929.
