= Venton, Maryland =

Unincorporated community in Maryland, United States

- Unincorporated community
- Location within Maryland
- Coordinates: 38°11′48″N 75°46′45″W
- Country: United States
- State: Maryland
- County: Somerset
- Elevation: 7 ft (2.1 m)
- Time zone: UTC-5 (Eastern (EST))
  - Summer (DST): UTC-4 (EDT)
- ZIP code: 21853
- Area codes: 410, 443, and 667
- GNIS feature ID: 591470

Venton is an unincorporated community in Somerset County, Maryland, United States.

It consists of a small number of farms and homesteads around Venton Road, and is the home of All Saints Church at Monie and Panther's Den, both of which are on the National Register of Historic Places.

== Geography ==
Venton is a rural community with Maryland Route 363 (locally known as Deal Island Road) acting as the primary road throughout. The community is roughly at the halfway point between Princess Anne and Oriole, as well as a mile north of the Manokin River's mouth into the Chesapeake Bay.

== Demographics ==
The US Census groups Venton with the city of Princess Anne, a census district which houses a population of 11,437 in 2020.

== Transport ==
U.S. Route 13, itself a main road for Princess Anne, is located 3 miles away from the center of Venton, Rail transport, however, is nonexistent in Venton, and the closest rail line is located in Princess Anne (currently owned by Norfolk Southern).

Salisbury Regional Airport currently provides the closest air service to Venton in both commercial and general aviation services.
