= AMS-55 =

AMS-55 may refer to:

- USS Seagull (AMS-55), battleship
- NBS AMS 55 a.k.a. Abramowitz and Stegun, a mathematics textbook
