= Henry B. Nevins, Incorporated =

Yacht builder

Henry B. Nevins Incorporated was wooden-hull yacht builder in City Island, New York founded in 1907 by Henry B. Nevins. Nevins was a master yacht builder and author on vessel construction who apprenticed at the island's Charles L. Seabury & Company. Later he purchased the nearby Byles Yard to increase his company's acreage. Henry B. Nevins Inc. built custom sail and motor yachts and racing craft for affluent clients, but also small tugs and barges for commercial customers. Run by a perfectionist, Nevins' company seasoned its own lumber, designed and machined its own fittings, made its own glue, and balanced spars by weighing shavings. As a result, Nevins built more cup-winning yachts than anyone else in the industry.

In 1939, Henry B. Nevins Inc. was awarded $15,000 by the United States Navy for the best design of a 54-foot (16 m) motor torpedo boat, used by George Crouch. During World War II, Henry B. Nevins Inc. built 24 YMS-1 class minesweepers for the U.S. Navy and four aircraft-rescue boats as part of the war effort. A few yachts built by Nevins before World War II, such as USS Saluda served the Navy during the war. Following World War II the yard resumed private and commercial shipbuilding. Nevins died in 1950. Except for three minesweepers built for the Belgian Navy in 1953–54, the shipyard was unable to compete with postwar European shipyards able to make yachts at 1/3 the cost. His widow sold the yard in 1954 and it ceased operations in 1962. The former site is now occupied by the City Island School. Today little remains of the yard except for marine railways and slipways only visible at low tide.

Nevins built the Fishers Island One Design. Designed by Charles Mower these sloops had a 24-foot (7.3 m) hull with 15 feet (4.6 m) on the waterline and 7-foot (2.1 m) beam. The first boats were gaff rigged sloops. Twenty-five were built.

== Ships built by Henry B. Nevins, Incorporated ==
- Brilliant (schooner) - 1932
- Columbia (1958 yacht) - 1958 Winner of the 1958 America's Cup.
- USS Grackle (AMS-13) - 1943
- USS Magpie (AMS-25) - 1943
- USS Robin (AMS-53) - 1953
- USS Saluda (IX-87) - 1938
- USS Seagull (AMS-55) - 1943
- USS Tamarack (SP-561) - 1915
