= USS Vidofner =

Patrol vessel of the United States Navy

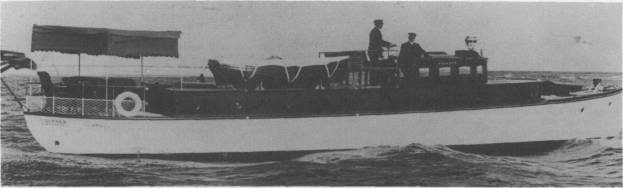
- Vidofner as a private yacht sometime between 1906 and 1917.

History

United States
- Name: USS Vidofner
- Namesake: Previous name retained
- Builder: Murray and Tregurtha, South Boston, Massachusetts
- Completed: 1906
- Acquired: 19 May 1917
- Commissioned: 7 June 1917
- Decommissioned: 7 December 1917
- Fate: Returned to owners
- Notes: Operated as private yacht Vidofner 1906-May 1917 and from December 1917

General characteristics
- Type: Patrol vessel
- Tonnage: 27 gross register tons
- Length: 58 ft 9 in (17.91 m)
- Beam: 11 ft (3.4 m)
- Draft: 3 ft 6 in (1.07 m) mean
- Propulsion: Steam engine
- Speed: 14 knots
- Complement: 10
- Armament: 1 × 1-pounder gun; 1 × machine gun

USS Vidofner (SP-402) was a United States Navy patrol vessel in commission from June to December 1917.

== Construction and acquisition ==
Vidofner was built as a private steam yacht of the same name in 1906 by Murray and Tregurtha at South Boston, Massachusetts. On 19 May 1917, the U.S. Navy acquired her from her owners - S. H. Freihefer, H. M. Pfiel, and E. G. Schmidneiser - for use as a section patrol vessel during World War I. She was commissioned at the Philadelphia Navy Yard at Philadelphia, Pennsylvania, as USS Vidofner (SP-402) on 7 June 1917.

== Operations from Philadelphia ==
Vidofner underwent an overhaul and made a short trial run down the Delaware River to test her engines, then was assigned to local patrol duties at the Philadelphia Navy Yard and commenced her initial patrol on 31 July 1917. During her first night on patrol, she arrested two men in a rowboat and eight men in a cutter as they tried to enter the reserve basin area, which was a forbidden zone. When the ten men were returned to their respective ships, they were identified and released.

On 2 August 1917, Vidofner picked up a man in a skiff "who was acting suspiciously." When the man was identified by the navy yard's quartermaster, he, too, was released.

At 11:15 hours on 5 August 1917, an aide from the office of the Commandant, 4th Naval District, arrived at Vidofner's dock and requested that she make ready to get underway at once. Accordingly, an inspection party boarded Vidofner and she headed downstream toward the troop transport USS Henderson (Transport No. 1), which had run aground earlier that day. Early on 6 August, after the inspection party had been transferred to the stranded troopship, Vidofner headed back to the navy yard and relieved the patrol boat USS Little Aie (SP-60) on patrol at 08:00 hours. Two hours later, Vidofner stopped the tug Sam Weller near a restricted area and ordered her out. When the tug failed to comply quickly enough, Vidofner fired two shots in the air, which was sufficient prodding to hurry Sam Weller on her way.

Vidofner remained on patrol duty at the Philadelphia Navy Yard until she was assigned to northern submarine net patrol at the mouth of the Delaware Bay on 31 August 1917.

== Operations in the Delaware Bay ==
Vidofner's first month on patrol in the lower Delaware Bay was uneventful.

On 8 October 1917, a heavy storm swept across Delaware Bay, threatening to scatter the flotilla on patrol duty there. Vidofner dragged anchor at 07:30 hours and fouled the patrol boat USS Sea Gull (SP-544) before getting underway and clearing Sea Gull. After taking "a bad pounding" in the rough seas, Vidofner dropped both anchors and moored off Brown Shoal Buoy in the hope of riding out the storm. The storm did not let up. Sea Gull, unable to get underway, drifted off into the pre-dawn darkness on 9 October 1917, dragging her anchors and sending out SOS signals. Ordered to make for the breakwater at Lewes, Delaware, where some measure of shelter was afforded, Vidofner got underway and made haven there on 9 October 1917. Sea Gull also arrived there by 08:15 hours on 9 October under tow.

Vidofner shifted her base of operations to Cape May, New Jersey, on 13 October 1917. From there, she performed submarine net patrol duties in the Delaware Capes area until she was decommissioned at Essington, Pennsylvania, near Philadelphia, on 7 December 1917 and returned to her owners.
