= USS Robin (AMS-53) =

U.S. Navy vessel

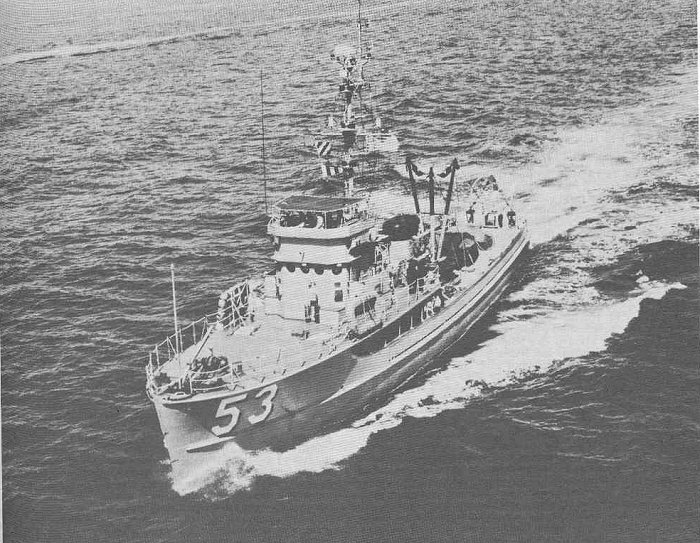

History

United States
- Name: USS YMS-311
- Builder: Henry B. Nevins, Inc.; City Island, Bronx
- Laid down: 7 May 1943
- Launched: 6 October 1943
- Sponsored by: Mrs. John W. Bradbury
- Completed: 5 November 1943
- Commissioned: 6 November 1943
- Decommissioned: 31 July 1946
- In service: 31 July 1946, Naval Reserve training ship
- Renamed: USS Robin (AMS-53), 1 September 1947
- Namesake: the robin bird
- Out of service: February 1952
- Recommissioned: February 1952
- Reclassified: MSC(O)-53, 7 February 1955
- Decommissioned: 13 December 1957
- In service: 13 December 1957, Naval Reserve training ship
- Out of service: Summer 1961
- Stricken: 1 August 1961
- Honors and awards: 5 battle stars, World War II
- Fate: Fate unknown

General characteristics
- Class & type: YMS-135 subclass of YMS-1-class minesweepers
- Displacement: 380 (full load)
- Length: 136 ft (41 m)
- Beam: 24 ft 6 in (7.47 m)
- Draft: 10 ft (3.0 m)
- Propulsion: 2 × 880 bhp General Motors 8-268A diesel engines; 2 shafts
- Speed: 13 knots (24 km/h)
- Complement: 29
- Armament: 1 × 40 mm gun mount; 2 × 20 mm guns; 2 × depth charge tracks; 2 × depth charge projectors

USS Robin (MSC(O)-53/AMS-53/YMS-311) was a YMS-1-class minesweeper of the YMS-135 subclass built for the United States Navy during World War II.

== History ==
Robin was laid down as YMS-311 on 7 May 1943 by Henry B. Nevins, Inc. of City Island, Bronx; launched 6 October 1943; sponsored by Mrs. John W. Bradbury; completed on 5 November 1943; and commissioned on 6 November 1943.

Following shakedown in Chesapeake Bay, YMS-311 headed south and on 23 December reported for duty to Commander, Caribbean Sea Frontier. From January to mid-May 1944, she served in the Curaçao-Aruba area, escorting freighters and oilers to and from convoy rendezvous points. Then ordered to the Pacific Ocean, the YMS proceeded to Panama, thence continued on to California and Hawaii. Arriving at Pearl Harbor at the end of July, she underwent further training in August, then steamed west to the Admiralties.

On 11 October, YMS-311 departed Seeadler Harbor in TU 79.12.1. Seven days later, she arrived at the entrance to Leyte Gulf and began sweeping operations to clear the way for the invasion force which followed. Through the 19th, despite Japanese aerial resistance, she continued to sweep in Leyte Gulf; then, on the 20th, joined LST group Baker on the departure line off Blue Beach 2 -- Orange Beach 1 and assumed duty as control ship.

YMS-311 remained off that assault area north of Dulag until the 24th when she got underway to return to New Guinea and the Admiralties. At the end of the year, she again departed Seeadler Harbor for the Philippines and another amphibious landing. On 9 January 1945, assigned to TG 79.9, she repeated her control ship role as U.S. Army troops were landed on Luzon near the town of Lingayen.

Through the month and into February, the YMS continued to support operations in the Philippines. In March, she moved to Ulithi, whence she departed on the 19th to participate in Operation Iceberg, the invasion of the Ryukyus. On 25 March, she arrived off Kerama Retto and began sweeping operations. Toward the end of the month, she swept off the Hagushi beaches, then retired to Kerama Retto on 1 April as troops were landed on those beaches. Replenished, she resumed sweeping on the 2d, and by the 6th had cleared areas off Keise Shima and Ie Shima. On the morning of the 6th, a flight of 35 enemy planes attacked her formation. Three of the Vals chose her as their target, two others chose a nearby ship.

YMS-311 took the five under fire and splashed three. One penetrated the AA defenses, hit the minesweeper on the forecastle deck, then skidded across the bow and plunged into the water off the portside, killing one and wounding two of the ship's crew en route.

YMS-311 retired to Kerama Retto. After temporary repairs she swept that anchorage area until the 11th, then sailed for Saipan to complete her repairs.

On 26 May YMS-311 returned to Okinawa and into June swept the channels between Okinawa and Kerama Retto. From the 13th to the 23d, she swept off Saki Shima, then returned to Kerama Retto. In July she shifted to Buckner Bay, operated in that area, with occasional runs to Kerama Retto into August, and on the 6th of that month departed the Ryukyus for the Philippines.

At the end of the month, she returned to Buckner Bay and in September moved north to the Japanese home islands for postwar sweeping operations, which continued well into December. On 28 December she departed Sasebo for the Marianas, whence she continued on across the Pacific Ocean to Hawaii and California.

At the end of May 1946, YMS-311, reassigned to the U.S. Atlantic Fleet, transited the Panama Canal and proceeded to Philadelphia and New York City. Decommissioned on 31 July, she was subsequently placed in service as a Naval Reserve training ship at Tompkinsville, New York. On 1 September 1947, YMS-311 was renamed and redesignated Robin (AMS-53).

Through the end of the decade and into the 1950s, Robin continued to serve reservists in the 3rd Naval District. In February 1952, she was recommissioned and transferred back to the active fleet. Assigned initially to the 5th Naval District, she was homeported at Charleston in June 1953 as a unit of Mine Squadron 4, Mine Division 42, operated from there until February 1954. She then moved back to the Chesapeake Bay area for overhaul and duty with the Mine Warfare School at Yorktown, Virginia. In January 1955, Charleston again became her homeport and for the next 2 years Robin resumed operations which ranged from Nova Scotia to the Caribbean.

Redesignated MSC(O)-53 on 7 February 1955, Robin operated from Panama City, Florida, from April to October 1957. On 28 October she sailed for the west coast to return to Naval Reserve training duty.

She arrived at Tacoma, Washington, on 7 December and was decommissioned and placed in service as a training ship for the 13th Naval District on 13 December. She remained on that duty until placed out of service in the summer of 1961. Her name was struck from the Naval Vessel Register on 1 August 1961.

== Awards and honors ==
YMS-311 earned five battle stars for her World War II service.
