= Henry B. Nevins =

Henry B. Nevins (1878–1950) was a master yacht builder and author on vessel construction in City Island, New York. Born in New York in 1878, Nevins wanted to be a doctor but was too frail, so he decided to work Gas Engine & Power Company before deciding upon his hobby, shipbuilding by apprenticing at Charles L. Seabury Company in City Island, New York. At age 29, Nevins bought the nearby Hansen Boat Yard in City Island in 1907 and founded Henry B. Nevins, Incorporated. Later Nevins would purchase the nearby Byles Yard to increase his acreage. Nevins' company built custom cruising and racing craft as well as minesweepers during World War II as part of the war effort.

Nevins collaborated with naval architect George Crouch on many vessels, including the APBA Gold Cup winner of 1924 and 1925 Baby Bootlegger, said to be the most beautiful wooden boat ever built.

Nevins was seriously injured in a fall at his shipyard in 1949 and died in 1950. In the last months of his life, he would ask to be carried out to his yacht Polly just to feel the swell of the sea again.
