= USS Grackle (AMS-13) =

Minesweeper of the United States Navy

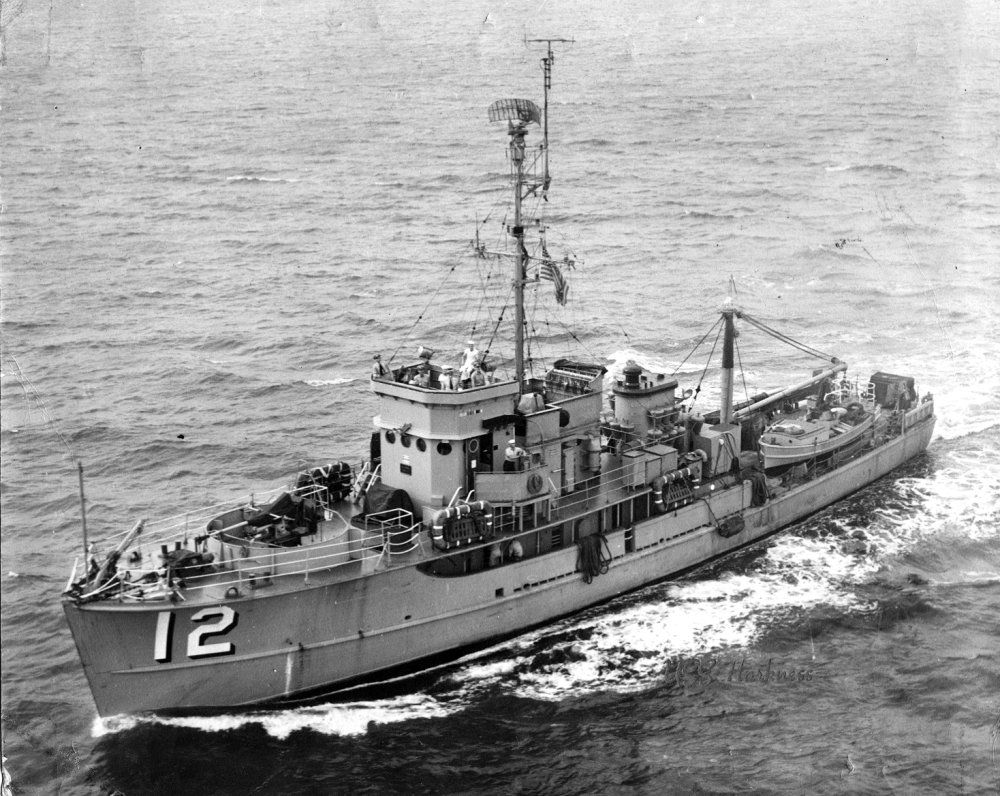
- A YMS-1-class minesweeper

History

United States
- Name: USS YMS-312
- Builder: Henry B. Nevins, Inc.; City Island, New York
- Laid down: 7 June 1943
- Launched: 9 November 1943
- Sponsored by: Mrs. W. G. Kroepke
- Completed: 4 December 1943
- Commissioned: 6 December 1943
- Renamed: USS Grackle (AMS-13), 18 February 1947
- Namesake: the grackle bird
- Reclassified: MSC(O)-13, 7 February 1955
- Decommissioned: 11 October 1957
- Stricken: 1 March 1963
- Fate: Transferred to Brazil, 19 April 1963

Brazil
- Name: Juruena (M14)
- Acquired: 19 April 1963
- Fate: Unknown

General characteristics
- Class & type: YMS-135 subclass of YMS-1-class minesweepers
- Displacement: 270 t.
- Length: 136 ft (41 m)
- Beam: 24 ft 6 in (7.47 m)
- Draft: 8 ft (2.4 m)
- Propulsion: Two 1,000 shp diesel engines, two shafts
- Speed: 13 knots (24 km/h)
- Complement: 32
- Armament: 1 × 40 mm gun

USS Grackle (MSC(O)-13/AMS-13/YMS-312) was a YMS-1-class minesweeper of the YMS-135 subclass built for the United States Navy during World War II.

== History ==
The second Grackle was laid down as YMS-312 on 7 June 1943 by Henry B. Nevins, Inc., City Island, Bronx; launched 9 November 1943 and sponsored by Mrs. W. G. Kroepke; completed 4 December 1943; and commissioned 6 December 1943.

YMS-312 put in at Key West, Florida, 4 February 1944 after shakedown and following sound training there steamed to Curaçao, arriving 17 February. Escort, minesweeping and patrol duties in Caribbean waters occupied her until she got underway 1 September 1944 for San Pedro, Los Angeles, and Hawaii.

Her duty in the Pacific terminated 9 April 1946 when YMS-312 steamed eastward through the Panama Canal for overhaul at Charleston, South Carolina. On 15 May the minesweeper arrived Norfolk, Virginia, for operations in the Chesapeake Bay until November 1947 when she shifted her base to Charleston, South Carolina. Operations out of this base included tours of service for the Naval Schools Mine Warfare at Yorktown, Virginia, and the U.S. Naval Mine Countermeasures Station at Panama City, Florida.

Periodically Grackle engaged in minesweeping operations off Massachusetts near Martha's Vineyard, completing this duty 27 June 1951 when she reported to the Mine Warfare School at Yorktown, Virginia, for duty as a school ship.

On 1 March 1952 she sailed for the Caribbean to join the Mine Force in combined fleet maneuvers off Puerto Rico, Cuba, and the Virgin Islands, and returned to Yorktown, Virginia, near the end of March. Subsequent years were spent in alternate periods of operations that included school ship duties at Yorktown, amphibious exercises along the coast of North Carolina, and mine countermeasures operations along the Eastern seaboard.

Redesignated coastal minesweeper MSC(O)-13 in February 1955, Grackle was placed in service in reserve 16 September 1957 and was decommissioned on 11 October 1957 at Philadelphia, Pennsylvania. The veteran minesweeper was struck from the Naval Vessel Register on 1 March 1963 and transferred to Brazil on 19 April 1963 as Jurvena (M 14).

Her ultimate fate is unknown.
