= Brilliant (schooner) =

Coordinates: 41°21′45″N 71°57′55″W

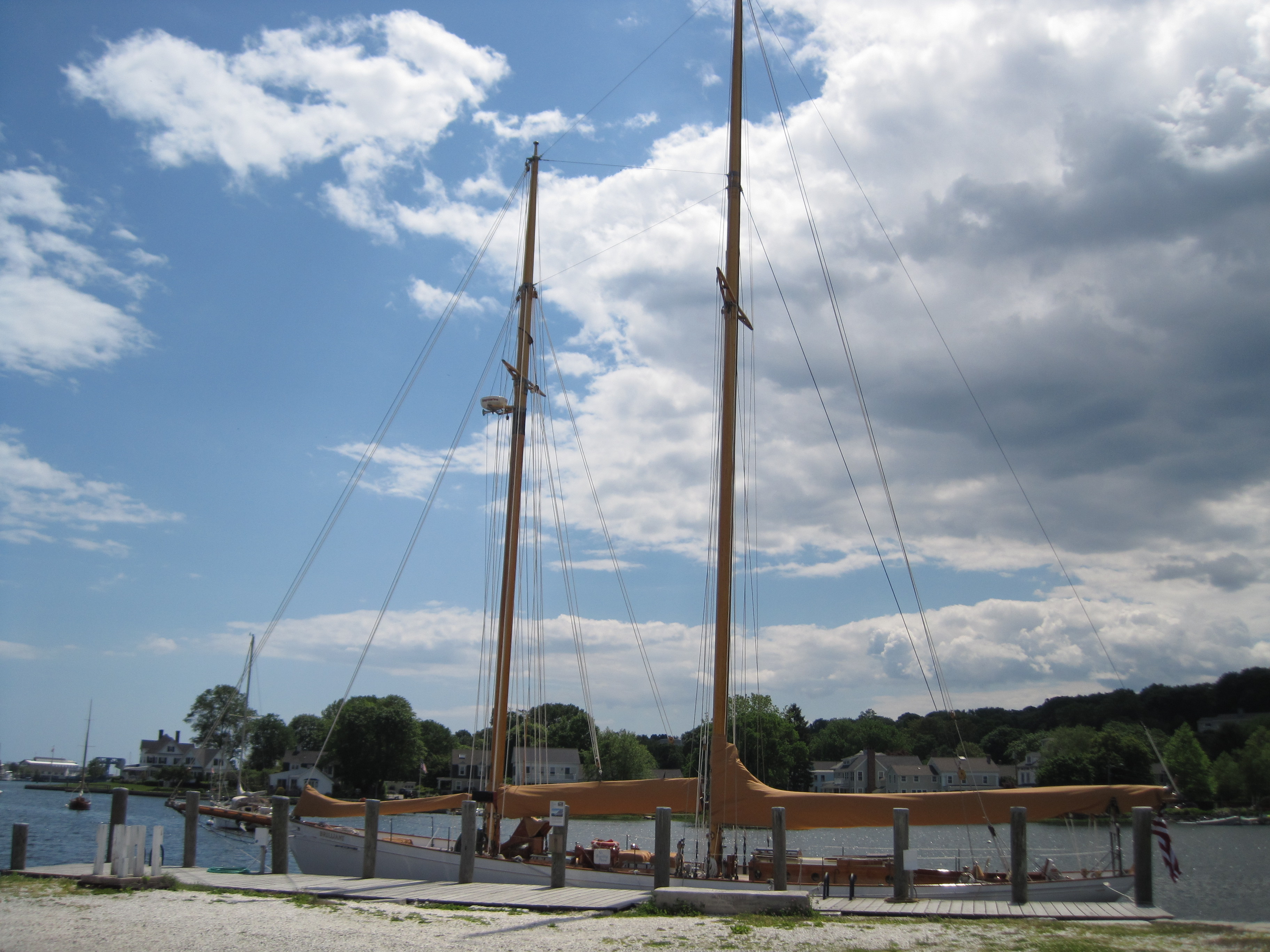

History

United States
- Owner: Mystic Seaport
- Builder: Henry B. Nevins, Inc., City Island, Bronx
- Completed: 1932
- Status: Museum ship

General characteristics
- Tonnage: 30
- Length: 61 ft 6 in (18.75 m)
- Beam: 14 ft 8 in (4.47 m)
- Height: 81 ft (25 m)
- Draft: 9 ft (2.7 m)
- Installed power: Sail, Diesel Engine
- Propulsion: Yanmar Diesel
- Sail plan: Schooner
- Capacity: 12

Brilliant is a schooner located at Mystic Seaport in Mystic, Connecticut, United States. Brilliant was built in 1932 on City Island, Bronx, by Henry B. Nevins Yard to a design by Olin Stephens of Sparkman & Stephens for Walter Barnum. Brilliant was built as an ocean racing yacht, and on her maiden voyage crossed the Atlantic Ocean in just over 15 days, 1 hour and 23 minutes, a record for a sailing yacht of her size. Brilliant ran from Nantucket Lightship to Bishop Rock Light, England.

According to the Sparkman & Stephens blog, Brilliant was designed to a "rigorous" standard.

During World War II, the schooner was acquired by the U.S. Coast Guard and used to patrol the New England coast for enemy submarines. During this time, two machine guns were mounted on Brilliant's deck.

After the war, Brilliant was purchased by the accomplished sailor Briggs Cunningham, who attempted to increase her speed by outfitting her with a larger rig. The new rig consisted of taller masts, a self-tacking forestaysail, but maintained the gaff rig. During this time, Cunningham also invented what became known as the cunningham, a tie-down for the tack (the lower, forward corner of the mainsail) that allows the sail to maintain a more efficient shape. This makes Brilliant the first boat to have the device, now standard on racing boats of all sizes. Despite his modifications, Cunningham was unable to significantly improve the Brilliant's speed and he donated her to Mystic Seaport in 1953. The seaport once again changed her rig. They maintained the larger rig that Cunningham installed but changed the gaff mainsail to a Bermuda/Marconi rigged main. This is said to have happened to make sailing her easier under her new mission.

Mystic Seaport now uses her as an offshore classroom and features her as part of their collection of watercraft. This use was a requirement of Cunningham's gift to Mystic Seaport.

== See also ==
- List of schooners
