= Baby Bootlegger =

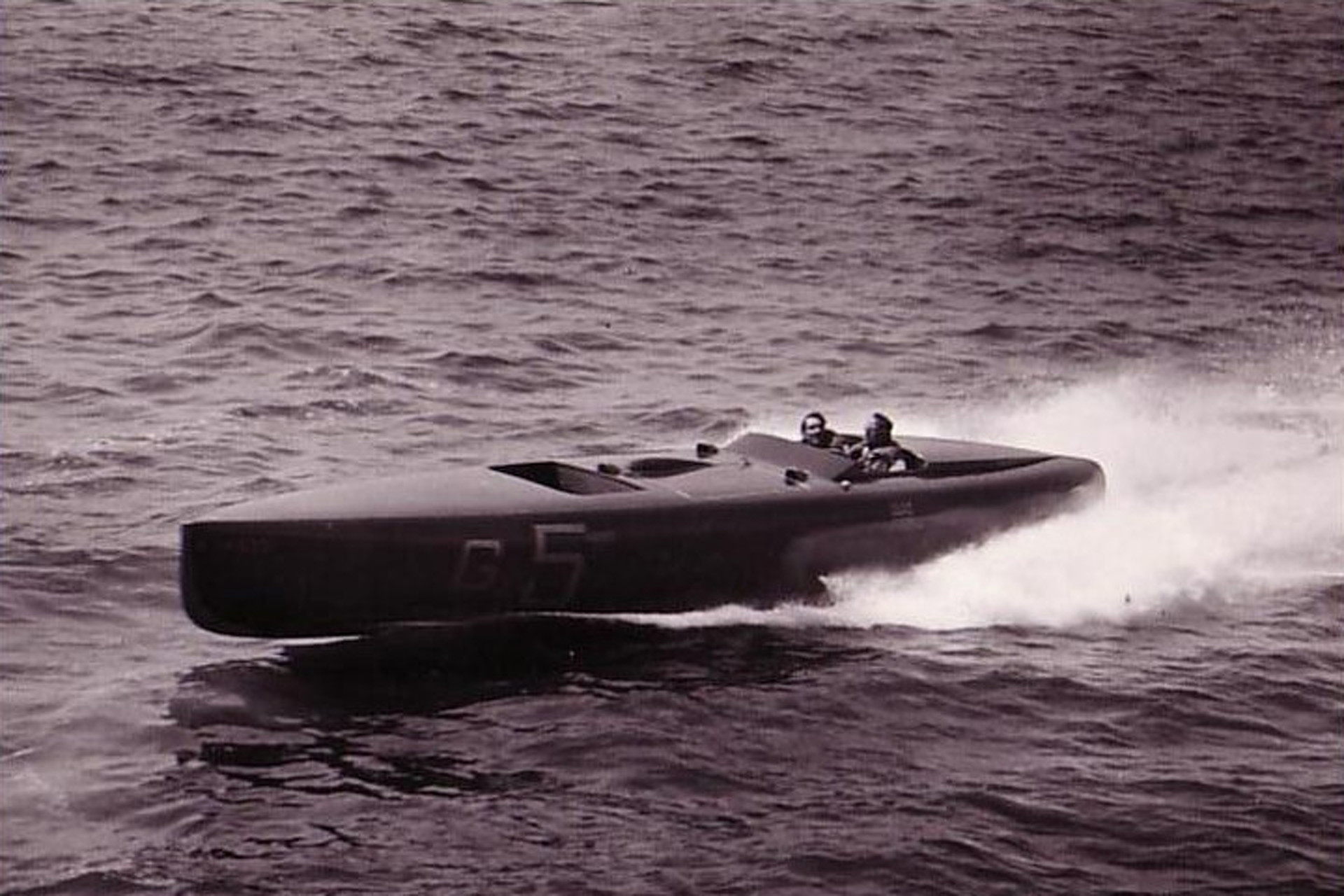
- Baby Bootlegger racing in 1925
- Designer(s): George Crouch
- Builder: Henry Nevins
- Launched: 1924
- Owner(s): Caleb Bragg, R.B. Timberlake, C.W. Wragge, Mark Mason, Tom Mittler

Racing career
- Skippers: Caleb Bragg
- Notable victories: 1924 and 1925 APBA Gold Cup

Specifications
- Displacement: 3,200 lb (1,500 kg)
- Length: 29 ft 10 1/2 in (910.6 cm)
- Beam: 5 ft 10 1/2 in (179.1 cm)

Baby Bootlegger is an American wooden-built speedboat. It was designed by George Crouch for Caleb Bragg in early 1924, and was built by Henry Nevins. Bragg won the APBA Gold Cup in it in both 1924 and 1925. It was fitted with a 220-horsepower converted Hispano Suiza aircraft engine dating from the First World War.
