= Dames Quarter, Maryland =

- CDP
- Coordinates: 38°10′26″N 75°54′23″W
- Country: United States
- State: Maryland
- County: Somerset

Area
  - Total: 18.24 sq mi (47.24 km^{2})
  - Land: 11.88 sq mi (30.76 km^{2})
  - Water: 6.36 sq mi (16.48 km^{2})
- Elevation: 3.3 ft (1 m)

Population (2020)
  - Total: 142
  - Density: 12.0/sq mi (4.62/km^{2})
- Time zone: UTC−5 (Eastern (EST))
  - Summer (DST): UTC−4 (EDT)
- ZIP code: 21821
- Area code: 410
- FIPS code: 24-21550
- GNIS feature ID: 0584010

Dames Quarter is a census-designated place (CDP) in Somerset County, Maryland, United States. The population was 188 at the 2000 census. It is included in the Salisbury, Maryland-Delaware Metropolitan Statistical Area.

== Geography ==
Dames Quarter is located at 38°10′26″N 75°54′23″W (38.173887, −75.906291).

According to the United States Census Bureau, the CDP has a total area of 18.3 square miles (47 km^{2}), of which 12.4 square miles (32 km^{2}) is land and 5.8 square miles (15 km^{2}) (31.91%) is water.

Portions of Dames Quarter are located in the Deal Island Wildlife Management Area.

== Demographics ==
Historical population
Census	Pop.	Note	%±
2000	188		—
2020	142		—
U.S. Decennial Census

As of the census of 2000, there were 188 people, 84 households, and 54 families residing in the CDP. The population density was 15.1 inhabitants per square mile (5.8/km^{2}). There were 132 housing units at an average density of 10.6 per square mile (4.1/km^{2}). The racial makeup of the CDP was 84.04% White, 11.70% African American, 2.13% Native American, 0.53% Asian, and 1.60% from two or more races.

There were 84 households, out of which 22.6% had children under the age of 18 living with them, 48.8% were married couples living together, 10.7% had a female householder with no husband present, and 35.7% were non-families. 32.1% of all households were made up of individuals, and 10.7% had someone living alone who was 65 years of age or older. The average household size was 2.24 and the average family size was 2.85.

In the CDP, the population was spread out, with 19.1% under the age of 18, 8.0% from 18 to 24, 23.9% from 25 to 44, 30.3% from 45 to 64, and 18.6% who were 65 years of age or older. The median age was 45 years. For every 100 females, there were 97.9 males. For every 100 females age 18 and over, there were 117.1 males.

The median income for a household in the CDP was $41,458, and the median income for a family was $44,464. Males had a median income of $50,000 versus $36,875 for females. The per capita income for the CDP was $19,448. About 10.4% of families and 11.2% of the population were below the poverty line, including none of those under the age of eighteen and 35.1% of those 65 or over.
