= Panther's Den =

Historic house in Maryland, United States

- U.S. National Register of Historic Places
- Location within Maryland Location within the United States
- Location: Drawbridge Rd., Venton, Maryland
- Coordinates: 38°12′12″N 75°47′25″W
- Area: 8 acres (3.2 ha)
- Built: 1775
- NRHP reference No.: 84001872
- Added to NRHP: March 22, 1984

Panther's Den, also known as Kolheim House, is a historic home located at Venton, Somerset County, Maryland, United States. It is a 1 1/2-story, Flemish bond brick house with a steeply pitched, wood-shingled gable roof. It was originally constructed in the second quarter of the 18th century, enlarged late in the 18th century, and remodeled on the interior between 1830 and 1850. Also on the property is a pyramidal-roofed dairy, a board-and-batten tack house, and family burial plot.

Panther's Den was listed on the National Register of Historic Places in 1984.
