= SS Gabbiano =

A number of steamships were named Gabbiano, including

- SS Gabbiano (1919), built as a sailing ship by Societa Construzione e Navales Velieri, Viareggio. Later fitted with an auxiliary steam engine.
- SS Gabbiano (1923), in service with Achille Lauro, Naples 1934–40
