= Seagull Island (Tiwi Islands) =

Island of the Tiwi Islands in Northern Territory, Australia

Coordinates: 11°07′02″S 130°20′00″E

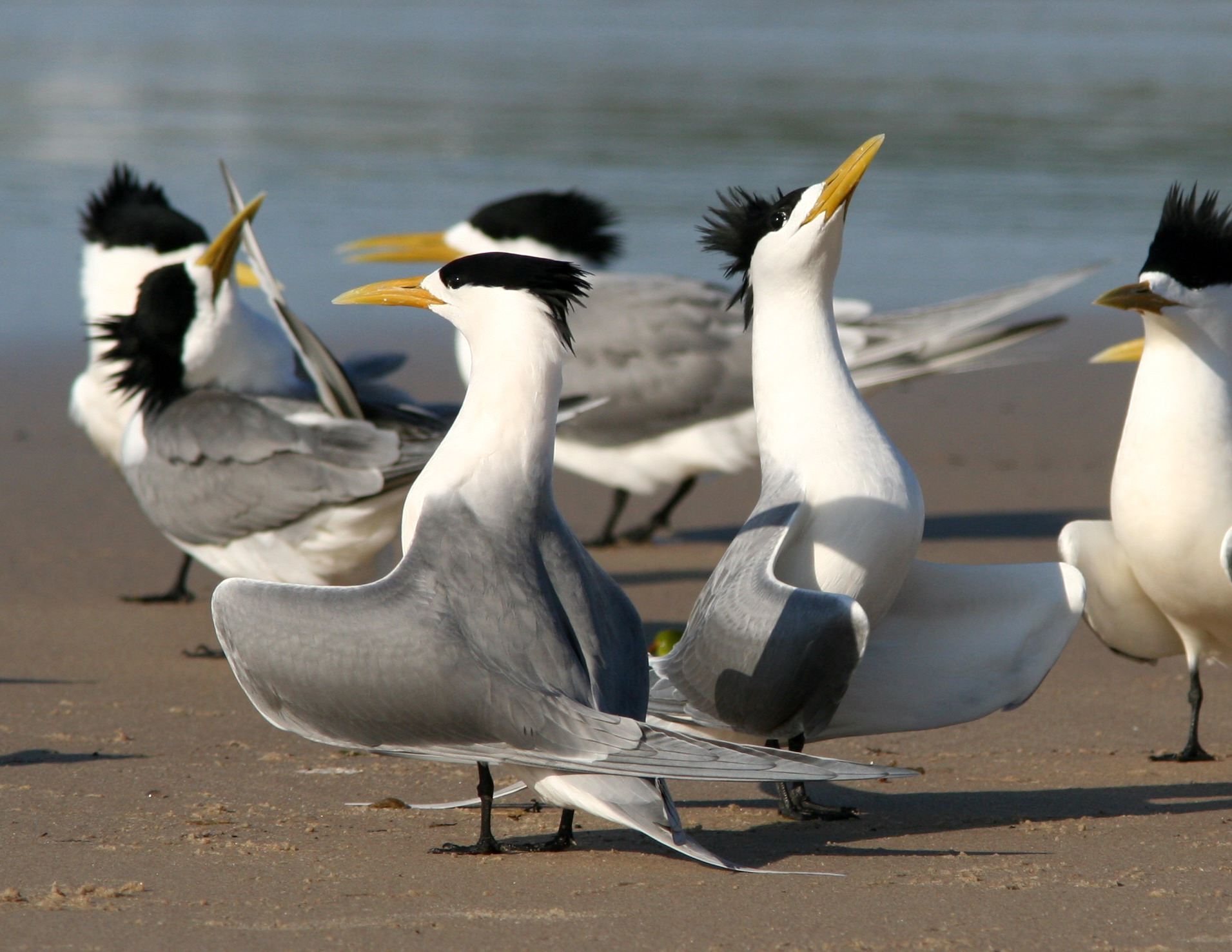
The Island is an important breeding site for greater crested terns

Seagull Island is a 58 ha linear sand island, about 2.5 km long, lying 4 km off Cape Van Diemen on the north-west coast of Melville Island, in the Tiwi Island group, in the Northern Territory of Australia. It is an important breeding site for seabirds.

== Description ==
The island is vegetated with grass and vines. It is a nesting site for olive ridley sea turtles. Land tenure is Aboriginal freehold land held by the Tiwi Aboriginal Land Trust.

== Birds ==
The island has been identified by BirdLife International as an Important Bird Area (IBA) because it supports the largest colony of greater crested terns in the world, with up to 29,000 nests recorded there. Tern eggs are harvested by the island's traditional owners. Up to 800 silver gulls also nest on the island, and possibly bridled and roseate terns. Large numbers of migrant common and little terns roost there, as do smaller numbers of frigatebirds and brown boobies.
