= Deal Island, Maryland =

- CDP
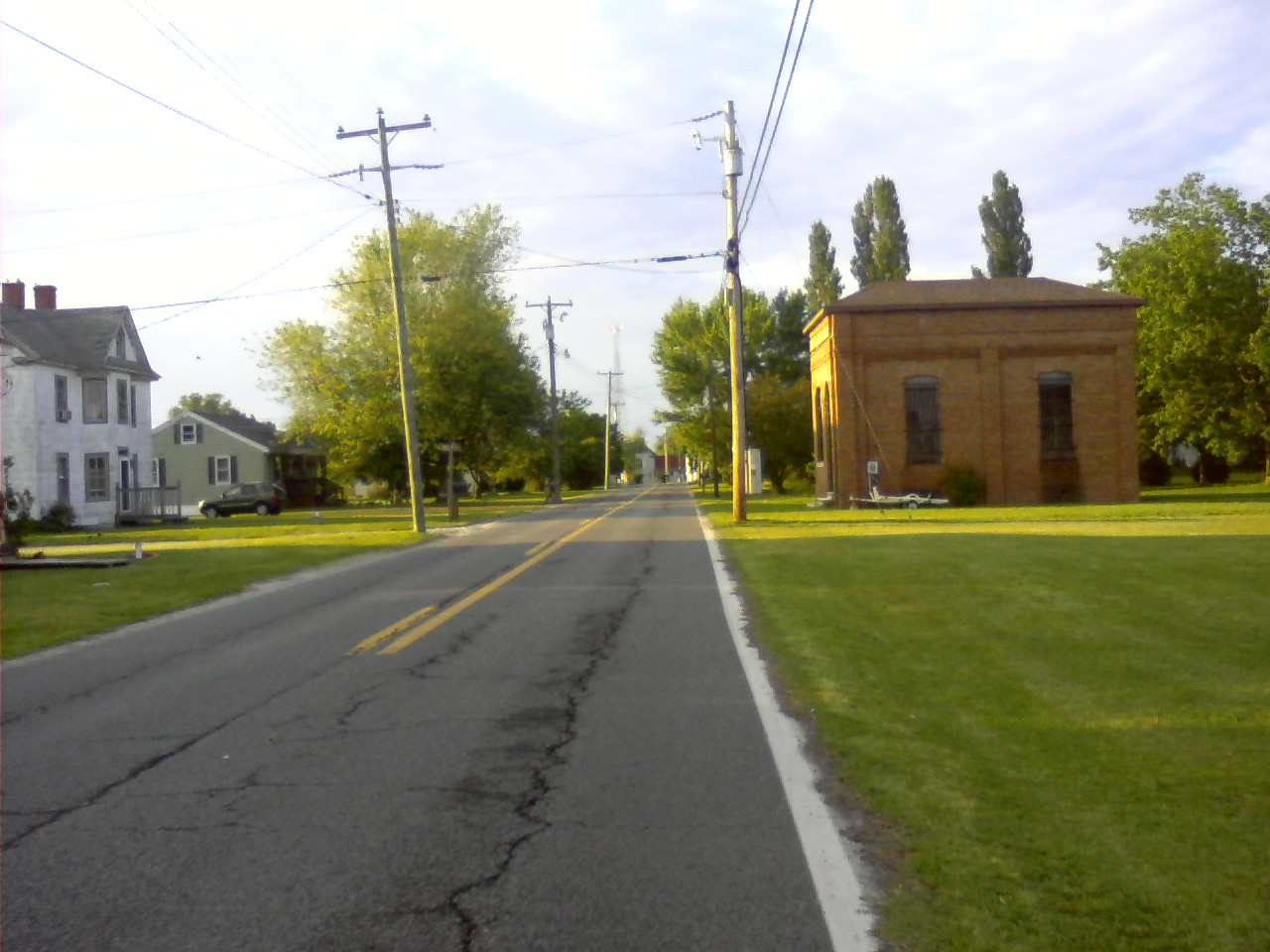
- The old bank along MD 363 on Deal Island

- Coordinates: 38°9′16″N 75°56′44″W
- Country: United States
- State: Maryland
- County: Somerset

Area
  - Total: 5.37 sq mi (13.91 km^{2})
  - Land: 3.03 sq mi (7.85 km^{2})
  - Water: 2.34 sq mi (6.05 km^{2})
- Elevation: 3 ft (0.91 m)

Population (2020)
  - Total: 375
  - Density: 123.7/sq mi (47.77/km^{2})
- Time zone: UTC−5 (Eastern (EST))
  - Summer (DST): UTC−4 (EDT)
- ZIP codes: 21821, 21870
- Area code: 410
- FIPS code: 24-22100
- GNIS feature ID: 0590074

Deal Island is a census-designated place (CDP) in Somerset County, Maryland, United States. The population was 375 at the 2020 census. It is included in the Salisbury, Maryland-Delaware Metropolitan Statistical Area. The small town was listed on the National Register of Historic Places as the Deal Island Historic District in 2006.

== Geography ==
Deal Island is located at 38°9′16″N 75°56′44″W (38.154551, −75.945659).

According to the United States Census Bureau, the CDP has a total area of 5.4 square miles (14 km^{2}), of which 3.2 square miles (8.3 km^{2}) is land and 2.1 square miles (5.4 km^{2}) (39.66%) is water.

Deal Island is approximately 6 miles (9.7 km) to the west-southwest of Deal Island Wildlife Management Area.

== Demographics ==
Historical population
Census	Pop.	Note	%±
2020	375		—
U.S. Decennial Census

As of the census of 2020, there were 375 people, 240 households, and 165 families residing in the CDP. The population density was 178.0 inhabitants per square mile (68.7/km^{2}). There were 352 housing units at an average density of 108.4 units per square mile (41.9 units/km^{2}). The racial makeup of the CDP was 90.31% White, 7.96% African American, 0.87% Native American, 0.17% from other races, and 0.69% from two or more races. Hispanic or Latino of any race were 1.21% of the population.

There were 240 households, out of which 20.0% had children under the age of 18 living with them, 57.1% were married couples living together, 7.9% had a female householder with no husband present, and 31.3% were non-families. 25.8% of all households were made up of individuals, and 13.3% had someone living alone who was 65 years of age or older. The average household size was 2.41 and the average family size was 2.94.

In the CDP, the population was spread out, with 21.3% under the age of 18, 5.7% from 18 to 24, 20.6% from 25 to 44, 33.6% from 45 to 64, and 18.9% who were 65 years of age or older. The median age was 65.1 years. For every 100 females, there were 100.0 males. For every 100 females age 18 and over, there were 97.8 males.

The median income for a household in the CDP was $36,029, and the median income for a family was $38,571. Males had a median income of $30,592 versus $24,219 for females. The per capita income for the CDP was $13,936. About 4.1% of families and 5.98% of the population were below the poverty line, including 7.7% of those under age 18 and 9.3% of those age 65 or over.

== History ==
Deal Island was historically known as Deal's, Deil's, and Devil's Island. Nearby Dames Quarters also had an unappealing name: Quarters of the Damned. At least one source also attributes these nicknames to the area's use by pirates.

The island is famous for Joshua Thomas, who predicted the British defeat in the War of 1812. Thomas is buried alongside the Joshua Thomas Chapel.

The Deal Island Historic District, Sea Gull (skipjack), and St. John's Methodist Episcopal Church and Joshua Thomas Chapel are listed on the National Register of Historic Places.

== Events ==
Since 1959, Deal Island has hosted an annual Labor Day weekend Skipjack Race. The race features skipjacks, which are traditional wooden sailing vessels with triangular sails, designed for dredging oysters. They are two-sail bateaux, and the term 'bateau' is still preferred by watermen. These vessels were operated extensively between the 1880s to the 1960s. Deal Island was once the home port for a large fleet of skipjacks and today has most of the few remaining skipjacks operating commercially for oystering on the Chesapeake Bay.

Also, during the Labor Day weekend, there is the annual Deal Island yard sale. It begins on Saturday and continues into Monday. Participants from other communities near Deal Island are also included.

== Transportation ==
Deal Island's main road is Maryland Route 363; its entire length known as Deal Island Road. Route 363 traverses the entire island and travels due east to U.S. Route 13 in Princess Anne.

Deal Island's communities were once served by the Somerset Commuter (now Shore Transit), on Route 4, starting from Princess Anne's main transfer point. This route was removed in 2005.

== Notable person ==
- William Daniel (1826–1897), Maryland politician, was born in Deal Island.
- Emma Berdis Jones (1900–1999), mother of American author James Baldwin (1924–1987), was born on Deal Island and traveled to Philadelphia and then New York as part of the Great Migration. James Baldwin was born James Arthur Jones in New York City. Both are memorialized at Ferncliff Cemetery and Mausoleum, Hartsdale, Westchester County, New York, USA.
