= Sea Gull (skipjack) =

- SEA GULL
- U.S. National Register of Historic Places
- Location within Maryland Location within the United States
- Location: Lower thorofare, Deal Island, Maryland
- Coordinates: 38°7′41″N 75°56′54″W
- Area: less than one acre
- Built: 1924
- Architectural style: Skipjack
- MPS: Chesapeake Bay Skipjack Fleet TR
- NRHP reference No.: 85001078
- Added to NRHP: May 16, 1985

The Sea Gull is a Chesapeake Bay skipjack fishing boat, built in 1924 at Crisfield, Maryland. She is a 46.6-foot-long (14.2 m) two-sail bateau, or "V"-bottomed deadrise type of centerboard sloop. She has a beam of 15.9 feet (4.8 m), a depth of 4.3 feet (1.3 m), and a net register tonnage of 10. She is one of the 35 surviving traditional Chesapeake Bay skipjacks and a member of the last commercial sailing fleet in the United States. She is located at Deal Island, Somerset County, Maryland.

She was listed on the National Register of Historic Places in 1985.
