= Princess Anne Historic District =

Historic district in Maryland, United States

- U.S. National Register of Historic Places
- U.S. Historic district
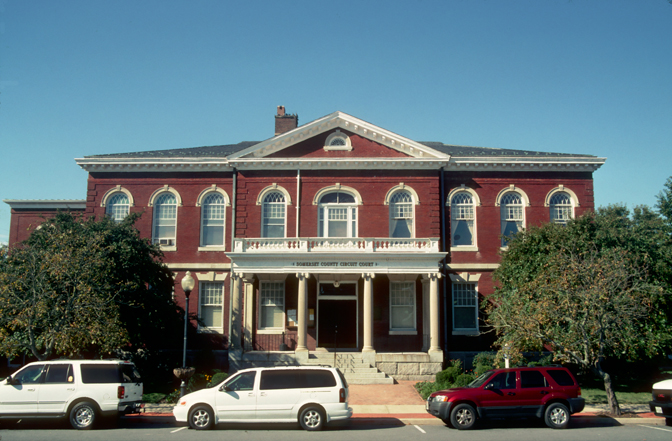
- Somerset County Courthouse, located in the district

- Location within Maryland Location within the United States
- Location: Off MD 413, Princess Anne, Maryland
- Coordinates: 38°12′14″N 75°41′38″W
- Area: 150 acres (61 ha)
- Built by: Lind, E.G.; Et al.
- Architectural style: Italianate, Queen Anne, Federal
- NRHP reference No.: 80001834
- Added to NRHP: October 14, 1980

The Princess Anne Historic District is located in Princess Anne the county seat of Somerset County, Maryland on Maryland's Eastern Shore. There has been little change due to industry or other development, and the town retains much of its historic character since its founding in the early 18th century. It has been the governmental center since the county was formed in 1742 and the present courthouse is one of the most architecturally distinguished in the state. Within the historic district are a few pre-Revolutionary structures, a high concentration of Federal and Victorian architecture, vernacular dwellings as well as 19th and early-20th century commercial and public buildings. The district contains approximately 270 structures of which nearly 90 percent are contributing to the character of the district.

Among the contributing structures are:

- Beckford Avenue Tenant Houses (c.1870)
- Boxwood Gardens (c.1850)
- Charles Jones House (c.1780)
- Colonel George Handy House (1805–06)
- John W. Crisfield House ("Somerset House") (c.1852 and earlier)
- Linden Hill (c.1750, c.1835)
- Littleton Long House (c.1830) (See Somerset County Historical Trust)
- Nutter's Purchase (c.1744)
- St. Andrews Episcopal Church (1767–73, 1859, 1896)
- Teackle Gatehouse (c.1805)
- Washington Hotel (c.1797, 1838)
- William Geddes House ("Tunstall Cottage") (c.1755)
- William W. Johnston House (c.1834-35)
- Woolford-Elzey House (c.1788, c.1840)

It was listed on the National Register of Historic Places in 1980.
