= St. John's Methodist Episcopal Church and Joshua Thomas Chapel =

Historic church in Maryland, United States

- U.S. National Register of Historic Places
- Location within Maryland Location within the United States
- Location: 9883 Deal Island Road (MD 363), Deal Island, Maryland
- Coordinates: 38°9′19″N 75°56′50″W
- Area: 2.5 acres (1.0 ha)
- Built: 1850
- Architectural style: Gothic, Greek Revival
- NRHP reference No.: 90001550
- Added to NRHP: November 1, 1990

St. John's Methodist Episcopal Church and Joshua Thomas Chapel is a historic Methodist Episcopal church complex located at Deal Island, Somerset County, Maryland. The complex consists of St. John's Methodist Episcopal Church, an 1879 frame Gothic building; Joshua Thomas Chapel, an 1850 Greek Revival frame structure; and the surrounding cemetery with 19th and 20th century burials and markers. The church features a three-story bell tower. The chapel is the oldest site in Somerset County in continuous use for Methodist meetings, which began in tents in 1828.

It was listed on the National Register of Historic Places in 1990.
