= Teichfuss Gabbiano =

Gabbiano

General information
- Type: High performance glider
- National origin: Italy
- Manufacturer: Luigi Teichfuss
- Designer: Luigi Teichfuss
- Number built: 1

History
- First flight: 1928

The Teichfuss Gabbiano (English: Seagull) was an Italian, one-off, single seat, high performance glider, designed by Luigi Teichfuss and flown in 1928.

== Design and development ==
Luigi Teichfuss took part in the First International Gliding Competition, held on Monte Sisemol near Asiago in October 1924, with a glider of his own design, the poorly documented Condor. At the Competition he saw the Akaflieg Darmstadt D-9 Konsul and used it in 1927 as the starting point of his Gabbiano design, though the finished aircraft was distinctly different.

The Gabbiano was a high wing cantilever monoplane built from wood and covered with a mixture of plywood and fabric. Its wing had a single spar, torsion box structure and was constructed in three sections. The central part, about 40% of the span, was rectangular in plan and was without dihedral. The outer panels were straight tapered to blunt tips, the wing becoming thinner and thus acquiring dihedral though retaining a horizontal upper surface. Ailerons occupied the whole trailing edges of these outer panels; there were no inboard flaps or air brakes. At 16:1 its aspect ratio was similar to that of the Konsul.

Its fuselage was oval in cross section, wood framed, plywood covered and tapered strongly to the tail. The wing was mounted on a pedestal faired into the aft fuselage with the pilot's open cockpit immediately ahead it, below the wing leading edge. The fin and fuselage mounted tailplane, both ply covered, had swept, straight leading edges which were rounded at their tips to merge into a curved rudder and semi-elliptical elevators. These control surfaces were fabric covered, the rudder ending above the elevators. There was a landing skid running from near the nose to under the wing trailing edge, assisted by a small tail bumper.

The Gabbiano made its first flights in 1928, piloted by Umberto Nannini. Some launches were made by aerotow, behind an Aviatik from Taliedo. Only one Gabbiano was built.

== Specifications ==
Data from Pedrielli (2011) pp.30-1

General characteristics

- Capacity: One
- Length: 6.80 m (22 ft 4 in)
- Wingspan: 16.40 m (53 ft 10 in)
- Height: 1.8 m (5 ft 11 in)
- Wing area: 16.90 m^{2} (181.9 sq ft)
- Aspect ratio: 16
- Empty weight: 190 kg (419 lb)
- Gross weight: 275 kg (606 lb)

Performance

- Maximum speed: 120 km/h (75 mph, 65 kn)
- Maximum glide ratio: estimated 22:1
- Rate of sink: 0.7 m/s (140 ft/min) minimum
- Wing loading: 16.2 kg/m^{2} (3.3 lb/sq ft)

== See also ==
Related lists

- List of gliders
