= Deal Island Historic District =

Historic district in Maryland, United States

- U.S. National Register of Historic Places
- U.S. Historic district
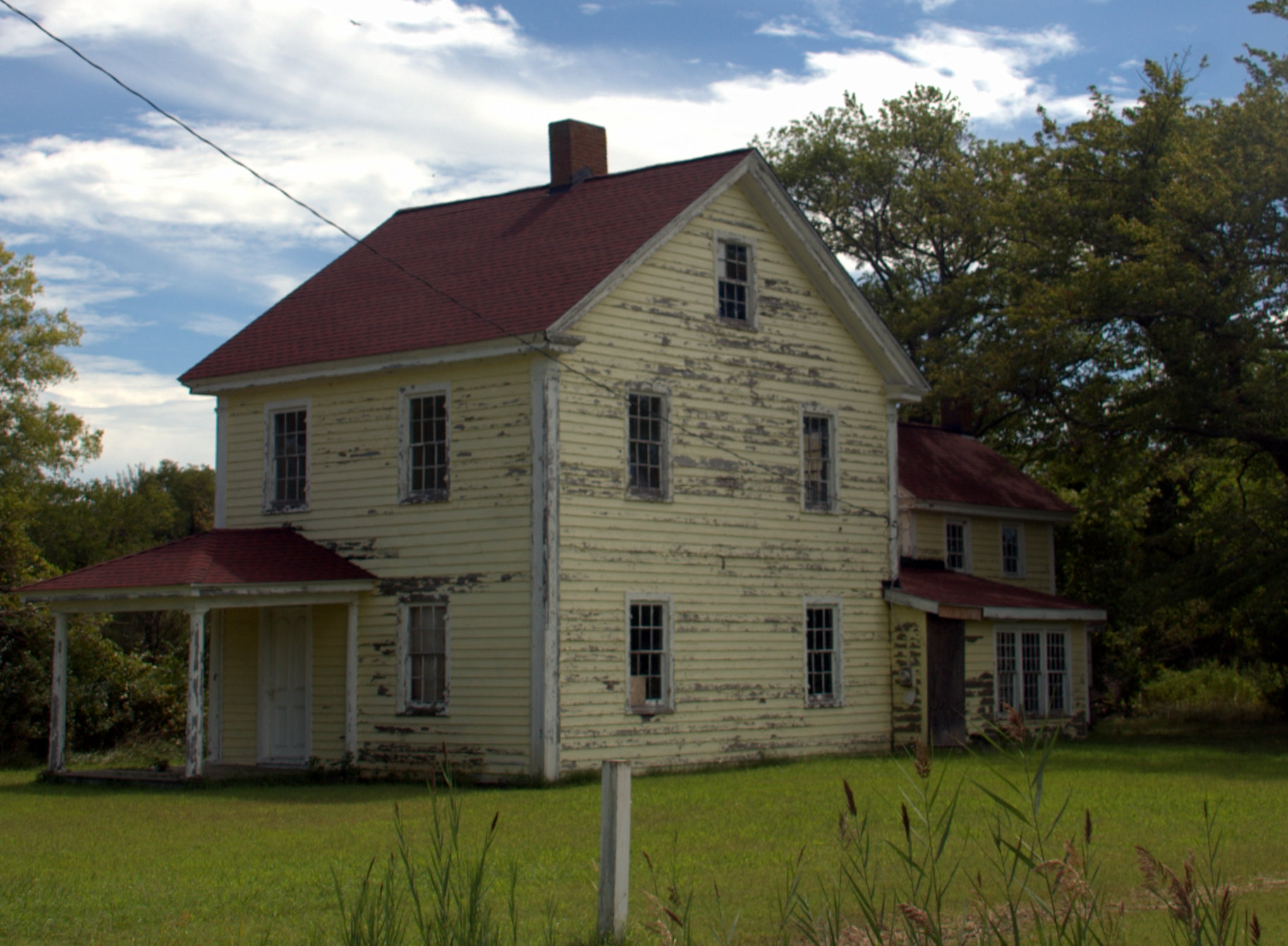

- Location within Maryland Location within the United States
- Location: Deal Is. Rd. from Upper Thorofare to Ballard Rd. and intersecting Sts., Deal Island, Maryland
- Coordinates: 38°9′38″N 75°56′49″W
- Area: 433 acres (175 ha)
- Architectural style: Federal, Greek Revival
- NRHP reference No.: 06000780
- Added to NRHP: September 6, 2006

Deal Island Historic District is a national historic district at Deal Island, Somerset County, Maryland, United States. The district encompasses the village of Deal Island. It includes Deal Island Harbor, still an active marina for fishing boats and an occasional skipjack. The 433-acre (1.75 km^{2}) district contains 81 buildings and three cemeteries that contribute to its significance.

It was added to the National Register of Historic Places in 2006.
