= All Saints Church at Monie =

Historic church in Maryland, United States

- U.S. National Register of Historic Places
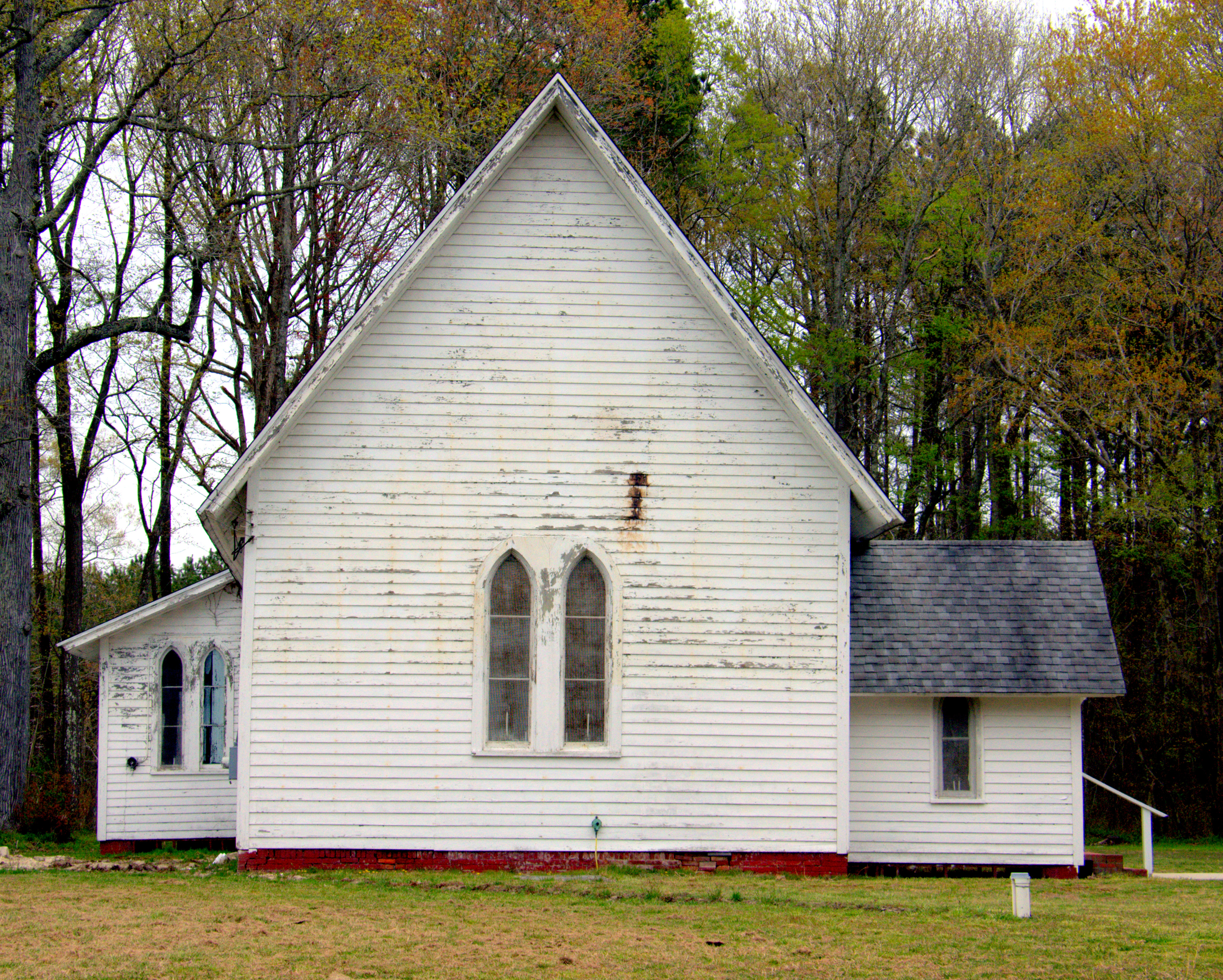

- Location within Maryland Location within the United States
- Location: Venton Road; Venton, Maryland
- Coordinates: 38°11′37″N 75°45′55″W
- Area: 28 acres (11 ha)
- Built: 1881
- Architectural style: Carpenter Gothic
- NRHP reference No.: 90001167
- Added to NRHP: August 3, 1990

All Saints Church at Monie is a historic Episcopal church located at Venton, Somerset County, Maryland. It is a single-story Carpenter Gothic-style building, five bays across by one room deep built in 1881. It is a well-preserved example of a small, rural Carpenter Gothic church taken from the designs of Richard Upjohn. Also on the property is the cemetery with 18th, 19th, and 20th century burial sites and markers.

It was listed on the National Register of Historic Places in 1990.
