= Charles Mower =

American yacht designer (1875–1942)

Charles Drown Mower
- Born: 5 October 1875
- Died: 18 January 1942 (aged 66)
- Occupations: Yacht Designer; Author
- Spouse: Francis Petriken Mower
- Children: Charles Petrican Mower

Charles Drown Mower (5 October 1875 – 18 January 1942) of New York was a noted yacht designer and author, and was at one time design editor of the Rudder magazine and a contributing author to Motor Boating magazine.

== Career ==
He starting studying yacht design in 1895 with Arthur Binney and later Bowdoin B. Crowninshield, moving on to a partnership with Thomas D. Bowes in Philadelphia, Pennsylvania in 1911. During the first World War he served as a lieutenant commander in the Construction Corps, Naval Reserve.

After the war Mower worked either alone or in partnership as Mower and Humphreys Ltd. He was also a chief naval architect at Henry B. Nevins, Inc., at City Island, New York, and in 1937 was associated with the office of Nelson & Reid, Inc. He was also official measurer of the Manhasset Bay Yacht Club, the Cruising Club of America and the New York Yacht Club.

== Family ==
His wife was Francis Petriken Mower, who died in August 1967. His son, Charles Petriken Mower, (Born 12/28/1920 Died 7/31/01) married Jane Stilwell Mower (Born 4/18/1924 Died 1/8/2001), who was a daughter of John Stilwell and niece of Joseph Stilwell, the noted WWII general. His grand children are Mildred Pastula 11/06/1954 to present and Charles Stilwell Mower 05/29/1950 to 1/1/1976.

== Surviving Work ==
Most of his surviving designs are held in the Mystic Seaport Library, where a total of 433 sheets represent 107 designs. A lot of his work was destroyed in the 1992 Noreaster and 1954 Hurricane Carol storms that attacked Connecticut. All of the surviving boat models once owned by Charles P. Mower (Mower's son) are with Mildred Mower Pastula, grand daughter of Mower, and her sons; David, Stephen and James Osler. At times models have been loaned to Yacht clubs in Greenwich CT.

== Designs ==
Some Mower yachts designs that have been well publicized include The A-Cat, The R-Class, The Legendary and the Fishers Island Design.

=== The A-Cat ===
In 1922 Judge Charles McKeehan of Philadelphia hired Mower to design a new boat specifically to win the Toms River cup. Mower's design became the Mary Ann, a 28-foot (8.5 m) hull based on the traditional East Coast catboat lines. In place of the gaff-rigged catboat sail, the first A-cat was soon equipped with a powerful Marconi rig, a tall triangular sail on a 46-foot (14 m) tall mast and sweeping 28-foot (8.5 m) boom at its foot. After Mary Ann swept the race in July 1922, other racers started having their own versions built. The seven-boat fleet became a familiar sight during the 1920s, but the Great Depression put a damper on the race scene and no more A-cats were built. Mary Ann can still be found on Barnegat Bay.

Bat (1923), Spy (1924) and Lotus (1925) were rebuilt during the late 1980s and early 1990s and are still racing on the bay today. Tamock was a Sweisguth design, but built new to the Mower plans in 1991 as the original boat was to far degraded to save. Vapor was launched new, built to the Mower plans in 1994.(Wooden Boat, 2003, issue 171)

Year	1922
Overall length	28 feet (8.5 m)
Waterline length	22 feet (6.7 m)
Beam	11 feet (3.4 m)
Draft	2 feet 6 inches (0.76 m)
Mast above Deck	46 feet (14 m)
Boom	28 feet (8.5 m)
Sail area	615 square feet (57.1 m^{2})
Construction	Cedar on oak
Fastenings	Bronze cooper
First Builder	Morton Johnson, Bay Head

=== Fishers Island One Designs ===
Since they were built in 1923, the Fishers Island One Designs, as the Class A's were originally called, have been enthusiastically raced, day sailed and cruised on Fishers Island Sound. The fleet has anchored in only two harbors. Hay Harbor, Fishers Island, New York, from 1923–33 and then the Lagoon at Groton Long Point, Conn., from 1933 to the present. The original model of this boats is owned by Mildred Pastula (grand daughter of Mower) and is nearly identical to the Sidney or Charles Herreshoff models. The two designers were acquainted and both worked on the Fishers Island boats, so the similarity is not a surprise, but who should get the credit remains an area of contention.

The Mower model is in poor shape after years on neglect and flood damaged from the 1992 storm, much like many of the other half models that were stored in Charles P. Mower's basement.

Year	~1910
Overall length	~23 feet
First Builder	City Island, New York or Dauntless Yard in Essex, Conn

=== R-Class ===
R-Class racing sloops were built to the Universal Rule developed by Nathanael Herreshoff. They were widely raced in New England, on the Great Lakes, and in California. A few well noted R boats are still in existence. There are six such yachts at the Cleveland Yachting Club that continue to race against one another every summer. CYC yacht Ardette is a fully restored and updated 1925 Mower.

==== Ace ====
Ace is a 43-foot (13 m) R-Class Sloop built in 1926, and was four-time winner of the San Francisco Pepetual Challenge Cup in her early years. More recently won the A Class Sloop "West Coast Boat of the Year Award" in 1998, and also won the A Class First Place in the Josh Slocum's Lyle Galloway Memorial Summer Series. She has had X owners, being first sold in 1944 to Jack DeMandel of Belvedere, California. In 1987 Jack Langton of Long Beach purchased her, selling her on in 1990 to Jim Squire who raced and extensively restored her. The deck was replaced and covered with epoxy resin and fiberglass. 68 deck beams were replaced and a new mast along with a diesel engine added. Garth Blair then purchased Ace in January 1998 and she is currently harbored in Wooden Hull Yacht Club. Newport Beach CA.

Year	1926
Overall length	43 feet (13 m)
Waterline length	29 feet (8.8 m)
Beam	7 and a half feet
Draft	7 feet (2.1 m)
Mast above Deck	
Builder	Madden & Lewis, Sausalito

==== Penobscot ====
Penobscot is a 37-foot (11m)R-class sloop, designed by Charles Mower and custom built in 1923 by Hodgdon Brothers of Boothbay, Maine. Her construction is carvel mahogany planking, bronze-screw fastened to oak frames with oak backbone, oak deadwood and oak floor timbers with teak decks, mahogany trim, Sitka spruce spars, and bronze hardware. Her rig is a fractional Marconi sloop. She was originally built for New York Yacht Club member Frederic Hitz of Deer Isle, sold to William Whipple of Camden, Maine in 1944, to Robert Hills of Owls Head in 1948, to Anne and Maynard Bray then of Noank, Connecticut, in 1958, to Vernon Baker of Tenants Harbor, Maine, and Scotch Plains, New Jersey, in 1967, again to Anne and Maynard Bray, then of Brooklin, Maine, in 1984, to Robert Burke then of Islesboro, Maine, (later of Middletown, RI) in 1986 and to Hortensia Sampedro, of Key Biscayne, Fl, in 2000. She is listed in "The Register of Wooden Boats". She underwent a restoration in the late 80s that included the addition of a diesel engine. After two years "on the hard" she was re-launched and new rigging was installed in 2001 together with new sails. In 2009 her deck and cockpit was re-fastened and re-caulked, and in 2010 her hull was re-caulked and a new engine installed. Penobscot was campaigned on Biscayne Bay, under the Biscayne Bay Yacht Racing Association; some honors include 2001, Hughes Cup, second place, 2001 Goombay Pursuit, first place, 2001 WYRA Coral Cup, Gold Fleet, third place, 2001 BBYRA Fall Series, third place, 2001 Annual, PHRF 4, fifth place; most recently winning second in class at the 2010 44th Annual Ed Willman 'Round the Island Race. While in Florida, Penobscot was harbored at Key Biscayne Yacht Club, Miami, Florida. Penobscot was recently purchased by Lindsay G. Merrithew a member of the Royal Canadian Yacht Club, Toronto, Canada (RCYC) and is currently undergoing a restoration at D. N. Hylan and Associates in Brooklin, Maine. She was scheduled to be relaunched on her 90th Birthday.

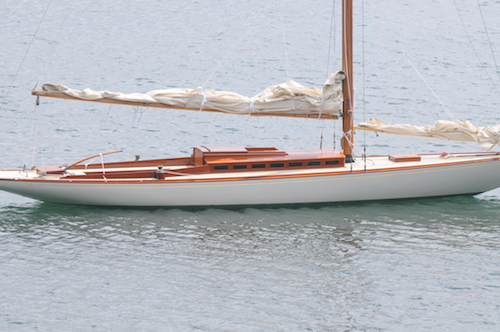
Penobscot off the coast, near East Boothbay, Maine, 2013.

Year	1923
Deck length	37 feet (11 m)
Waterline length	25 and a half feet
Beam	8 feet (2.4 m)
Draft	6 feet (1.8 m)
Displacement	11,000
Boom	
Sail area	381 Sq. ft. main, 253 sq. ft. 140% genoa
Construction	Wood
Fastenings	Bronze
Builder	Hodgdon Brothers of Boothbay, Maine

=== Cutter Sailboat ===
==== Tops-O-Cotton ====
Tops-O-Cotton won a number of races in her early years in Milwaukee, before being sold to a Chicago sailor and then to Bob Jacobsen and his father. Jacobsen sailed Tops-O-Cotton for over 30 years, making her a familiar sight in the Montrose Harbor, and Chicago sailing circles generally. In 1998 she was purchased by Carl Hammer, who converted her to glass covered cypress planking. She is still harbored in Montrose Harbor, Chicago, Illinois. In 2008 she was donated to the Wisconsin Maritime Museum in Manitowoc, WI

Year	1934
Overall length	34 feet (10 m)
Waterline length	26 feet (7.9 m)
Beam	8 feet 2 inches (2.49 m)
Draft	5 feet 2 inches (1.57 m)
Ballast	3,300 lb (1,500 kg).
Displacement	5,600 lb (2,500 kg).
Construction	one inch cypress carvel planking on oak frames with oak bow sprit and bumpkin.
Builder	Ferdinand Nimphius

=== Other Notable Boats ===
Boat	Type	Size
Buster	sailing dinghy	12-foot (3.7 m)
Caper	auxiliary Cape Cod cat	22-foot (6.7 m)
Columbia Jr.	hydroplane	151-cu. in.
Comfy	RD cruiser, RB	32-foot (9.8 m)
Content	DC cruiser	32-foot (9.8 m)
Dolores	auxiliary cruising knockabout	24-foot (7.3 m)
Frances	auxiliary cruising knockabout	18-foot (5.5 m)
Grace	gaff-rigged Cape Cod cat	21-foot (6.4 m)
Marquita	DC runabout	30-foot (9.1 m) VB
Pacer	DC runabout	26-foot (7.9 m) VB
Pronto	schooner-rigged motor sailer	40-foot (12 m) and 48-foot (15 m) version
Shorebird	shoal-draft gaff-rigged CB sloop	21 feet (6.4 m)
Shorty	RD cruiser	20-foot (6.1 m)
Slicque	economical VB runabout	21-foot (6.4 m)
Smarty	FB for sail or OB	14-footer
Snapper	RB sailing dinghy	12-foot (3.7 m)
Transco	clinker-built OB runabout	18-foot (5.5 m)
Uwhilna	Teak Yawl	51-foot (16 m)
Whiz	baby hydroplane	13½-foot
Whiz	OB runabout	16-foot (4.9 m)
Duckling	Sloop	38-foot (12 m)

Vanity // round-bottom twenty foot knockabout//first round-bottom Chesapeake 20

=== Books ===
The Plan Book of Cruisers, Runabouts, Auxiliaries and Outboard Motor Boats (Smartest and Most Up-To-Date Collection of Small Boat Designs, Volume IX) (Hardcover) Hardcover: 48 pages Publisher: Motor Boating (1927)

How to build a knockabout, (Rudder how-to series) (Unknown Binding) Unknown Binding: 58 pages Publisher: The Rudder Pub. Co (1902)

How to build a cruiser (Sea bird) (Unknown Binding) Publisher: The Rudder publishing company (1912)

How to build a racing sloop, (Unknown Binding) Publisher: Rudder Pub. Co (1920)

How to build a motor launch, (Rudder how-to series) (Unknown Binding) Unknown Binding: 42 pages Publisher: Rudder Pub. Co (1901)

Thirty Easy To Build Sail Boats With Auxiliary Power, IDEAL SERIES, VOLUME 15 (co authored) Hardcover Publisher: Motor Boating (1945)

Sailing Craft, Edwin J. Schoettle (editor), The Macmillan Co. New York (1928)
