= Oriole, Maryland =

Unincorporated community in Maryland, United States

- Unincorporated community
- Location within Maryland
- Coordinates: 38°10′23″N 75°48′28″W
- Country: United States
- State: Maryland
- County: Somerset
- Elevation: 3 ft (0.91 m)
- Time zone: UTC-5 (Eastern (EST))
  - Summer (DST): UTC-4 (EDT)
- ZIP code: 21853
- Area codes: 410, 443, and 667
- GNIS feature ID: 590953

Oriole is an unincorporated community in Somerset County, Maryland, United States. Oriole is located at the intersection of Maryland Route 627 and Jerusalem Road, west of Princess Anne. The William S. Smith House was listed on the National Register of Historic Places in 1991.

== Notable person ==
- Joe Muir, baseball player
