= USS Seagull (AM-30) =

Minesweeper of the United States Navy

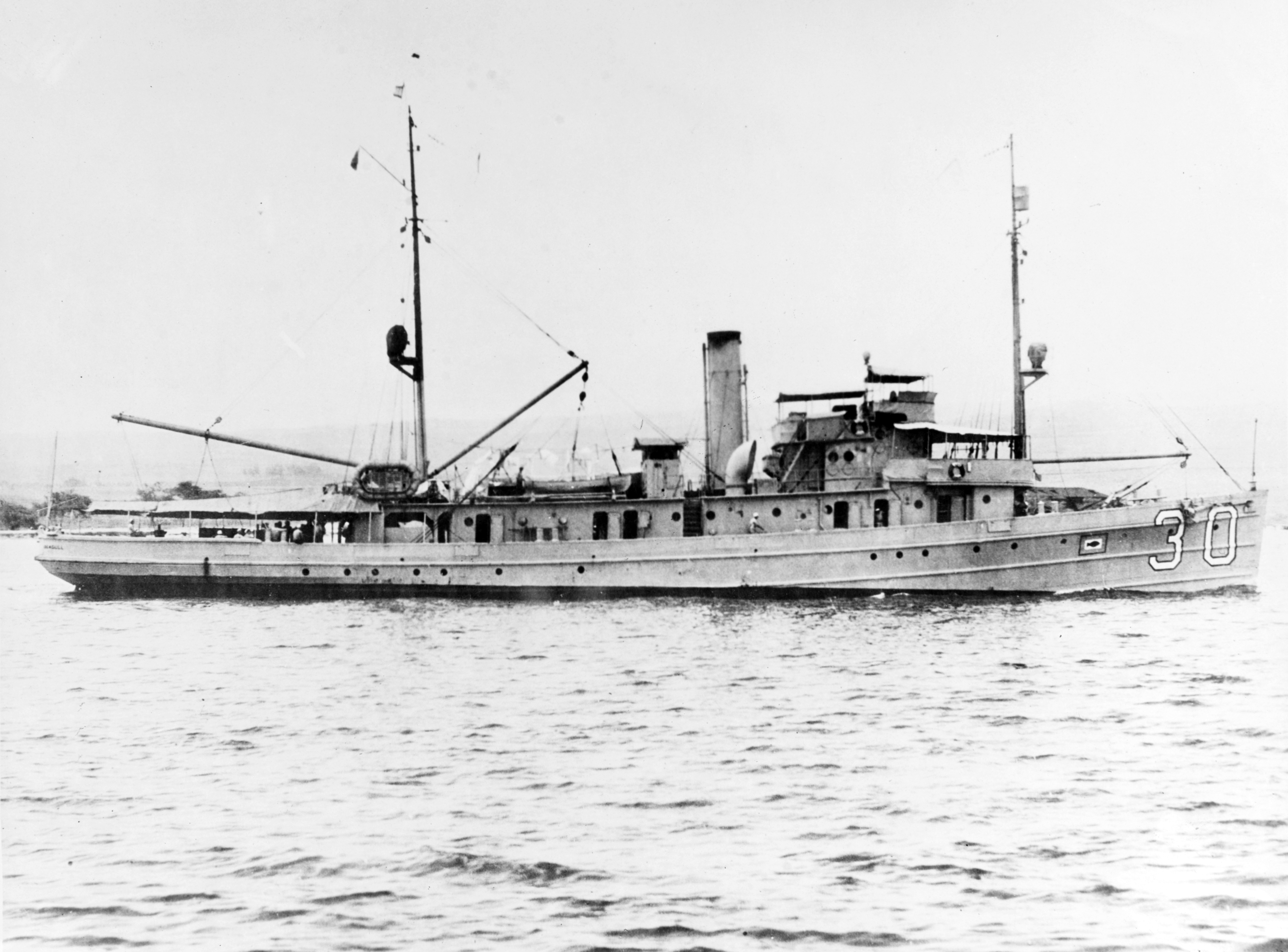

History

United States
- Name: USS Seagull
- Builder: Gas Engine and Power Co., Morris Heights, New York
- Laid down: 15 June 1918
- Launched: 24 December 1918
- Commissioned: 7 March 1919, as Minesweeper No.30
- Decommissioned: 5 September 1946
- Reclassified: AM-30, 17 July 1920; AT-141, 1 June 1942; ATO-141, 15 May 1944
- Stricken: 15 October 1946
- Fate: Transferred to the United States Maritime Commission for disposal, 2 May 1947

General characteristics
- Class & type: Lapwing-class minesweeper
- Displacement: 840 long tons (853 t)
- Length: 187 ft 10 in (57.25 m)
- Beam: 35 ft 6 in (10.82 m)
- Draft: 10 ft 4 in (3.15 m)
- Speed: 14 knots (26 km/h; 16 mph)
- Complement: 72
- Armament: 2 × 3 in (76 mm) guns

USS Seagull (AM-30) was a Lapwing-class minesweeper built for the United States Navy near the end of World War I. Commissioned in March 1919, she sailed to Europe to help clear the North Sea Mine Barrage, where she was damaged by a mine explosion in September 1919. She was transferred to the Pacific and, from 1922, served as a submarine tender at Pearl Harbor, performing torpedo recovery, target towing, and escort duties for the duration of World War II. Reclassified as an ocean tug during the war, she was decommissioned in September 1946 and transferred for disposal in 1947.

== Construction and commissioning ==
Seagull was laid down on 15 June 1918 by the Gas Engine and Power Co., Morris Heights, New York; launched on 24 December 1918; sponsored by Mrs. C.G. Amory; and commissioned on 7 March 1919 as Minesweeper No. 30.

== World War I mine barrage clearance ==
Following shakedown, Seagull proceeded to Boston, Massachusetts, whence she sailed for Scotland and duty with the North Sea Mine Detachment. Departing on 28 June, she arrived at Kirkwall on 10 July to join other units already engaged in clearing the waters between Scotland and Norway of the mine barrage planted during World War I. On 30 September, during the seventh and final sweeping operation, Seagull was damaged by the explosion of an upper-level mine. On the completion of repairs, she departed England with others of the force; and, after stops at Brest and the Azores, set out to recross the Atlantic. En route, storms slowed her progress, and the small amount of fuel she had received at Brest ran out. The extra fuel carried by Black Hawk (AD-9) eased the situation and enabled the force to arrive back in the United States in early November. On the 19th, the ships gathered at Tompkinsville, New York, where, on the 25th, the North Sea Mine Force was dissolved.

== Post-World War I Pacific operations ==
Seagull, assigned to the Pacific Fleet, proceeded first to Charleston, South Carolina, for repairs; then – with the new year, 1920 – continued on to San Diego, California, arriving on 30 January. Designated AM-30 seven months later, she operated as a unit of the 3rd Division, 4th Mine Squadron until June 1922 when she was ordered to serve as a submarine tender at Pearl Harbor. There, with only occasional interruptions for inter-island towing and passenger runs, fleet problems, and overhauls during the 1920s and 1930s and to assist in salvage operations at Pearl Harbor after 7 December 1941, she provided services – torpedo recovery, target towing, and escort – until after the close of World War II.

== Decommissioning ==
Redesignated twice during the war, to Ocean Tug AT-141 on 1 June 1942 and to ATO-141 on 15 May 1944, Seagull departed Pearl Harbor for the last time in October 1945 and arrived at Mare Island, California, on the 12th to await inactivation. Assigned to SubRon 3 during the interim, she was decommissioned on 5 September 1946; struck from the Navy list on 15 October 1946; and transferred to the United States Maritime Commission for disposal on 2 May 1947.
