= George Crouch =

American boat designer (1879–1959)

George F. Crouch
- Born: 1879
- Died: 1959 (aged 79–80)

George F. Crouch (1879–1959) was an American boat designer. He worked for the Dodge Boat Works in Newport News. Three speedboats built to his designs won the first three places in the 1924 Gold Cup of the American Power Boat Association. In 1939 his design for a torpedo boat was one of two approved by the US Navy for prototype construction; both designs were found in trials to be obsolescent, and a British design by Hubert Scott-Paine was chosen instead.

== Designs ==
- Peter Pan, 1911
- Typhoon, 1920
- Rainbow I, 1920
- Rainbow IV, 1924
- Baby Bootlegger, 1924
- Miss Columbia, 1924
- Teaser, 1924
- Impshi, 1924
- Arcadian, 1926
- Janice III, 1927
- Gypsy Queen, 1936
- PT1, PT2, PT3, PT4, 1938
- Cinderella
