= Deal Island Wildlife Management Area =

State Wildlife Management Area in Somerset County, Maryland

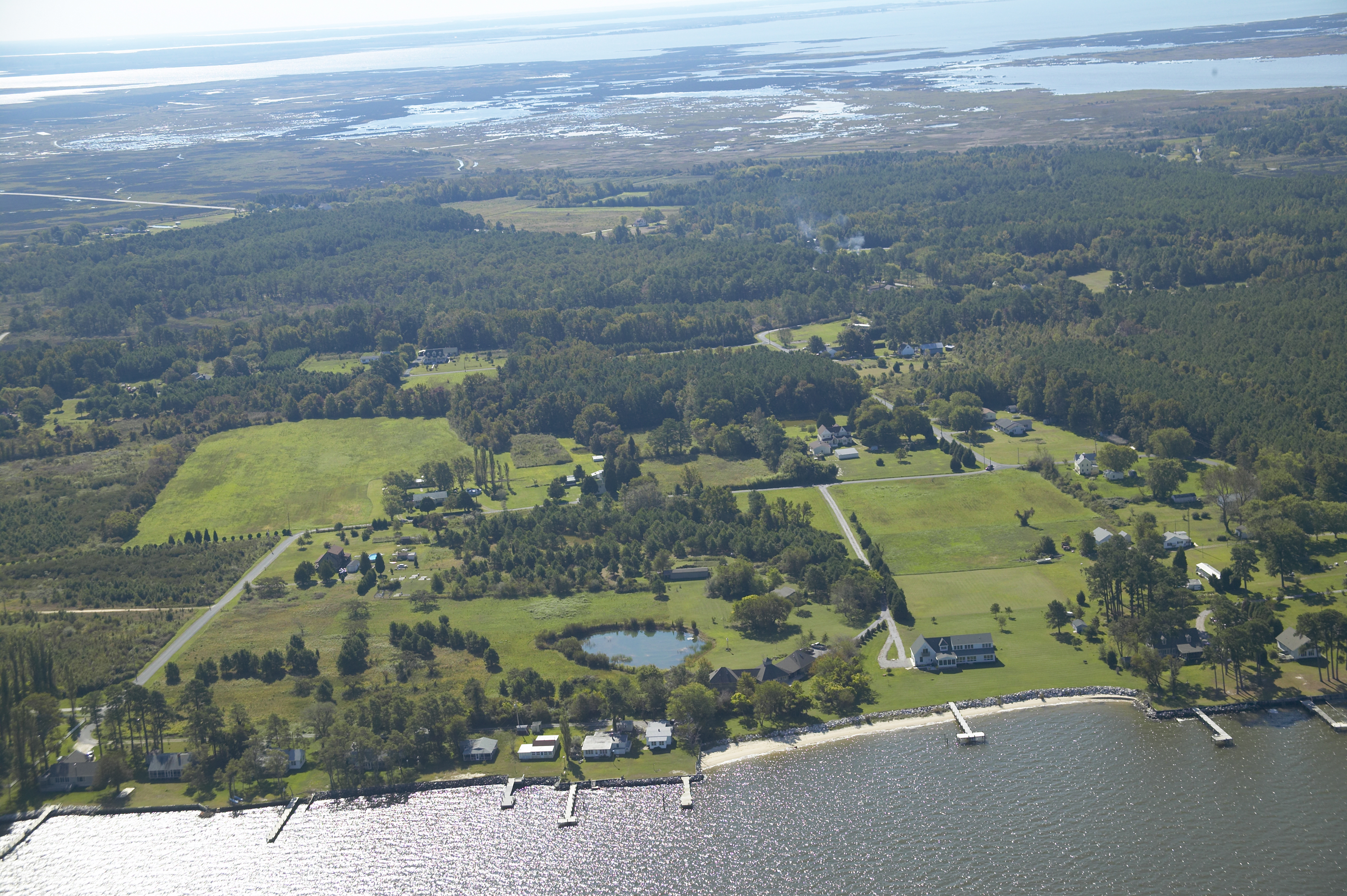
- Aerial view of Deal Island WMA behind a residential area

- Location within Maryland Location within the United States
- Location: Somerset, Maryland, United States
- Coordinates: 38°11′11″N 75°51′55″W
- Area: 13,565 acres (54.90 km^{2})
- Operator: Maryland Department of Natural Resources
- Website: Deal Island WMA

Deal Island Wildlife Management Area protects 13,565 acres (54.90 km^{2}) in western Somerset County, Maryland near the community of Deal Island. As a wildlife management area, the area is managed by the Maryland Department of Natural Resources' Wildlife and Heritage Service to conserve wildlife populations and their habitats, while providing public recreational use of wildlife resources.

Deal Island WMA includes a 2,800-acre (11 km^{2}) man-made pond or "impoundment", and flat trails frequented by hiking and off-road cycling enthusiasts. Recreational activities include photography, fishing, small boating (canoe and kayak), birdwatching (waterfowl including uncommon duck species), hunting (geese and duck) and crabbing. According to the Maryland Ornithological Society, over 220 different species of birds have been seen within the area.
