= USS Sea Gull (SP-223) =

Patrol vessel of the United States Navy

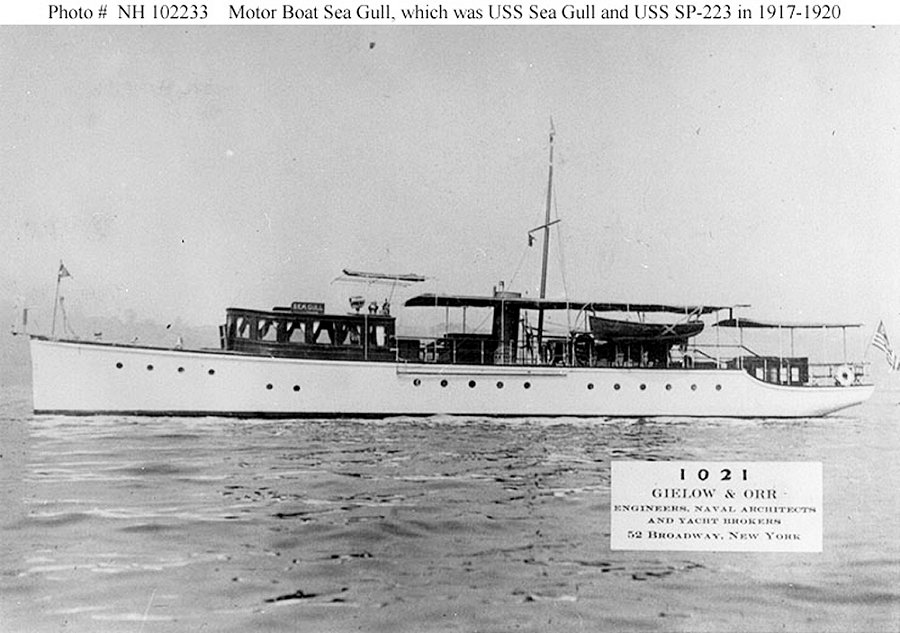

History

United States
- Name: USS Sea Gull
- Builder: New York Yacht, Launch, & Engine Co., Morris Heights, New York
- Laid down: 1910, as Tonis
- Acquired: 18 May 1917, renamed Sea Gull
- In service: 16 May 1917
- Out of service: 1918
- Fate: Scrapped, 6 April 1920

General characteristics
- Type: Wooden yacht
- Displacement: 38 long tons (39 t)
- Length: 83 ft (25 m)
- Beam: 11 ft (3.4 m)
- Draft: 4 ft 10 in (1.47 m)
- Depth of hold: 6 ft (1.8 m)
- Speed: 15 knots (28 km/h; 17 mph)
- Complement: Varied
- Armament: 1 × 1-pounder gun

The second USS Sea Gull (SP-223) was a wooden yacht in the United States Navy.

Sea Gull was built during 1910 as Tonis by New York Yacht, Launch, & Engine Co., Morris Heights, New York, was enrolled in the Naval Coast Defense Reserve on 28 April 1917 following the entry of the United States into World War I. Placed in service on 16 May 1917, she was officially acquired by the US Navy on 18 May 1917.

== World War I East Coast Assignment ==
Sea Gull patrolled the waters of the 5th Naval District during her World War I service. She was based at Hampton Roads, Virginia, until 3 July 1918 when she was transferred to Baltimore, Maryland.

== Deactivation ==
Placed out of service late in 1918, Sea Gull was struck from the Navy List; sold for scrapping to J.W. Dennis of Ocean View, Virginia, and removed from her US Navy berth on 6 April 1920.
