= USS Sea Gull (1818) =

Steamship

History

United States
- Name: Sea Gull
- Launched: November 1818
- Acquired: by purchase, December 1822
- Fate: Sold, 1840

General characteristics
- Type: Steamer
- Displacement: 150 long tons (152 t)
- Propulsion: Steam engine and sails
- Armament: 5 × guns

Sea Gull was a steamship in the United States Navy. She was the second steamship of the United States Navy and the first to serve actively as a warship.

Sea Gull was built as the river steamer Enterprise by the Connecticut Steam Boat Company, Hartford, Connecticut. She was launched in November 1818 and made her first trial run in July 1819. She was purchased by the US Navy in December 1822 for use as a shallow water vessel operating against pirates along the coast of Cuba, and renamed Sea Gull.

After the gunboat had been outfitted with sails, Lieutenant John C. Newton commanded her during her passage to Norfolk, Virginia where, on 14 February 1823, Lieutenant William H. Watson assumed command. She then proceeded to Santo Domingo to join Commodore David Porter's West Indies Squadron. During May 1823, she served as guard vessel at Thompson's Island. On 13 September 1823, at Key West, Lt. Watson died, and Lt. Ralph Voorhees took command.

In September 1823, Porter returned to Washington in Sea Gull, arriving in 43 days. She underwent repairs at the Washington Navy Yard from 25 October to 30 December 1823.

She returned to the West Indies in February 1824 where, on 30 March, Lt. Voorhees reported the recapture of the schooner Pacification. During April and May, with Lt. Jesse Wilkinson in command, she participated in an expedition along the coast of Cuba in search of pirates.

In June, Commodore Porter returned to Washington in Sea Gull, making the trip in nine days. In July 1824, Lt. Isaac McKeever assumed command and returned to the West Indies whence Sea Gull patrolled until March 1825. At this time, with the barge Gallinipper she joined the British frigate Dartmouth and two schooners, HMS Lion and Union, in a raid on a pirate vessel. The operation resulted in the death of eight pirates and the capture of 19.

Sea Gull continued to operate with the squadron until July 1825, when she was ordered to return to the east coast. She was subsequently surveyed, found unfit for further sea duty, and fitted out as a receiving ship at Philadelphia, Pennsylvania. There she served until she was sold in 1840.

There is a painting of the USS Sea Gull at the Custom House Museum in Key West, FL by David Harrison Wright 2003.
