= USS Sea Gull (SP-544) =

Patrol vessel of the United States Navy

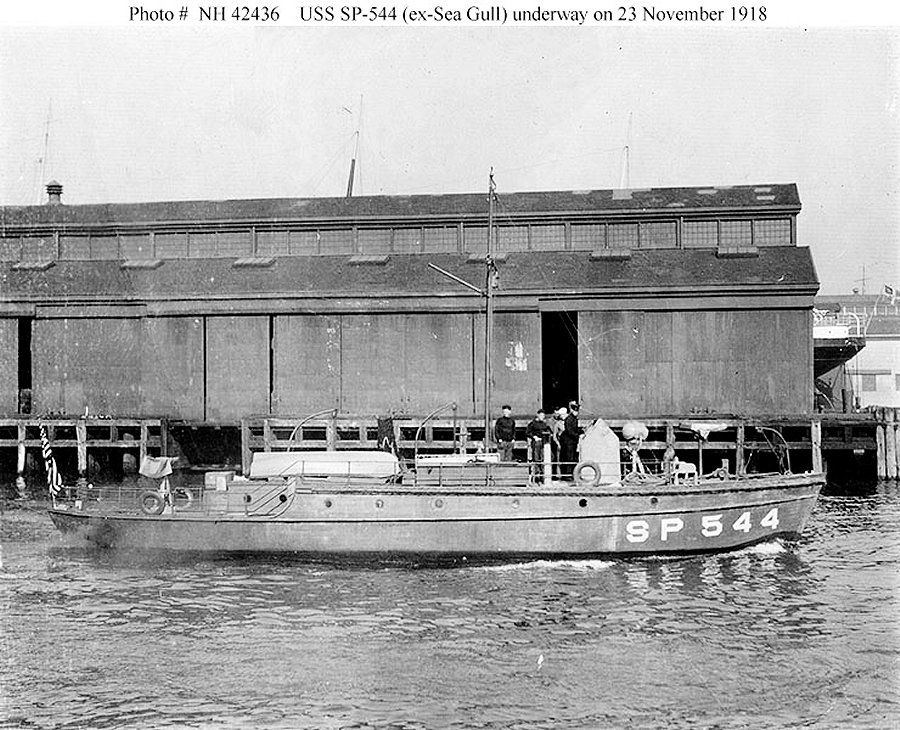

History

United States
- Name: USS Sea Gull
- Builder: Greenport Basin and Construction Company, Long Island, New York
- Launched: 1902, as Heather
- Acquired: 1 June 1917, renamed Sea Gull
- Commissioned: 1 June 1917
- Decommissioned: 27 November 1918
- Stricken: 2 June 1919
- Fate: Returned to owner

General characteristics
- Type: Wooden yacht
- Displacement: 20 long tons (20 t)
- Length: 58 ft 6 in (17.83 m)
- Beam: 13 ft (4.0 m)
- Draft: 5 ft (1.5 m)
- Speed: 9.5 knots (17.6 km/h; 10.9 mph)
- Armament: 1 × 1-pounder gun; 1 × .30 caliber machine-gun

The third USS Sea Gull (SP-544) was a wooden yacht in the United States Navy.

Sea Gull was built during 1902 as Heather by the Greenport Basin and Construction Company, Long Island, New York, was enrolled in the Naval Coast Defense Reserve on 1 June 1917 following the entry of the United States into World War I; and commissioned shortly afterward.

== World War I operations ==
Sea Gull patrolled the waters of the 4th Naval District during her World War I service. Based at Essington, Pennsylvania, she cruised off the Essington Shipbuilding Company yard and its environs until the war's end.

On 8 October 1917, a heavy storm swept across Delaware Bay, threatening to scatter the flotilla, of which Sea Gull was a part, on patrol duty there. The patrol boat USS Vidofner (SP-402) dragged anchor at 07:30 hours and fouled Sea Gull before getting underway and clearing Sea Gull. In the rough seas, both patrol boats dropped their anchors and moored off Brown Shoal Buoy in the hope of riding out the storm, which did not let up. Sea Gull, unable to get underway, drifted off into the pre-dawn darkness on 9 October 1917, dragging her anchors and sending out SOS signals. Sea Gull eventually was taken under tow by another vessel and made haven behind the breakwater at Lewes, Delaware, on 9 October 1917 by 08:15 hours. She found Vidofner, which had arrived under her own power, already there.

== Disposal ==
Decommissioned at Atlantic City, New Jersey, on 27 November 1918, Sea Gull was ordered returned to her owner on 2 June 1919 and struck from the Navy List.
