= USS Seagull (AMS-55) =

Minesweeper of the United States Navy

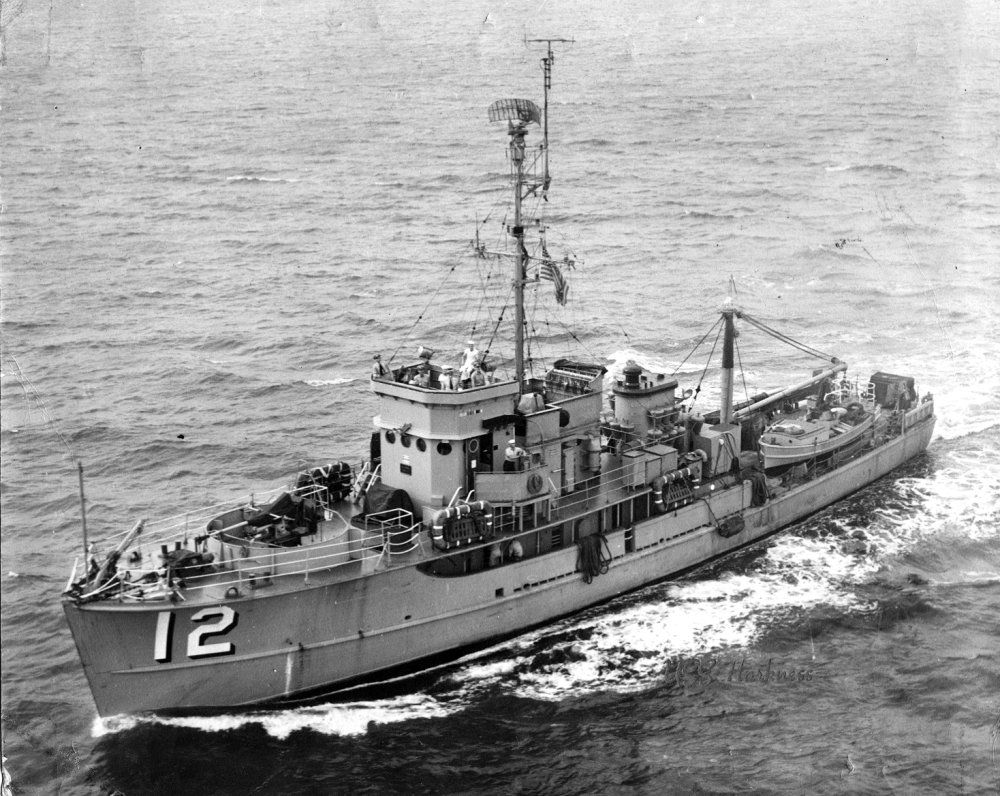
- A YMS-1-class minesweeper

History

United States
- Name: USS YMS-402
- Builder: Henry B. Nevins, Inc.; City Island, Bronx
- Laid down: 24 July 1942
- Launched: 17 April 1943
- Commissioned: 26 June 1943
- Decommissioned: 1 August 1946
- In service: 30 October 1946, as Naval Reserve training ship
- Renamed: USS Seagull (AMS-55), 1 September 1947
- Namesake: the seagull bird
- Recommissioned: 10 May 1950
- Reclassified: MSC(O)-55, 7 February 1955
- Decommissioned: 11 October 1957
- Stricken: 1 November 1959
- Honors and awards: 1 battle star, post World War II minesweeping
- Fate: Sold; Ultimate fate unknown

General characteristics
- Class & type: YMS-135 subclass of YMS-1-class minesweepers
- Displacement: 320 (f.) tons
- Length: 136 ft (41 m)
- Beam: 24 ft 6 in (7.47 m)
- Draft: 6 ft 1 in (1.85 m)
- Propulsion: 2 × 880 bhp General Motors 8-268A diesel engines; 2 shafts
- Speed: 13 knots (24 km/h)
- Complement: 33
- Armament: 1 × 3"/50 caliber gun mount; 2 × 20 mm guns; 2 × depth charge projectors

USS Seagull (MCS(O)-55/AMS-55/YMS-402) was a YMS-1-class minesweeper of the YMS-135 subclass built for the United States Navy during World War II.

== History ==
Seagull was laid down as YMS-402 on 24 July 1942 by Henry B. Nevins, Inc., City Island, Bronx; launched on 17 April 1943; and commissioned on 26 June 1943.

In mid-August 1943, YMS-402 reported for duty in the Eastern Sea Frontier. For the next year, she operated out of the Naval Frontier Base, Tompkinsville, Staten Island, New York.

On 28 August 1944, she departed that base for San Diego, California, and duty in the central Pacific. Arriving at Eniwetok, Marshall Islands, on 20 November, the motor minesweeper, as a unit of Mine Squadron 102, remained in the Marshall-Gilberts force for the next nine months, conducting local minesweeping, escort, and patrol operations, and making an occasional escort into the Western Carolines. After the cessation of hostilities in the Pacific, she prepared for postwar minesweeping activities; and, at the end of August 1945, she sailed for Okinawa and Japan.

During the fall, she participated in the opening of Nagoya and Wakayama; and, with the new year, 1946, she headed back to the United States. After stops in the Marshalls and in the Hawaiian Islands, she arrived at San Pedro, California, in early April. She remained on the west coast into the summer; and, at the end of June, she sailed for New York, where she was decommissioned on 1 August 1946.

Placed in service again, YMS-402 departed New York on 30 October and moved north to the St. Lawrence, whence she proceeded to Buffalo, where she served as a naval reserve training ship until after the outbreak of war in Korea. Named USS Seagull and redesignated AMS-55 on 1 September 1947 and recommissioned on 10 May 1950, the former YMS returned to the Atlantic in September 1951 and took up training duties in the 5th Naval district. Initially based at Norfolk, Virginia, and then at the Mine Warfare School, Yorktown, Virginia.

She continued to operate out of the Hampton Roads/Virginia Capes area through 1954. Then, in 1955, Seagull, redesignated MSC(O)-55 on 7 February, was transferred to Charleston, South Carolina, whence, for the remainder of her career, she conducted operations which took her along the southeastern Atlantic seaboard, along the ‘gulf coast, and into the Caribbean as a unit of MinRon 4.

In mid-July 1957, the coastal minesweeper departed Charleston for Philadelphia, where she was decommissioned on 11 October and placed in reserve. Her name was struck from the Naval Vessel Register on 1 November 1959.

== Awards and honors ==
YMS-402 earned one battle star for her post-World War II minesweeping activities.
