= Maryland Wildland =

Maryland Wildlands are a group of public properties that are protected from logging or other activities in the state of Maryland.

The Maryland Wildlands Preservation System is the state's counterpart to the federal government's National Wilderness Preservation System. Protected properties are designated as state wildlands by the Maryland General Assembly. These wildlands are owned and managed by the Maryland Department of Natural Resources. Each tract overlaps with all or part of a state park, forest, wildlife management area, or other land unit of the Maryland Department of Natural Resources.

== History ==
In 1971, the Maryland State Legislature passed the Wildlands Protection Act, which began the program of protecting publicly owned areas. As of December 2018, 38 areas had been designated as Maryland Wildlands. representing 65,956 acres (266.91 km^{2}) of Maryland Wildlands.

== Properties ==
=== Garrett County ===
- Savage River State Forest
  - Big Savage Mountain Wildland (1973)
  - Bear Pen Wildland
  - Middle Fork Wildland
  - High Rock Wildland
  - Savage Ravines Wildland
  - South Savage Wildland
  - Upper White Rock Wildland
  - Backbone Mountain Wildland
  - Maple Lick Run Wildland
  - Puzzley Run Wildland

=== Allegany County ===
- Green Ridge State Forest
  - Deep Run Wildland
  - Maple Run Wildland
  - Potomac Bends Wildland
- Rocky Gap State Park
  - Rocky Gap Wildland
- Dan's Mountain Wildlife Management Area
  - Dan’s Mountain Wildland

=== Washington County ===
- Within the Sideling Hill Wildlife Management Area
  - Sideling Hill Wildland

=== Frederick County ===
- Cunningham Falls State Park
  - Cunningham Falls State Park Wildland

=== Frederick and Montgomery Counties ===
- Islands of the Potomac Wildlife Management Area
  - Islands of the Potomac Wildland

=== Baltimore County ===
- North Point State Park
  - Black Marsh Wildland
- Gunpowder Falls State Park
  - Gunpowder Falls Wildland
  - Panther Branch Wildland
  - Sweathouse Branch Wildland
  - Mingo Branch/Bush Cabin Run Wildland
- Soldiers Delight Natural Environmental Area
  - Soldiers Delight Wildland

=== Howard and Montgomery Counties ===
- Patuxent River State Park
  - Patuxent River Wildland

=== Prince George's County ===
- Belt Woods Natural Environment Area
  - Belt Woods Wildland (1997)

=== Calvert County ===
- Calvert Cliffs State Park
  - Calvert Cliffs Wildland
- Parker’s Creek Wildlife Management Area
  - Parker’s Creek Wildland

=== St. Mary's County ===
- St. Mary's River State Park
  - St. Mary's River Wildland

=== Charles County ===
- Mattawoman Natural Environment Area
  - Mattawoman Wildland
- Zekiah Swamp Natural Environment Area
  - Zekiah Swamp Wildland
- Chapman State Park
  - Chapman Wildland

=== Caroline County ===
- Idylwild Wildlife Management Area
  - Idylwild Wildland

=== Worcester County ===
- Pocomoke River State Forest and/or Pocomoke River State Park
  - Pocomoke River Wildland
  - Cypress Swamp Wildland

=== Somerset County ===
- Cedar Island Wildlife Management Area
  - Cedar Island Wildland
- Janes Island State Park
  - Janes Island Wildland
