= Tangier Sound =

- Location within Virginia Location within Maryland Location within the United States
- Coordinates: 38.0626234°N 75.9954899°W
- Type: Bay
- Part of: Chesapeake Bay
- Surface elevation: 0 feet (0 m)

Tangier Sound is a sound of the Chesapeake Bay bounded on the west by Tangier Island in Virginia, and Smith Island and South Marsh Island in Maryland, by Deal Island in Maryland on the north, and the mainland of the Eastern Shore of Maryland and Pocomoke Sound on the east. It stretches into Virginia as far south as Watts Island.

The Manokin, Big Annemessex, and Little Annemessex Rivers all flow into Tangier Sound from Somerset County, Maryland.

Crisfield, Maryland, located on Tangier Sound, is a center of the shellfish industry. Smith Island, Tangier Island and Deal Island also remain centers of the Chesapeake Bay seafood industry and outposts of Chesapeake culture and history. As in other parts of Chesapeake Bay, the seafood industry on Tangier Sound has declined markedly due to pollution, mismanagement and the growth of recreational fishing. However, the wild oyster industry has seen a strong reemergence in recent years due to shell planting and caretaking methods performed by Chesapeake watermen. Tangier Sound is considered by many to possess the best oysters and soft crabs in the world. The Tangier Sound wild fishery is an artisanal fishery and source of iconic seafood.

Several Maryland wildlife management areas border Tangier Sound: South Marsh Island, Deal Island, Fairmount, and Cedar Island areas.

== See also ==
- Battle of Kedges Strait
