= Linkwood =

Linkwood may refer to

- Linkwood (whisky distillery), a distillery and eponymous single malt Scotch whisky
- Linkwood, Maryland an unincorporated community in Maryland, United States
- Linkwood Wildlife Management Area, a wildlife area near that town
