= Pocomoke Sound =

- Location within Virginia
- Location: Accomack County, Virginia King William County, Virginia Somerset, Maryland
- Coordinates: 37°55′17″N 75°49′24″W
- Type: Bay
- Part of: Chesapeake Bay
- Surface elevation: 0 feet (0 m)

Pocomoke Sound is a bay of the Chesapeake Bay that forms part of the boundary between the Eastern Shores of Maryland and Virginia. The Pocomoke River is the largest stream feeding into the Sound, which is bounded by Somerset County, Maryland on the north, Worcester County, Maryland, Accomack County, Virginia, and Beasley Bay on the east, the Chesapeake Bay on the south, and Tangier Sound on the west. Its southwesternmost point may be considered to be Watts Island, Virginia.

In addition to the Pocomoke River, several creeks also flow into Pocomoke Sound: Ape Hole Creek, East Creek, and Marumsco Creek in Maryland, and Bullbegger Creek, Messongo Creek, and Guilford Creek in Virginia.

The Pocomoke Sound and Maryland Marine Properties Wildlife Management Areas lie on the north side of the Sound; the Saxis Wildlife Management Area on the east.

== History ==
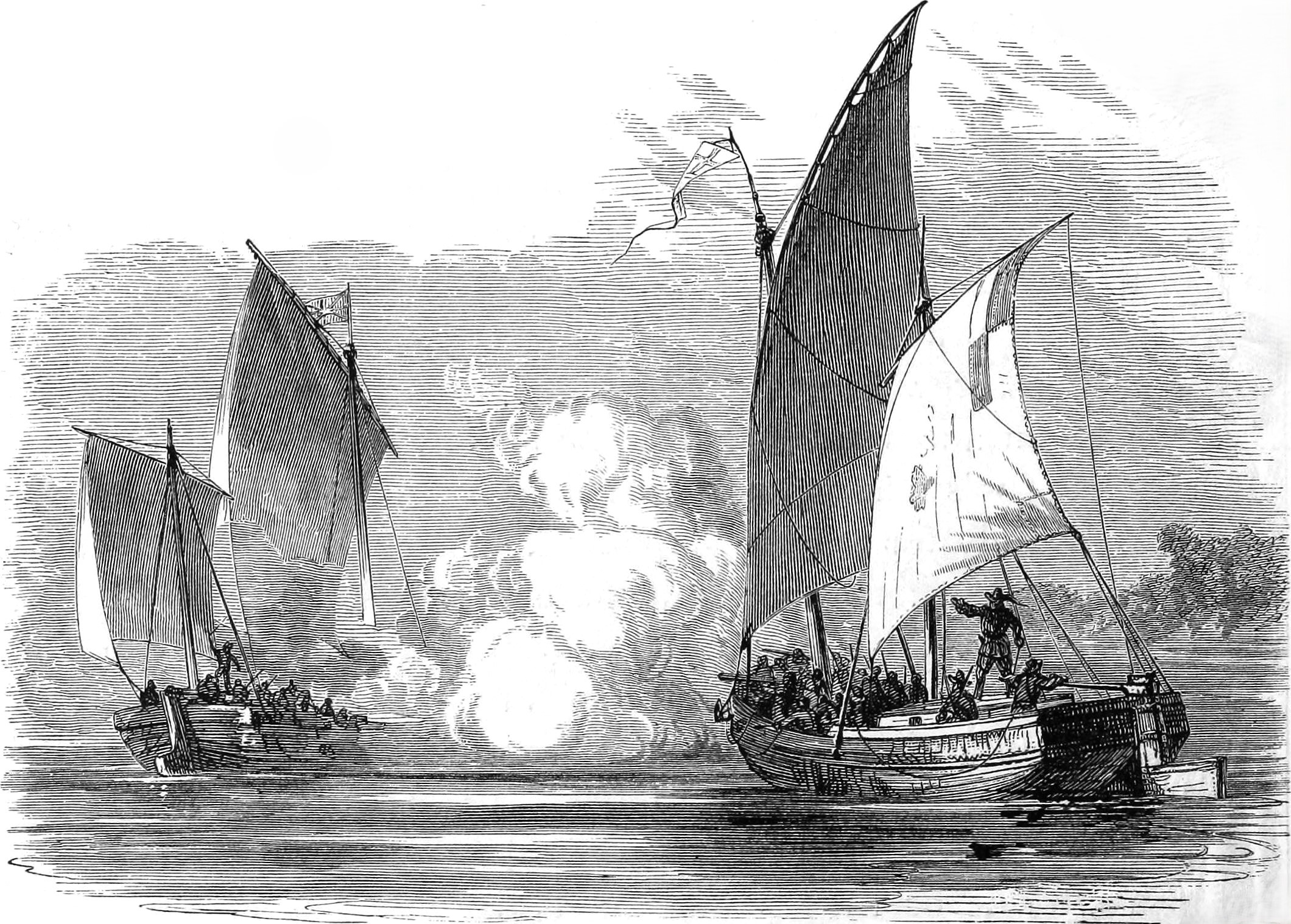
Battle between William Claiborne and Thomas Cornwallis, 1635

In 1635 the Sound was the scene of the first recorded naval battle in North America between Englishmen. The dispute was between the Virginia Company and Lord Baltimore, the proprietor of the Maryland Colony and William Claiborne over the rights to Kent Island. The dispute was eventually resolved with a victory for the Maryland colonists.

In 1785, after years of disputes over fishing in the Sound and on the Pocomoke River, Maryland and Virginia entered into an interstate compact that regulated fishing in the area, established a common and free waterway, and covered how criminal trials concerning each other's citizens should be handled. In Wharton v. Wise, 153 U.S. 155 (1894), the Supreme Court of the United States determined that Pocomoke Sound was not covered by this famous interstate compact.
