= List of parks in the Baltimore–Washington metropolitan area =

The 15 largest contiguous public parks-preserves within 30 miles (48 km) of either Baltimore, Md. or Washington, D.C.

The list contains the largest^{[b]} contiguous public parks-preserves within 30 miles (48 km) of either Baltimore, Maryland or Washington, D.C., which is within the Baltimore–Washington metropolitan area.

1. Prince William Forest^{[a]} - Locust Shade, Virginia; 18,255 acres (74 km^{2}) — about one-third is closed to the public
2. Patuxent Wildlife Research Refuge^{[a]} - Fran Uhler (Patuxent River Park), Maryland; 13,300 acres (54 km^{2}) — about one-third is closed to the public
3. Seneca Creek - McKee-Beshers - C & O Canal - Germantown, Maryland / Algonkian, Virginia; 12,435 acres (50 km^{2})
4. Upper Patapsco, Maryland; 9,575 acres (39 km^{2})
5. Patuxent River Park - Merkle - Jug Bay Wetlands - House Creek, Maryland; 8,759 acres (35 km^{2})
6. Mason Neck - Accotink Bay - Pohick - Meadowwood - Gunston^{[a]}, Virginia; 7,690 acres (31 km^{2})
7. Patuxent River State Park, Maryland; 6,650 acres (27 km^{2})
8. Chapmans - Myrtle Grove - Mattawoman, Maryland; 6,278 acres (25 km^{2})
9. Sugarloaf Mountain^{[a]} - Monocacy River - C & O Canal, Maryland; 5,790 acres (23 km^{2})
10. Lower Gunpowder Falls, Maryland; 5,325 acres (22 km^{2})
11. Manassas Battlefield, Virginia; 4,355 acres (18 km^{2})
12. Little Bennett, Maryland; 3,700 acres (15 km^{2})
13. Great Falls, Virginia - C & O Canal, Maryland - Riverbend, Virginia - Scott's Run, Virginia - Carderock, Maryland; 3,440 acres (14 km^{2})
14. Lower Patapsco - Rockburn Branch, Maryland; 3,435 acres (14 km^{2})
15. Cedarville, Maryland; 2,848 acres (12 km^{2})
16. Smithsonian Environmental Research Center^{[a]} Maryland; 2,800 acres (11 km^{2}) - limited public access
17. Upper Gunpowder Falls (Hereford), Maryland; 2,755 acres (11 km^{2})
18. Rock Creek Regional (Lake Needwood - North Branch); 2,670 acres (11 km^{2})
19. Susquehanna State Park, Maryland; 2,645 acres (11 km^{2})
20. Fountainhead, Virginia; 2,450 acres (10 km^{2})
21. Nanjemoy Creek^{[a]}, Maryland; 2,415 acres (10 km^{2}) - generally closed to the public
22. Mid-Gunpowder Falls (Baldwin-Fork), Maryland; 2,300 acres (9 km^{2})
23. Eastern Neck, Maryland; 2,285 acres (9 km^{2})
24. Douglas Point - Mallows Bay - Purse State Park (Nanjemoy Wildlife Area), Maryland; 1,920 acres (8 km^{2})
25. Soldiers Delight, Maryland; 1,920 acres (8 km^{2})
26. Rock Creek Park, D.C.; 1,754 acres (7 km^{2})

== Notes ==
^{a} - only a portion of this park is publicly accessible
^{b} - This list does not include interrupted, scattered parts of administrative units, but rather entire, contiguous park-preserve tracts. Strip park area (<1000 foot (300 m) width for more than 1/2 mile (800 m)) and public utility land (reservoirs) are excluded. Much of the 72,500 acres (293 km^{2}) Aberdeen Proving Grounds, Maryland. and 56,000 acres (230 km^{2}) Quantico Marine Base, Virginia are undeveloped, and constitute the largest such areas within 30 miles (48 km) of either Baltimore or Washington. Neither is generally open to the public. Quantico is contiguous with Prince William Forest Park. Washington and Baltimore are 33 miles (53 km) apart.
