= List of Maryland wildlife management areas =

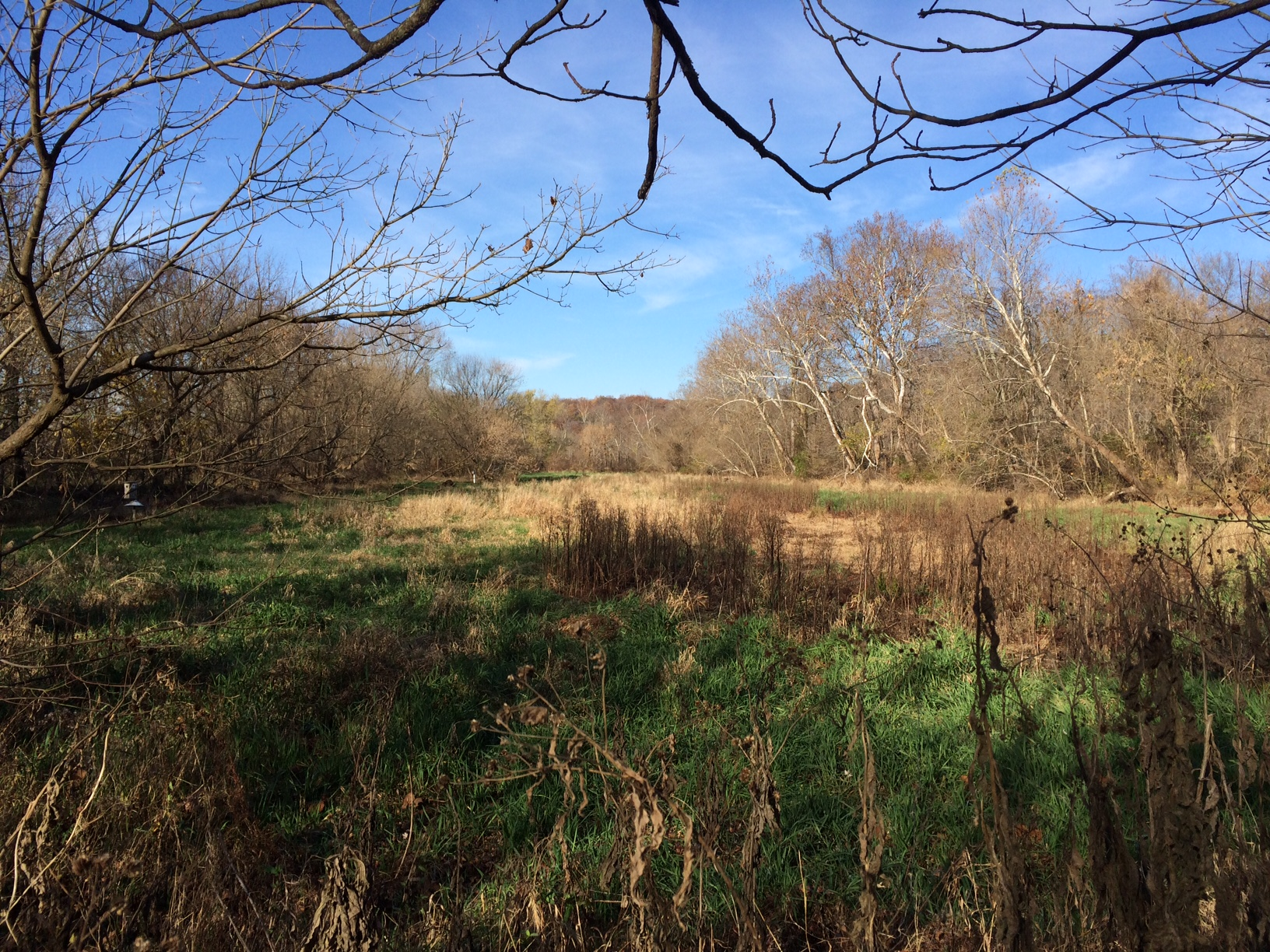
Dierssen Wildlife Management Area in Montgomery County, Maryland

This is a list of Maryland wildlife management areas. As of 2016, the state of Maryland owned and managed sixty-one wildlife management areas (WMAs) covering 123,530 acres (499.9 km^{2}) of land.

== Management ==
Maryland wildlife management areass are managed by the Wildlife and Heritage Service of the Maryland Department of Natural Resources. Management focuses on developing wildlife habitat and providing publicly accessible space for hunting, fishing and trapping; low-impact non-hunting use is also permitted on many properties.

== List of Maryland wildlife management areas ==
The following table lists all WMAs owned and managed by Maryland as of 2016. It does not include Cooperative Wildlife Management Areas, which are managed by Maryland but owned by various other entities.

WMA name	County or counties	Region	Area	Notes
Avondale	Carroll	Central	177 acres (0.72 km^{2})	
Belle Grove	Allegany	Western	356 acres (1.44 km^{2})	
Bodkin Island	Queen Anne's	Eastern	1 acre (0.0040 km^{2})	
Billmeyer	Allegany	Western	758 acres (3.07 km^{2})	
Bowen	Prince George's	Southern	313 acres (1.27 km^{2})	Accessible only by boat
Cedar Island	Somerset	Eastern	3,081 acres (12.47 km^{2})	Accessible only by boat
Cedar Point	Charles	Southern	1,914 acres (7.75 km^{2})	
Cheltenham	Prince George's	Southern	10 acres (0.040 km^{2})	
Chicamuxen	Charles	Southern	382 acres (1.55 km^{2})	
Chicone Creek	Dorchester	Eastern	234 acres (0.95 km^{2})	
Cunningham Swamp	Garrett	Western	257 acres (1.04 km^{2})	
Dan's Mountain	Allegany	Western	9,596 acres (38.83 km^{2})	
Deal Island	Somerset	Eastern	13,565 acres (54.90 km^{2})	
Devil Island Area	Worcester	Eastern	47 acres (0.19 km^{2})	
Dierssen	Montgomery	Central	40 acres (0.16 km^{2})	Designated as a wildlife sanctuary; hunting and trapping not permitted.
E.A. Vaughn	Worcester	Eastern	2,769 acres (11.21 km^{2})	
Earleville	Cecil	Central	190 acres (0.77 km^{2})	
Ellis Bay	Wicomico	Eastern	3,208 acres (12.98 km^{2})	
Fairmount	Somerset	Eastern	5,224 acres (21.14 km^{2})	
Fishing Bay	Dorchester	Eastern	30,019 acres (121.48 km^{2})	Located adjacent to Blackwater National Wildlife Refuge
Fort Hill	Allegany	Western	103 acres (0.42 km^{2})	
Globe Com	Anne Arundel	Southern	207 acres (0.84 km^{2})	
Gravel Hill Swamp	Frederick	Western	69 acres (0.28 km^{2})	
Grove Farm	Cecil	Central	745 acres (3.01 km^{2})	
Gwynnbrook	Baltimore	Central	88 acres (0.36 km^{2})	The oldest WMA in Maryland; established in 1919.
Heater's Island	Frederick	Western	194 acres (0.79 km^{2})	Located within the Potomac River and accessible only by boat.
Hopkins Branch	Harford	Central	20 acres (0.081 km^{2})	
Hugg-Thomas	Howard, Carroll	Central	274 acres (1.11 km^{2})	
Idylwild	Caroline	Eastern	3,578 acres (14.48 km^{2})	
Indian Springs	Washington	Western	6,596 acres (26.69 km^{2})	
Islands of the Potomac	Allegany, Washington, Frederick, Montgomery	Central	1,158 acres (4.69 km^{2})	Encompasses thirty islands within the Potomac River.
Isle of Wight	Worcester	Eastern	224 acres (0.91 km^{2})	
Johnson	Wicomico	Eastern	153 acres (0.62 km^{2})	
Kent Island Research Center	Queen Anne's	Eastern	31 acres (0.13 km^{2})	
LeCompte	Dorchester	Eastern	485 acres (1.96 km^{2})	
Linkwood	Dorchester	Eastern	313 acres (1.27 km^{2})	
Little Patuxent Oxbow	Anne Arundel	Southern	50 acres (0.20 km^{2})	
Maryland Marine Properties	Somerset	Eastern	1,030 acres (4.2 km^{2})	
McIntosh Run	St. Mary's	Southern	81 acres (0.33 km^{2})	
McKee-Beshers	Montgomery	Central	1,971 acres (7.98 km^{2})	
Millington	Kent	Eastern	3,943 acres (15.96 km^{2})	
Mt. Nebo	Garrett	Western	1,854 acres (7.50 km^{2})	
Myrtle Grove	Charles	Southern	4,817 acres (19.49 km^{2})	
Nanjemoy	Charles	Southern	1,830 acres (7.4 km^{2})	
Nanjemoy Creek	Charles	Southern	233 acres (0.94 km^{2})	
Nanticoke River	Wicomico, Dorchester	Eastern	2,268 acres (9.18 km^{2})	
Old Bohemia	Cecil	Central	1,004 acres (4.06 km^{2})	
Parker's Creek	Calvert	Southern	1,877 acres (7.60 km^{2})	
Pocomoke River	Worcester	Eastern	1,008 acres (4.08 km^{2})	
Pocomoke Sound	Somerset	Eastern	922 acres (3.73 km^{2})	Accessible only by boat
Prather's Neck	Washington	Western	215 acres (0.87 km^{2})	
Ridenour Swamp	Frederick	Western	82 acres (0.33 km^{2})	
Riverside	Charles	Southern	676 acres (2.74 km^{2})	
Sideling Hill	Allegany, Washington	Western	3,466 acres (14.03 km^{2})	
Sinepuxent Bay	Worcester	Eastern	93 acres (0.38 km^{2})	Accessible only by boat
South Marsh Island	Dorchester, Somerset	Eastern	2,969 acres (12.02 km^{2})	Accessible only by boat
Strider	Montgomery	Central	267 acres (1.08 km^{2})	
Tar Bay	Dorchester	Eastern	12 acres (0.049 km^{2})	Accessible only by boat
Taylor's Island	Dorchester	Eastern	1,114 acres (4.51 km^{2})	
Warrior Mountain	Allegany	Western	5,048 acres (20.43 km^{2})	
Wellington	Somerset	Eastern	428 acres (1.73 km^{2})	
Wetipquin	Wicomico	Eastern	87 acres (0.35 km^{2})	

== See also ==
- List of Maryland state forests
- List of National Wildlife Refuges in Maryland
- Natural Environment Area (Maryland)
