= Saxis, Virginia =

- Town
- Location in Accomack County and the state of Virginia.
- Coordinates: 37°55′33″N 75°43′23″W
- Country: United States
- State: Virginia
- County: Accomack

Area
  - Total: 0.41 sq mi (1.06 km^{2})
  - Land: 0.41 sq mi (1.05 km^{2})
  - Water: 0.0039 sq mi (0.01 km^{2})
- Elevation: 7 ft (2.1 m)

Population (2020)
  - Total: 172
  - Estimate (2019): 231
  - Density: 571.0/sq mi (220.48/km^{2})
- Time zone: UTC−5 (Eastern (EST))
  - Summer (DST): UTC−4 (EDT)
- ZIP code: 23427
- Area codes: 757, 948
- FIPS code: 51-70576
- GNIS feature ID: 1500033
- Website: https://saxis.org/

Saxis is a town in Accomack County, Virginia, United States. As of the 2020 census, Saxis had a population of 172.

== History ==
Saxis Island juts into Pocomoke Sound and is separated from the rest of Accomack County by Freeschool Marsh. The community that exists on the island began as a single farmstead. The community grew in size throughout the 1800s and was incorporated in 1959.

From as early as 8,000 BCE through the period of European contact in the seventeenth century, prehistoric populations periodically visited Saxis Island, probably to procure plants, shellfish, and game from its rich marine and marsh environments. The earliest documentary related to Saxis occurs on Capt. John Smith's map of the Chesapeake Bay region and in his published description of an exploratory voyage in the summer of 1608. During a foray up the Pocomoke Sound, Smith and his party encountered a village inhabited by the Pocomoke Indians along the south shore of the sound. By the 1630s, though, fur traders based in Maryland and rival Virginia traders on Kent Island were active all along the bay side of the Eastern Shore. Due to its isolation—separated from the Eastern Shore mainland by maritime tidal marsh and bounded by water on the north, south, and west—the peninsula has been known as Saxis Island since European settlers and speculators claimed land there beginning in 1661. When land was first patented by European settlers in 1666, Saxis Island was divided into two sections; the north end, the 150-acre property of Robert Sikes was known as “Sikes’s Island,” and the remaining 200-acre parcel to the south was owned by George Parker who called his land “St. George’s Island.” The division is still partly visible by a drainage ditch along Saxis Road.

By 1860, the population had risen to 169 residents, including 15 free blacks. Early in the Civil War, Pocomoke Sound became a center of smuggling supplies for Confederates through a Union blockade of the Chesapeake Bay. Marking the line between the Union (Maryland) and Confederacy (Virginia), smugglers could easily cross from one zone to another without detection. In response, a Union naval flotilla was sent to patrol the local waters and interrupt smuggling operations. On November 16, 1861, the Union Army quickly marched south from the Maryland line and occupied the Eastern Shore of Virginia unopposed. At the same time shore parties from three Union ships came ashore on Saxis to obtain supplies. After the Union gained control of the Eastern Shore, local tradition holds, at least two vessels from Saxis engaged in blockade running, carrying supplies to Confederate troops in Virginia on the western shore of the Chesapeake Bay. Besides the unconfirmed oral tradition of local blockade runners, Saxis is mentioned in Union reports and correspondence as the site of capture of blockade running vessels based in other ports of the Eastern Shore.

Fishing and oyster dredging prospered as commercial enterprises on the island beginning in the 1860s. In 1866, the extension of the Pennsylvania Railroad to nearby Crisfield, Maryland, helped to spur local growth of commercial oystering. The seafood industry on Saxis boomed at the beginning of the twentieth century, with the 1903 construction of an unconnected wharf 650 yards offshore at the edge of the shipping channel. After the Civil War, the steamers "Maggie" and "The Eastern Shore" carried the seafood products of Saxis to the Northern cities. The steamers also brought many visitors to Saxis at that time.

== Recreation ==
The Saxis fishing pier was completed in 2002. The pier extends 200 feet into Saxis Harbor and terminates with a 100-foot T-head. The pier is often used for public fishing. It is handicapped-accessible and ADA-compliant.

The town abuts the 6,177-acre Saxis Wildlife Management Area, which is owned and managed by the Virginia Department of Game and Inland Fisheries. The Saxis Wildlife Management Area is predominately tidal marshland, divided into three tracts totaling approximately 5,678 acres. All three tracts are peninsulas, bordered by the brackish waters of Beasley Bay, Pocomoke Sound or Messongo Creek, or several smaller freshwater creeks. Forested high ground, or hummocks, occupy portions of the area farthest inland. Maintained primarily in its natural state, there is little active management or development in the area.

The town is also home to the Saxis Island Museum, a nonprofit created to preserve the history of Saxis Island and to document the lives of the people that made a living in the waters of the Chesapeake Bay.

== Geography ==
Saxis is located at 37°55′33″N 75°43′23″W (37.925825, −75.723184).

According to the United States Census Bureau, the town has a total area of 0.42 square miles (1.1 km^{2}), of which 0.42 square miles (1.1 km^{2}) is land and 0.004 square miles (0.01 km^{2}), or 1.30%, is water. Although water does not completely surround Saxis Island, the name is appropriate because of the landform's geographic isolation. Separated from the mainland by the maritime tidal Freeschool Marsh on the east, Saxis is bounded by shallow waters on the south (Starling Creek), west (Pocomoke Sound), and north (Robin Hood Bay).

It has an elevation of 7 feet.

== Industry ==
The harbor is a local hub of economic activity. The fisheries industry is based around the southern end of Saxis near the harbor. This area is classified as an Intensely Developed Area (IDA) according to the requirements of the Chesapeake Bay Preservation Act. It is also zoned commercial-waterfront (C-W). This area is intended to provide space for activities and services relating to the seafood industry.

== Demographics ==
Historical population
Census	Pop.	Note	%±
1960	577		—
1970	451		−21.8%
1980	415		−8.0%
1990	367		−11.6%
2000	337		−8.2%
2010	241		−28.5%
2020	172		−28.6%
U.S. Decennial Census

As of the census of 2000, there were 337 people, 148 households, and 100 families residing in the town. The population density was 1,020.8 people per square mile (394.3/km^{2}). There were 193 housing units at an average density of 584.6 per square mile (225.8/km^{2}). The racial makeup of the town was 97.63% White, 0.89% African American, 1.19% from other races, and 0.30% from two or more races. Hispanic or Latino of any race were 0.89% of the population.

There were 148 households, out of which 19.6% had children under the age of 18 living with them, 50.7% were married couples living together, 11.5% had a female householder with no husband present, and 31.8% were non-families. 26.4% of all households were made up of individuals, and 16.9% had someone living alone who was 65 years of age or older. The average household size was 2.28 and the average family size was 2.71.

In the town, the population was spread out, with 16.6% under the age of 18, 5.3% from 18 to 24, 24.6% from 25 to 44, 27.3% from 45 to 64, and 26.1% who were 65 years of age or older. The median age was 47 years. For every 100 females, there were 92.6 males. For every 100 females aged 18 and over, there were 96.5 males.

The median income for a household in the town was $18,125, and the median income for a family was $23,333. Males had a median income of $26,750 versus $19,250 for females. The per capita income for the town was $13,404. About 17.9% of families and 19.9% of the population were below the poverty line, including 15.1% of those under age 18 and 31.9% of those age 65 or over.
