= Manokin River =

River in Maryland

Coordinates: 38°5′35″N 75°55′0″W

Manokin River is a river in Somerset County, Maryland, that flows into Tangier Sound, an arm of the Chesapeake Bay. The Manokin (locally /məˈnoʊkɪn/) rises east of Princess Anne, Maryland, flows through the town, then widens into a tidal estuary. Tributaries along the river's 17-mile (27 km) length are Kings Creek, Back Creek, St. Peters Creek, Broad Creek, and Fishing Creek. During the colonial period, the Manokin was navigable as far as Princess Anne.

The Manokin Historic District is located on both sides of the river near its mouth.

Much of the Deal Island Wildlife Management Area is on the north side of the river; a small section of the Fairmount Wildlife Management Area is on the south.

Major General Arnold Elzey (1816-1871) was born on the "Elmwood" plantation along the Manokin River.
