= Pocomoke River Wildlife Management Area =

Nature reserve in Maryland

Coordinates: 38°6′4″N 75°30′15″W

Pocomoke River Wildlife Management Area, Maryland, USA
- Interactive map of Pocomoke River Wildlife Management Area, Maryland, USA
- Location: Worcester County, Maryland, USA
- Nearest city: Pocomoke City, Maryland
- Area: 1,016 acres (4.11 km^{2})
- Governing body: Maryland Department of Natural Resources

The Pocomoke River Wildlife Management Area is a state-run nature reserve found on the southern banks of the Pocomoke River in Worcester County, Maryland.

The Pocomoke River WMA encompasses an area of 1,016 acres (4.11 km^{2}) that is a combination of farmland, woodlands and wetlands situated in the cypress swamp of southern Worcester County, north of Pocomoke City. The northern boundary of the reserve adjoins the Pocomoke River State Forest. The reserve is home to a range of plant life, such as loblolly pine, bald cypress and white dogwood, pink laurel in the spring. There is also a diverse array of local and migratory animal species, including white-tailed deer and bald eagles.

The Pocomoke River Wildlife Management Area allows for hunting during legal hunting seasons, as well as other recreational activities such as hiking, bird watching, and boating.
