= Chrome (soil) =

Soil series found in Pennsylvania and Maryland

The Chrome series is a well-drained, medium-textured soil which has developed on weathered residues of ultramafic rock, such as serpentinite, in parts of Pennsylvania and Maryland. Because it is a residual soil, the underlying bedrock is of dominating importance in determining the soil's characteristics.

As a consequence of the ultramafic bedrock, the Chrome series supports pine-prairie vegetation which is stunted by comparison with the mixed hardwood forests on surrounding non-ultramafic bedrock. Virginia pine is invasive in some areas. The Chrome series is one of the most common soils in the Soldiers Delight Natural Environment Area.
