= Old Bohemia Wildlife Management Area =

Protected area in Maryland, US

Coordinates: 39°26′1″N 75°48′21″W

Old Bohemia Wildlife Management Area is a Wildlife Management Area in Cecil County, Maryland, United States.
