= Mt. Nebo Wildlife Management Area =

Protected area in Maryland, United States

- Mount Nebo Wildlife Management Area
- Location within Maryland Location within the United States
- Location: Garrett County, Maryland
- Nearest city: Oakland, Maryland
- Coordinates: 39°26′52″N 79°23′17″W
- Area: 1,887 acres (7.64 km^{2})
- Established: 2006
- Governing body: Maryland Department of Natural Resources

Mt. Nebo Wildlife Management Area is a Wildlife Management Area in Garrett County, Maryland.
