= Wharton v. Wise =

- Supreme Court of the United States

Argued March 5–6, 1894 Decided April 23, 1894
- Full case name: Wharton v. Wise
- Citations: 153 U.S. 155 (more) 14 S. Ct. 783; 38 L. Ed. 669; 1894 U.S. LEXIS 2172

Holding
- Writ of habeas corpus is denied; a Maryland citizen's right to fish in Pocomoke Sound is not protected by the Maryland–Virginia Compact of 1785, and the compact does not prohibit Virginia from trying a citizen of Maryland for crimes committed in the area covered by the compact.

Court membership
- Chief Justice Melville Fuller Associate Justices Stephen J. Field · John M. Harlan; Horace Gray · David J. Brewer; Henry B. Brown · George Shiras Jr. Howell E. Jackson · Edward D. White

Case opinion
- Majority: Field, joined by unanimous

Laws applied
- Article I, Section 10, Clause 3

Wharton v. Wise, 153 U.S. 155 (1894), is a 9-to-0 ruling by the Supreme Court of the United States, which denied a citizen of the state of Maryland a writ of habeas corpus. The appellant, tried and convicted of illegally harvesting oysters from Pocomoke Sound in the Chesapeake Bay, had argued that his right to fish was protected by an interstate compact and that this compact also barred the state of Virginia from trying him. The Supreme Court disagreed on both counts.

== Background ==
The states and citizens of Maryland and Virginia had long disputed who had rights to fish in the mouth of the Pocomoke River (known as "Pocomoke Sound") where it emptied into Chesapeake Bay. Maryland occupied the sound's northern side, while Virginia occupied its southern side. In 1785, the two states entered into a compact, which declared Pocomoke Sound, the Potomac River (which they also shared as a common border), and the Chesapeake Bay a common waterway, and each state pledged not to interfere with the other's water-borne traffic via tax, duty, prohibition, or restraint. The seventh clause of the Maryland–Virginia Compact of 1785 provided that "the right of fishing in the [Potomac River] shall be common to and equally enjoyed by the citizens of both states, provided that such common right be not exercised by the citizens of the one state to the hindrance or disturbance of the fisheries on the shores of the other state, and that the citizens of neither state shall have a right to fish with nets or seines on the shores of the other." The eighth clause addressed both the Potomac and Pocomoke Rivers, and provided that all "laws and regulations which may be necessary for the preservation of fish, or for the performance of quarantine in the River Potowmack, or for preserving and keeping open the channel and navigation thereof, or of the River Pocomoke, within the limits of Virginia, by preventing the throwing out ballast or giving any other obstruction thereto, shall be made with the mutual consent and approbation of both states." Under the compact's tenth clause, crimes committed on these common waterways were to be tried thusly: Virginians committing offenses against Marylanders should be tried in Maryland courts, Marylanders committing offenses against Virginians should be tried in Virginian courts, and citizens of neither state committing crimes against either Marylanders or Virginians should be tried in Virginian courts.

In 1892 Virginia passed a law barring all non-Virginians from harvesting oysters or any other shellfish from the Pocomoke River or Pocomoke Sound.

In March 1893, Robert Wharton, a citizen of Maryland, was arrested by Virginia law enforcement authorities for harvesting oysters from Pocomoke Sound. Wharton argued at trial that the Compact of 1785 permitted him to fish without restriction in Pocomoke Sound, and that since the Virginia law had not been adopted by the state of Maryland there was no restriction on his activities. He also argued that, under the compact, Virginia had no right to try him. Virginia filed a demurrer, which the trial court sustained. Wharton was convicted. The defendant now filed a writ of habeas corpus against John H. Wise, Sheriff of the Accomack County, Virginia. The writ was heard by the United States district court for the eastern district of Virginia, which denied the writ. The defendant appealed to the U.S. Supreme Court.

== Ruling ==
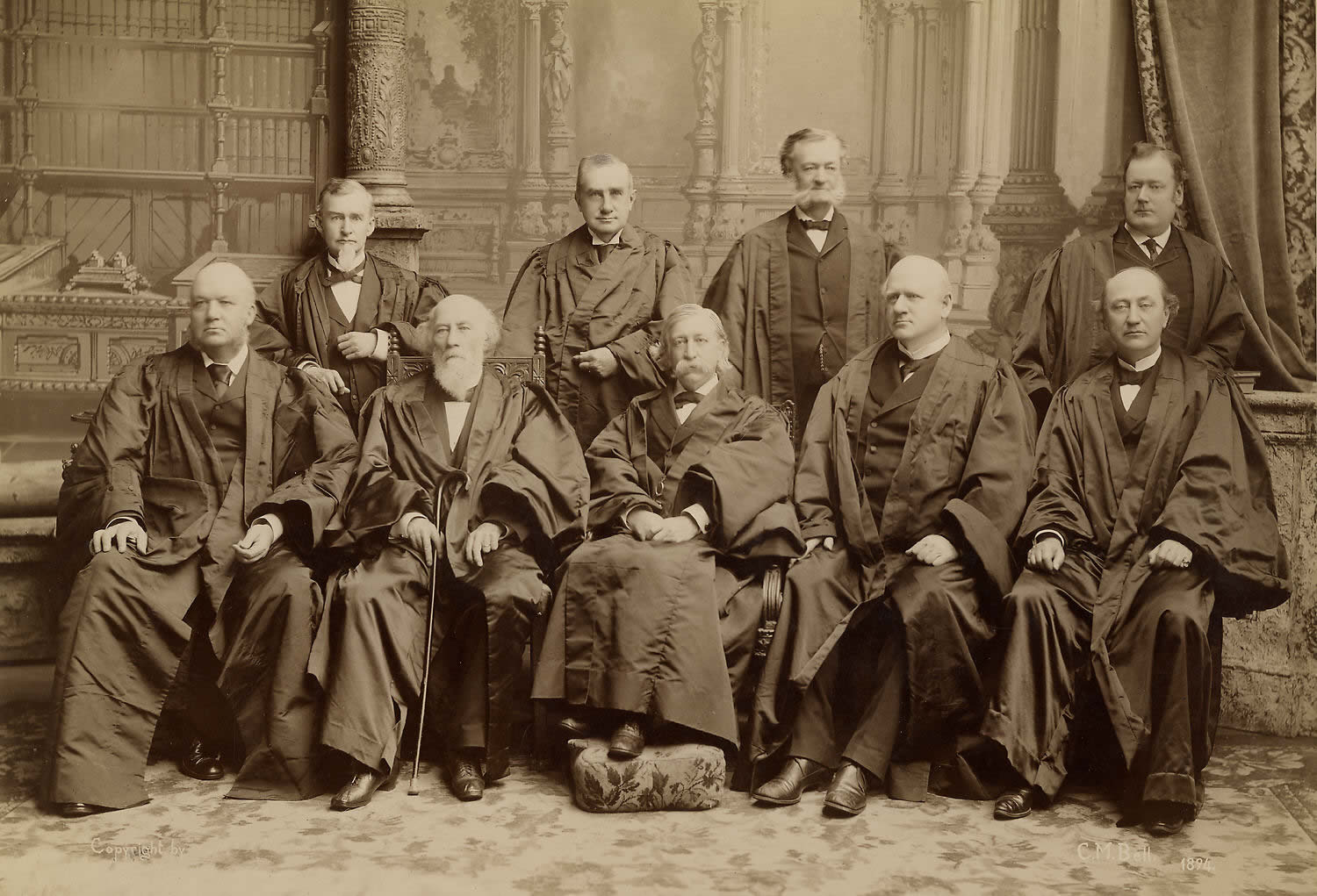
The Fuller Court.

Associate Justice Stephen Johnson Field wrote the majority opinion for the Court.

Justice Field briefly reviewed the background of the Compact of 1785, as well as the language of its relevant sections.

Virginia had questioned the validity of the Compact of 1785, suggesting it violated Article 6 of the Articles of Confederation (which banned treaties between states without the consent of the United States Congress) and was superseded at any rate by the U.S. Constitution (which entered into force in 1789). Field dismissed both claims. The Articles of Confederation prohibited pacts intended to weaken the Confederation, Field said, and did not ban all pacts between states. Although provisions of the compact could be superseded by the Constitution, none of the operative articles of it were; in fact, Maryland, Virginia, and the United States government have all treated the compact as if it were still binding and enforceable. Field relied heavily on Virginia v. Tennessee, 148 U.S. 503 (1893), decided in the prior term, in defining what a "compact" was and the extent of the Constitution's prohibition on them. But Field not only concluded that the Compact of 1785 was not in violation of the Articles of Confederation but also strongly asserted that the Constitution did not apply to those already in force at the time of its adoption:

In our judgment, the Compact of 1785 was not prohibited by the Articles of Confederation. It was not a treaty, confederation, or alliance within the meaning of those terms as there used, and it remained as a subsisting operative contract between them, in full force, when the confederation went out of existence upon the adoption of the present Constitution of the United States, and it was not affected or set aside by the prohibitory clause of that instrument. Its prohibition extends only to future agreements or compacts, not against those already in existence, except so far as their stipulations might affect subjects placed under the control of Congress, such as commerce and the navigation of public waters, which is included under the power to regulate commerce. Furthermore, Field said, both states as recently as 1874 had agreed that the Compact of 1785 remained valid and in force.

Field now turned the Court's attention to the construction of the actual clauses contained in the compact. Field observed that Article 7 of the compact contained no reference to the Pocomoke, and so was irrelevant to the issue at hand. Article 8 likewise contained no relevant language, he said. Field rejected as wrongly decided Hendricks v. Commonwealth, 75 Va. 939, (1882), a decision by the Virginia Court of Appeals (which gave equal fishing rights in the Potomac and Pocomoke), because that court drew its conclusion based on a mis-quoted Article 8. Lastly, Field noted that at no time was Pocomoke Sound ever considered merely a part of the Pocomoke River. The two bodies of water were, at the time the compact was entered into, and for many years thereafter, considered distinct bodies of water, and Pocomoke Sound was not covered by the Compact of 1785.

Finally, Field argued that the crime Wharton committed was a crime against the state of Virginia, not against one of her citizens. Since a crime against the state itself was not mentioned in the Compact of 1785, Virginia was entirely within her rights to try, convict, and punish Wharton.

The writ of habeas corpus was denied.

== Bibliography ==
- Sansonetti, Thomas and Quast, Sylvia. "Not Just a Western Issue Anymore: Water Disputes in the Eastern United States." Cumberland Law Review. 34:185 (2003).
- Wennersten, John R. The Oyster Wars of Chesapeake Bay. Washington, D.C.: Eastern Branch Press, 2007.
