= Belle Grove Wildlife Management Area =

State Wildlife Management Area in Allegany County, Maryland

Coordinates: 39°41′34″N 78°21′58″W

Belle Grove Wildlife Management Area is a Wildlife Management Area in Allegany County, Maryland.
