= Isaac Tyson =

American mining businessman

Isaac Tyson Jr. (1792–1861) was a Quaker businessman from Baltimore, Maryland, who held a virtual monopoly on world supplies of chromium minerals during the mid-19th century and a very successful entrepreneur and industrialist.

== Biography ==
The son of Baltimore flour merchant Jesse Tyson senior, and his wife Margaret, the younger Tyson studied geology, mineralogy, and chemistry in France, skills which he would use to great advantages during his industrial career.

He first began mining chromite on his farm at Bare Hills in surrounding rural Baltimore County some time after 1808. The sight of a piece of chromite being used to prop a barrel at a Bel Air market in Harford County, Maryland, led him to investigate its source. Tyson was among the first to make the connection between the occurrence of chromite and serpentine barrens, areas of sparse vegetation on metal-rich and inhospitable serpentine deposits. One of these was Soldiers Delight, near northwestern Baltimore County's Owings Mills area. Tyson began mining chromite here in 1827. He commenced buying up serpentine barrens wherever he could find them. The primary belt extended from Maryland into the southern counties of Pennsylvania, including the Nottingham, Pennsylvania serpentine barrens and the Wood Farm in Lancaster County, Pennsylvania, which would become the world's largest single chromite mining site during his ownership. Having bought up all the significant chromite sites in Pennsylvania, Maryland, and Virginia, Tyson found himself with a world monopoly on chromite as the original earlier discovered chromium sources in Siberia (eastern Russian Empire) petered out.

Not content to confine his efforts to chromium ores, he also prospected for copper, and investigated the Strafford, Vermont, copper mines in 1828. He was involved in the Ely Mine, and by 1830, had become a partner with the local Binney family in working copper deposits on Copperas Hill, in Strafford. He personally supervised the construction and operation of six small furnaces nearby in 1833 and 1834, hoping to introduce hot blast techniques, using hard anthracite coal, to refining copper from the refractory pyrrhotite ores of the deposit. This was a very novel venture for the time, as hot blast was only just being considered for iron smelting. The furnaces were shut down in 1835 during public riots over city bank closings or 1837 due to financial difficulties during the financial panic and recession of the time (though not any particular deficiency of his smelting methods), but he retained a half-share in mineral rights at the site, which was worked sporadically for the remainder of his life.

While prospecting for copper in Vermont, he also discovered iron ore in the valley of the Black River along the Connecticut River in 1835. He set up Tyson Furnace near Plymouth, Vermont to smelt it, and the furnace operated until his retirement in 1855.

In 1845, he established the Baltimore Chrome Works company factory on the waterfront of the Northwest Branch of the Patapsco River of the Baltimore Harbor, at the western end of the Fells Point neighborhood (near modern skyscrapers development at Harbor East in the 1990s and subsequently the site of the long-time chrome works, last owned/operated by Allied-Signal in the 1980s and renamed as "Harbor Point" with a major controversial redevelopment project proposed in 2015 over the heavily-polluted capped soil surface).

Baltimore Chrome Works was one of the largest facilities in the country then to refine the chromite into pigments, the primary use of the mineral at the time. Until then, this work had largely been done abroad, in Liverpool, England and elsewhere, and he continued to export chromite to manufacturers there. The expansion into pigment production helped cushion the shock when chromite deposits were discovered in Asia Minor (modern Turkey) in 1848 and began to supplant U.S. chromium ores. He continued iron and copper explorations, opening the Springfield Mine for those two metals in Sykesville, Maryland in southern Carroll County, just west of Bare Hills in 1849.

Tyson married Hannah A. Wood, by whom he had at least four children:

- Rachel Tyson (1807?–1883), married John Jackson and established the Sharon Female Academy in Sharon, Pennsylvania
- Richard W. Tyson
- Jesse Tyson (1826–1906)
- James Wood Tyson (1828–1900)

He purchased a large mansion townhouse on East Baltimore Street near Lloyd Street in the Old Town neighborhood, just east of the Jones Falls, and later established and further endowed the McKim School, a free school for the poor (elementary/grammar school level) in a landmark Greek Revival architecture style stone temple structure a block away, (still existent in 2017), prior to the formal establishment of city public schools in 1829.

In the 1850s, he bought the Elba Furnace in Maryland for youngest son James to operate, and both James and Jesse followed him into the metallurgical profession.

Tyson was posthumously inducted into the National Mining Hall of Fame in 1996.
