= Cheltenham Wildlife Management Area =

State Wildlife Management Area in Maryland, US

- Location within Maryland
- Location: Prince George's, Maryland, United States
- Coordinates: 38°44′14″N 76°49′15″W
- Area: 25 acres (10 ha)
- Operator: Maryland Department of Natural Resources
- Website: Cheltenham WMA

Cheltenham Wildlife Management Area is a Wildlife Management Area in Prince George's County, Maryland. The 25-acre (10 ha) reserve is primarily used for recreation and for dove hunting. The area includes a public archery range.
