= Millington Wildlife Management Area =

Protected area in Maryland, United States

Millington WMA
- IUCN category IV (habitat/species management area)
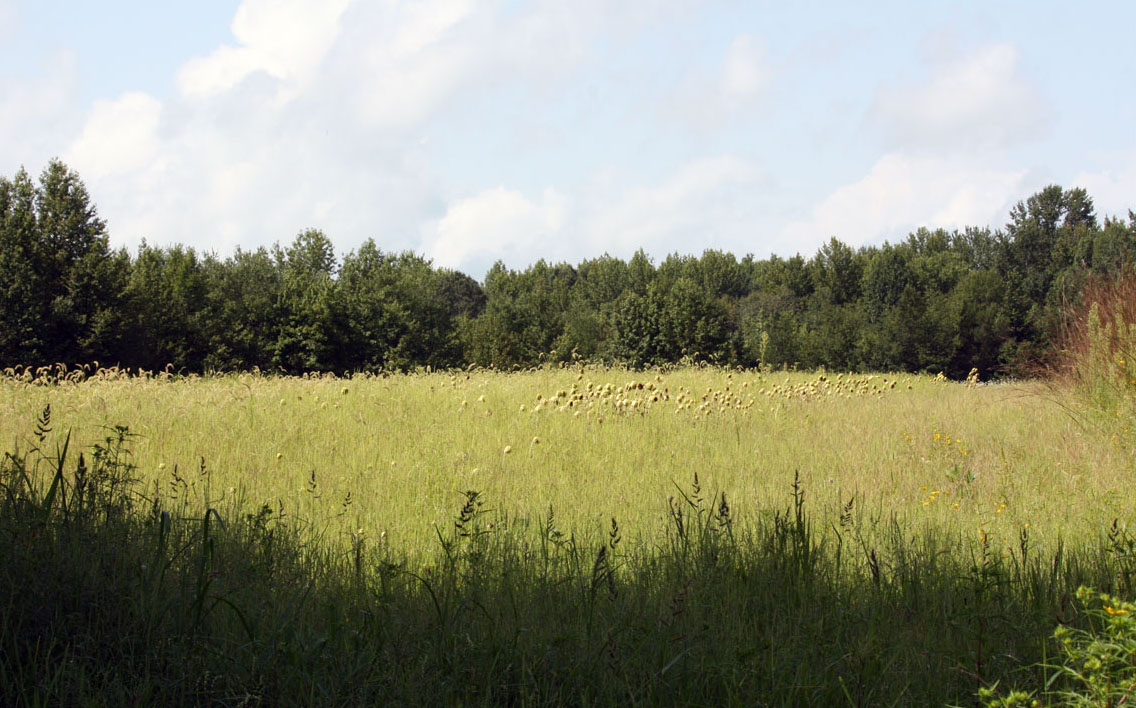
- View of an open field at Millington WMA
- Interactive map of Millington WMA
- Location: Maryland
- Nearest city: Massey
- Coordinates: 39°17′04″N 75°45′41″W
- Area: 4,000 acres (16 km^{2})
- Website: dnr.maryland.gov/wildlife/Publiclands/eastern/millington.asp

Millington Wildlife Management Area is a 4,000-acre Wildlife Management Area in Kent County, Maryland. The area is ecologically diverse, featuring hardwood forests as well as various types of wetlands, fields, and meadows. Millington supports a large variety of wildlife, including, whitetail deer, turkeys, quail, rabbits, and waterfowl, as well as protecting a number of endangered plants and animals species. The site also provides outdoor recreation as well as hunting in all established seasons.
