= Strider Wildlife Management Area =

Protected area in Maryland, United States

Coordinates: 39°9′21″N 77°15′27″W

Strider Wildlife Management Area is a Wildlife Management Area in Montgomery County, Maryland.
