= Soldiers Delight Natural Environment Area =

Nature reserve and serpentine ecosystem in Baltimore County, Maryland, United States

Coordinates: 39°24′58″N 76°49′49″W

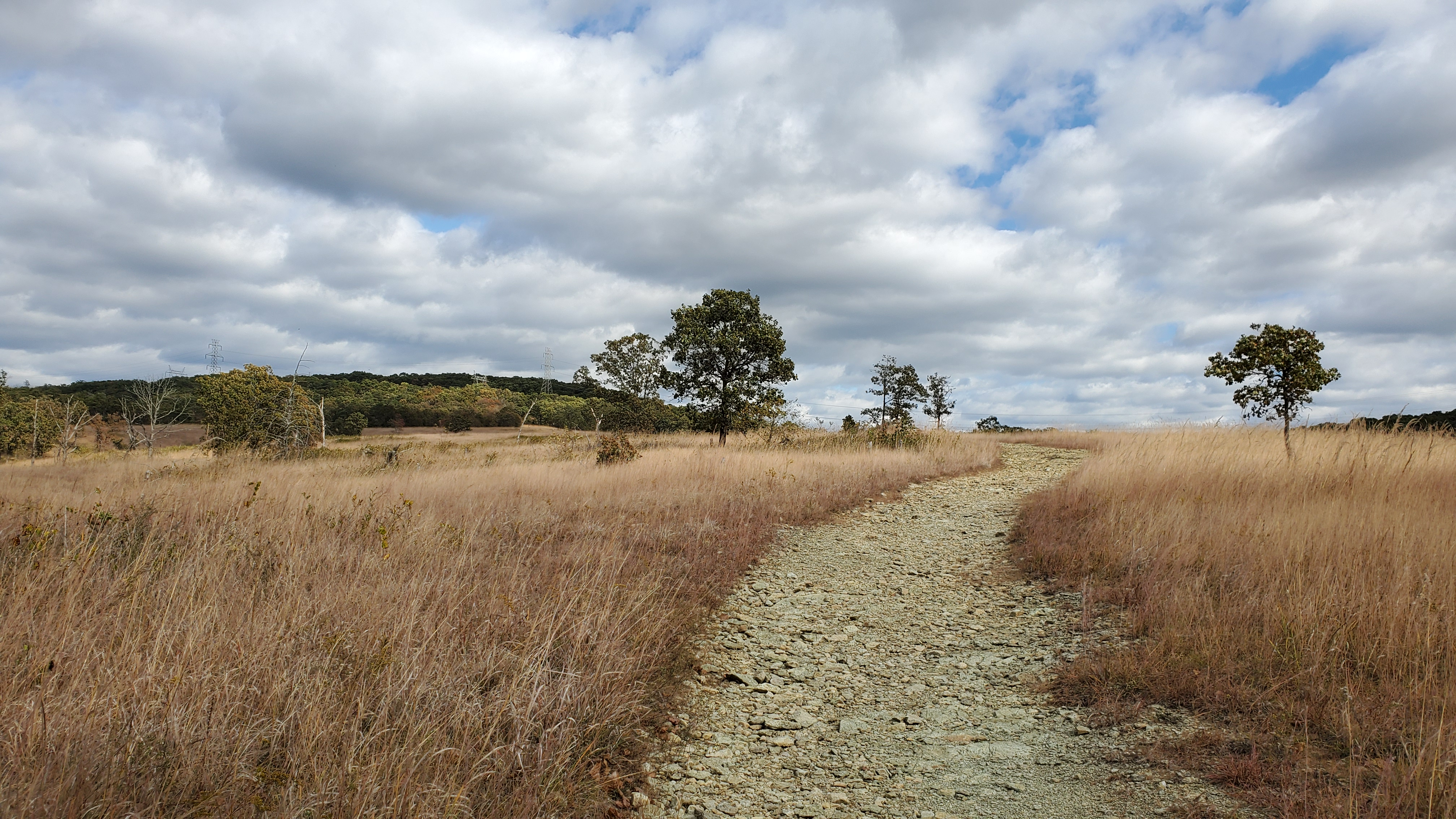
Soldiers Delight Natural Environmental Area

Soldiers Delight Natural Environmental Area is a nature reserve near Owings Mills in western Baltimore County, Maryland, U.S. The site is designated both as a Maryland Wildland (1,526 acres) and as a Natural Environment Area (1,900 acres) and is part of the Maryland Wildlands Preservation System. The site's protected status is due to the presence of serpentine soil and over 39 rare, threatened, or endangered plant species along with rare insects, rocks and minerals.

== Amenities ==
Seven miles (11 km) of hiking trails have been blazed at Soldier's Delight. While pets are permitted, equestrians and bicyclists are not, to protect the fragile terrain. A visitor center is open every day from 11am to 3pm. Attractions there include environmental education programs, live animals, and a letterboxing activity. Bowhunting is allowed from mid-November to the end of January with appropriate permits and a reservation.

== History ==
The early colonial records of Maryland describe the area as a hunting ground for Native Americans. In 1693, rangers in the King's service from a nearby garrison patrolled the area calling the land Soldiers Delight. In the 18th century, King George II made gifts of land grants upon Maryland's earliest settlers in what was then Soldiers Delight Hundred.

During the American Civil War, Soldiers Delight was the scene of minor short-term fights between the Maryland Volunteers of the Confederate Army and the regular troops of the Union Army. After the Civil War and the emancipation of people who were enslaved, the great estates of the early families were reduced to many small farms and individual properties.

== Geology and ecology ==
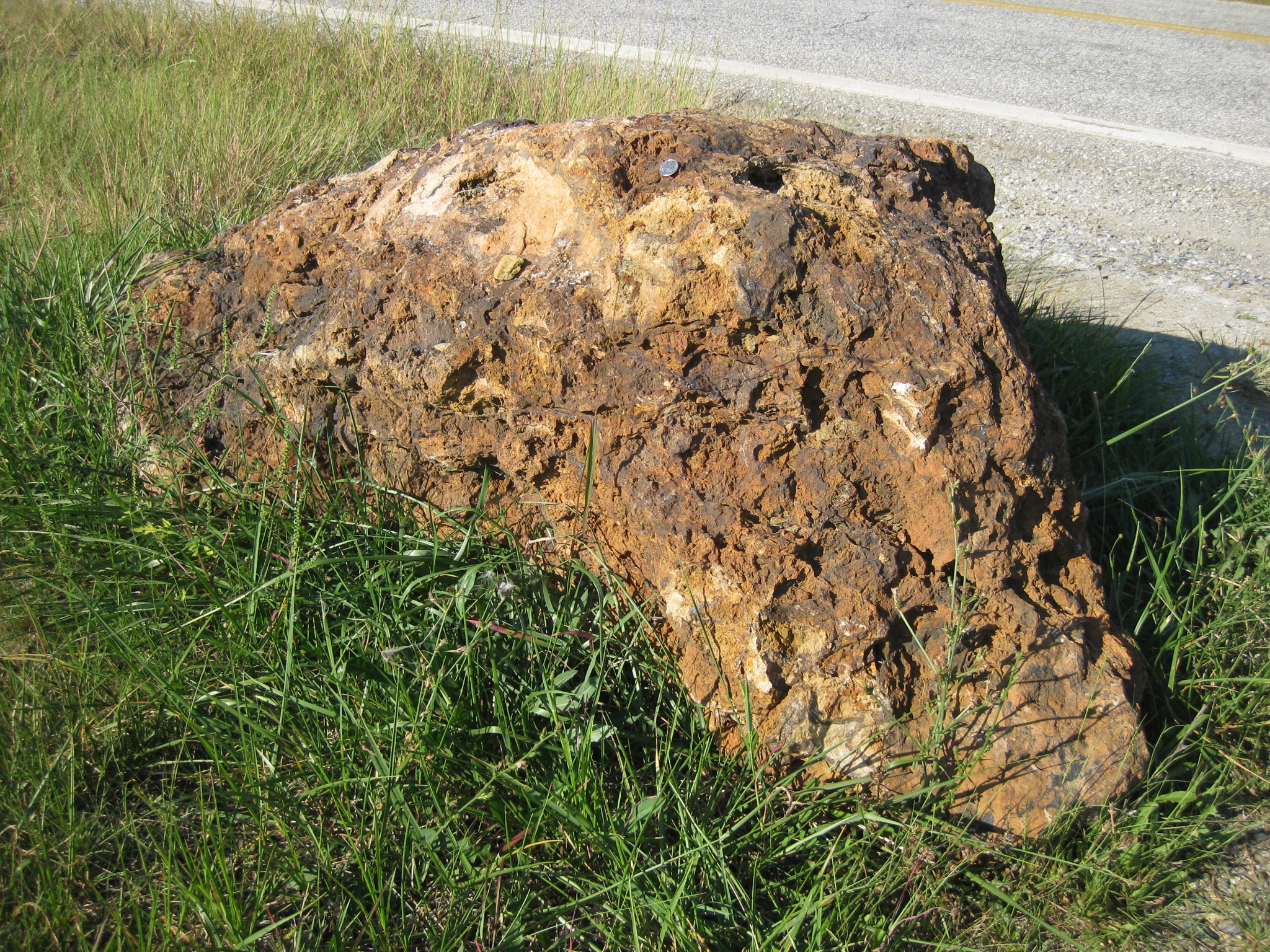
Boulder of serpentinite at Soldiers Delight Natural Environmental Area

The area is mostly underlaid by serpentinite, a rock that consists mainly of serpentine minerals, with very little quartz. These minerals are rich in aluminum, iron, magnesium, and chromium, but are low in plant nutrients such as calcium, phosphorus and potassium. Weathered serpentinite is dissolved rock, transformed into thin, sand- and clay-poor soils, and which is easily eroded. This creates a land surface which is stony, unfertile and sparsely vegetated, and thus are referred to as "serpentine barrens". Rather than closed-canopy forests typical of the region, these serpentine barrens are largely characterized by grasslands and savannas. Grasses, sedges, and forbs dominate, with several unique and rare wildflowers, such as serpentine aster (Symphyotrichum depauperatum), large field chickweed (Cerastium velutinum), quill fameflower (Phemeranthus teretifolius), and ten-lobe false foxglove (Agalinis decemloba). In savannas, trees that grow include bear oak (Quercus illicifolia) and eastern redcedar (Juniperus virginiana). Also prominent is blackjack oak (Quercus marilandica), which is more abundant at Soldiers Delight than in any other part of Maryland.Closed-canopy stands of Virginia pine (Pinus virginiana) surround the barrens, but threaten to encroach on the unique serpentine barren grassland and savanna ecosystem through successional afforestation due to past suppression of periodic controlled burns.

Serpentine is valued as a decorative building stone, road material, and for this area in Maryland, a historic source of chromium ore. Isaac Tyson, a 19th-century businessman from Baltimore, was one of the first to make the connection between the occurrence of chromite and serpentine barrens. He began mining chromite here in 1827. During the 19th century, Soldiers Delight and the Bare Hills district of Baltimore County were the largest producers of chrome in the world. In Maryland, chromite, a significant accessory mineral in the serpentine, was mined until 1860. Several old mines and quarries are still visible in these serpentine barrens.

== Soils ==
The most common soil is Chrome silt loam, which occupies well-drained areas over serpentinite. In more moist settings Chrome grades to Travilah silt loam. Areas where serpentinite influence is weak or absent are limited in Soldiers Delight, but are easily recognized by their more luxuriant vegetation on the upland Manor loam or the floodplain Hatboro silt loam.

== See also ==
- List of parks in the Baltimore–Washington metropolitan area
- State Line Serpentine Barrens
- Serpentine Ridge Nature Preserve
