= Manokin Historic District =

Historic district in Maryland, United States

- U.S. National Register of Historic Places
- U.S. Historic district
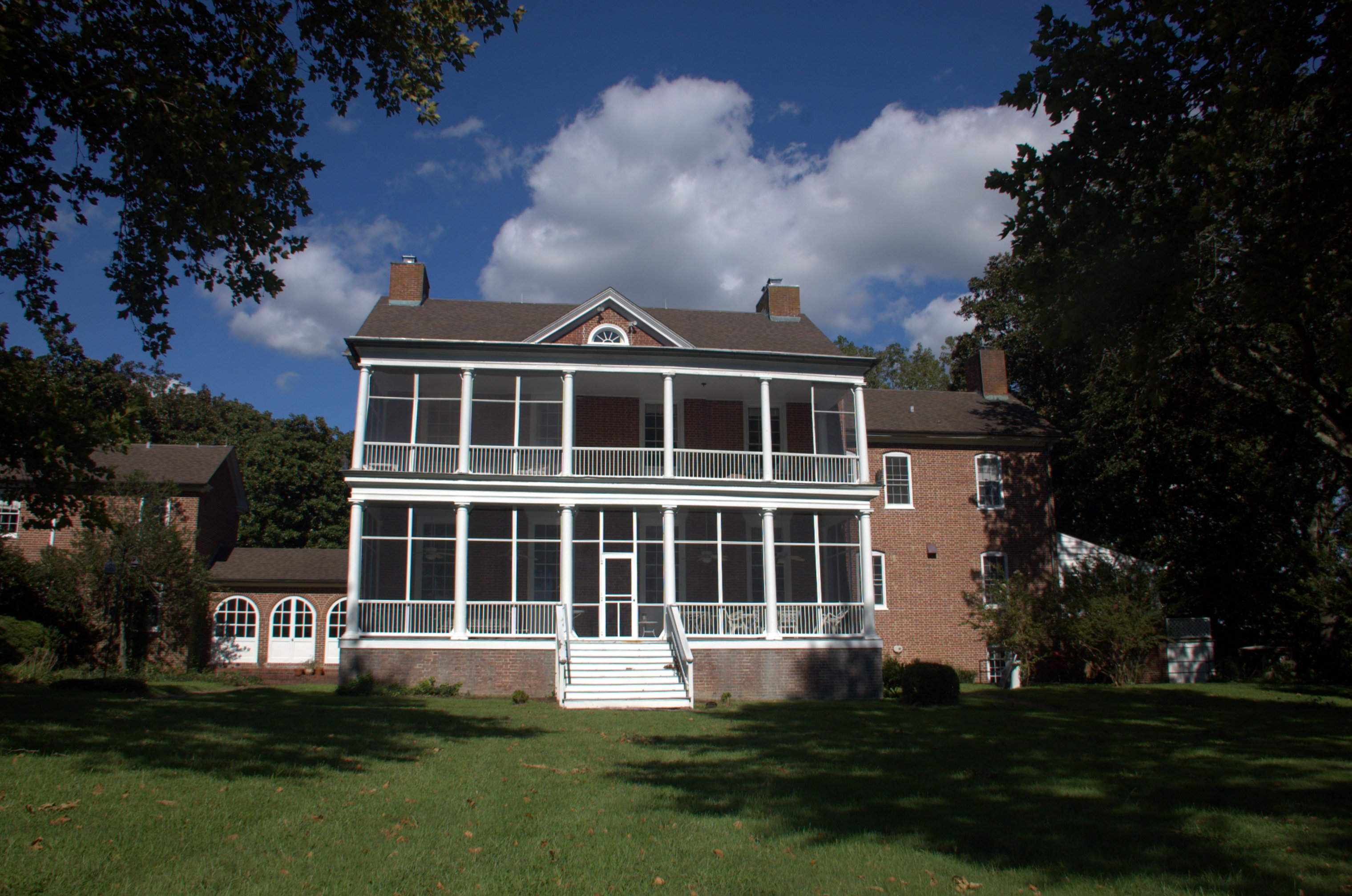
- Clifton (c. 1790)

- Location within Maryland Location within the United States
- Location: Southwest of Princess Anne at the Manokin River, Princess Anne, Maryland
- Coordinates: 38°9′16″N 75°47′22″W
- Area: 2,700 acres (1,100 ha)
- Architectural style: Georgian Revival
- NRHP reference No.: 76001010
- Added to NRHP: June 29, 1976

Manokin Historic District is a national historic district at Princess Anne, Somerset County, Maryland, United States, located at the mouth of the Manokin River. It consists of the Manokin settlement, which forms a unique and visually interesting area of great historical significance on the Lower Eastern Shore. These structures, Clifton, More and Case It, Almodington, Elmwood, and Homewood are most strongly linked together visually, culturally, and historically. Architecturally the buildings span the period between the early 18th and the mid 20th centuries.

Historically the structures are united by a tangled web of family interconnections. The continuous use of the properties for agriculture adds to the continuity of the intertwined historic associations. The vista from the district to the Chesapeake Bay or from the mouth of the Manokin River upstream remains unchanged from the 17th century.

The historic district was added to the National Register of Historic Places in 1976.
