= Islands of the Potomac Wildlife Management Area =

Protected area in Maryland, United States

- Location within Maryland
- Location: Montgomery, Garrett, Allegany, Frederick, Maryland, United States
- Coordinates: 39°15′56″N 77°31′52.5″W
- Operator: Maryland Department of Natural Resources
- Website: Islands of the Potomac WMA

The Islands of the Potomac Wildlife Management Area is a Wildlife Management Area (WMA) consisting of 30 islands in the Potomac River in Maryland along its border with the state of Virginia. It is administered by the Maryland Department of Natural Resources.

Islands of the Potomac WMA protects 824 acres (3.33 km^{2}) of wildlife habitat in Allegany (80 acres [0.32 km^{2}]), Washington (6 acres [0.024 km^{2}]), Frederick (223 acres [0.90 km^{2}]) and Montgomery (515 acres [2.08 km^{2}]) counties. The islands are accessible only by boat. Within the WMA is established the Islands of the Potomac Wildland (see Maryland Wildland), consisting of about 82% (676 acres [2.74 km^{2}]) of the total area.

Three of the islands (all in Montgomery County) are open to public hunting: Oxley Island, Mason Island and Maddox Island.

== See also ==
- Heater's Island Wildlife Management Area, also a Potomac island
