= Battle of Kedges Strait =

- Part of the American Revolutionary War
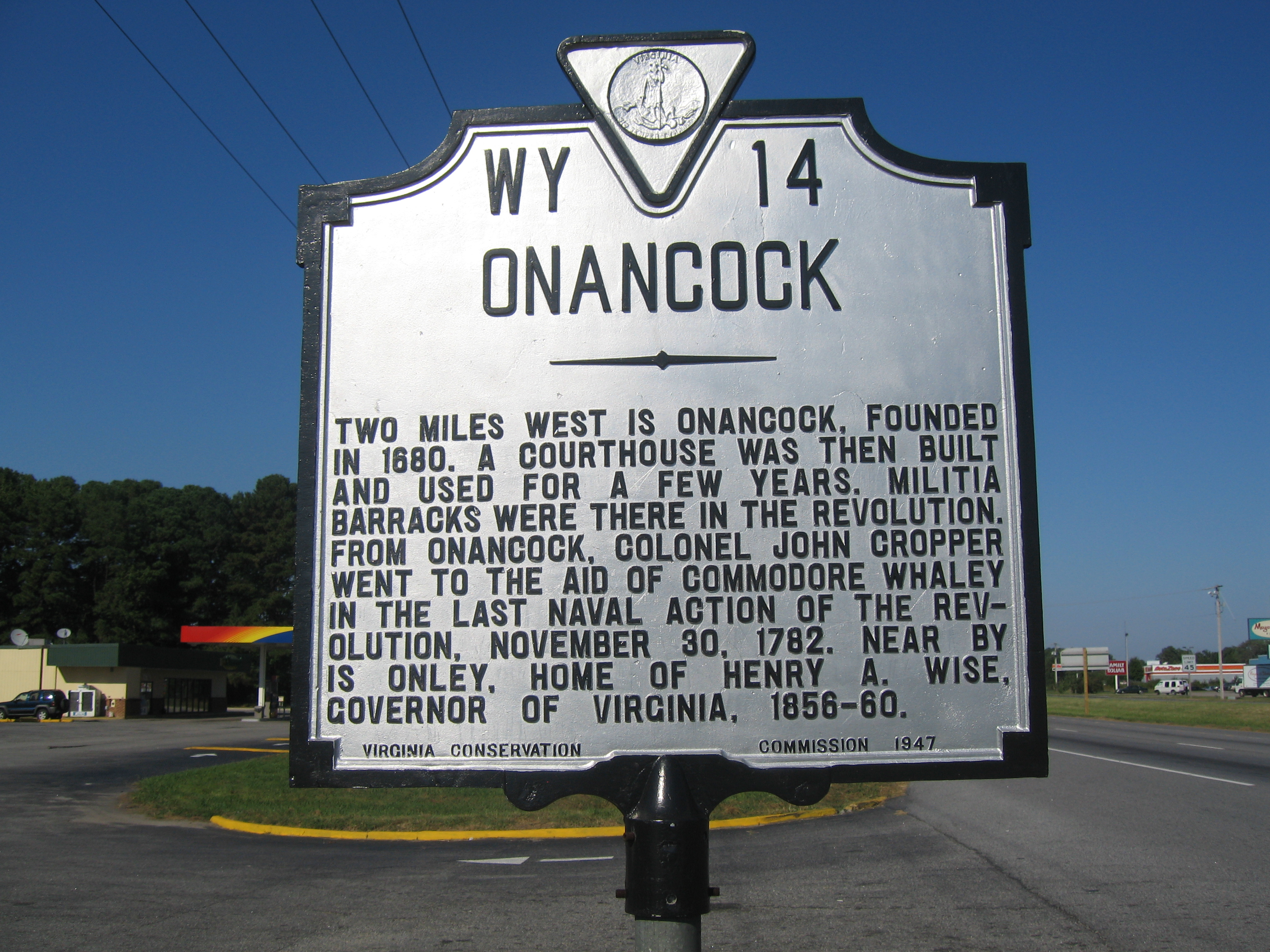
- Historic marker in Onancock, Virginia with outline of battle
Date	November 30, 1782
Location	Kedges Strait, Chesapeake Bay, between Smith and South Marsh Islands off Tangier Sound 37.995°N 75.955°W
Result	British victory

Belligerents
United States	Great Britain

Commanders and leaders
Commodore Zedechiah Whaley; Lt. Colonel John Cropper	(Kingdom of Great Britain) Unknown

Strength
65	Unknown

Casualties and losses
McDougall: 25 killed or wounded 29 captured 11 escaped	Unknown

The Battle of Kedges Strait (also known as the Battle of the Barges) took place on November 30, 1782 near Tangier Sound in the Chesapeake Bay near the town of Onancock, Virginia, between naval militia forces of the rebellious British colony of Maryland and the Royal Navy of Great Britain.

== The action ==
Some thirteen months had passed since General Charles Cornwallis' October 1781 surrender at Yorktown ending the land war between Great Britain and the Colonies. Intermittent conflict at sea, however, continued.

For two days in late November of 1782 Commodore Zedechiah Whaley of the Maryland militia had been waging an indecisive battle during a campaign against British barges of war that had been harassing the shores and farms of the Chesapeake Bay. Desperate for a victory, he sought aid from the Virginia peninsular town of Onancock, sailing Onancock Creek on November 28, 1782, and appealing to Lt. Colonel John Cropper. Cropper rounded up 25 local men in support, who boarded Whaley's flagship, Protector, and continued his siege upon the British flotilla.

Three of four of Whaley's barges turned back under heavy British fire, leaving the Protector alone to press the fight against six British craft. Vastly outnumbered, its crew suffered heavy losses during a climactic action on November 30 in Kedges Strait among Smith and South Marsh islands in Maryland and Tangier Island in Virginia off of Tangier Sound. Twenty-five of its 65 men were killed or wounded, 29 captured, and only 11 escaped. Whaley's surrender ended the last naval action of the Revolution.

== Legacy ==
The battle of Kedges Strait remains the subject of both academic research and limited guided tours. In 2016 the Captain John Smoot Chapter of the Maryland Society Sons of the American Revolution conducted a boat tour of the battle area, and the Maryland Maritime Archeology Program presented a lecture in 2017.

== See also ==
- Battle of Valcour Island - a conflict of barges of war on Lake Champlain that yielded cannons vital to the Colonial cause at the Battle of Bunker Hill
