= List of United States Supreme Court cases, volume 153 =

Supreme Court of the United States
- Interactive map of Supreme Court of the United States
- 38°53′26″N 77°00′16″W
- Established: March 4, 1789; 237 years ago
- Location: Washington, D.C.
- Coordinates: 38°53′26″N 77°00′16″W
- Composition method: Presidential nomination with Senate confirmation
- Authorised by: Constitution of the United States, Art. III, § 1
- Judge term length: life tenure, subject to impeachment and removal
- Number of positions: 9 (by statute)
- Website: supremecourt.gov

This is a list of cases reported in volume 153 of United States Reports, decided by the Supreme Court of the United States in 1894.

== Justices of the Supreme Court at the time of volume 153 U.S. ==
The Supreme Court is established by Article III, Section 1 of the Constitution of the United States, which says: "The judicial Power of the United States, shall be vested in one supreme Court . . .". The size of the Court is not specified; the Constitution leaves it to Congress to set the number of justices. Under the Judiciary Act of 1789 Congress originally fixed the number of justices at six (one chief justice and five associate justices). Since 1789 Congress has varied the size of the Court from six to seven, nine, ten, and back to nine justices (always including one chief justice).

When the cases in volume 153 U.S. were decided the Court comprised the following nine members:

Portrait	Justice	Office	Home State	Succeeded	Date confirmed by the Senate (Vote)	Tenure on Supreme Court
	Melville Fuller	Chief Justice	Illinois	Morrison Waite	July 20, 1888 (41–20)	October 8, 1888 – July 4, 1910 (Died)
	Stephen Johnson Field	Associate Justice	California	newly created seat	March 10, 1863 (Acclamation)	May 10, 1863 – December 1, 1897 (Retired)
	John Marshall Harlan	Associate Justice	Kentucky	David Davis	November 29, 1877 (Acclamation)	December 10, 1877 – October 14, 1911 (Died)
	Horace Gray	Associate Justice	Massachusetts	Nathan Clifford	December 20, 1881 (51–5)	January 9, 1882 – September 15, 1902 (Died)
	David Josiah Brewer	Associate Justice	Kansas	Stanley Matthews	December 18, 1889 (53–11)	January 6, 1890 – March 28, 1910 (Died)
	Henry Billings Brown	Associate Justice	Michigan	Samuel Freeman Miller	December 29, 1890 (Acclamation)	January 5, 1891 – May 28, 1906 (Retired)
	George Shiras Jr.	Associate Justice	Pennsylvania	Joseph P. Bradley	July 26, 1892 (Acclamation)	October 10, 1892 – February 23, 1903 (Retired)
	Howell Edmunds Jackson	Associate Justice	Tennessee	Lucius Quintus Cincinnatus Lamar	February 18, 1893 (Acclamation)	March 4, 1893 – August 8, 1895 (Died)
	Edward Douglass White	Associate Justice	Louisiana	Samuel Blatchford	February 19, 1894 (Acclamation)	March 12, 1894 – December 18, 1910 (Continued as chief justice)

== Citation style ==
Under the Judiciary Act of 1789 the federal court structure at the time comprised District Courts, which had general trial jurisdiction; Circuit Courts, which had mixed trial and appellate (from the US District Courts) jurisdiction; and the United States Supreme Court, which had appellate jurisdiction over the federal District and Circuit courts—and for certain issues over state courts. The Supreme Court also had limited original jurisdiction (i.e., in which cases could be filed directly with the Supreme Court without first having been heard by a lower federal or state court). There were one or more federal District Courts and/or Circuit Courts in each state, territory, or other geographical region.

The Judiciary Act of 1891 created the United States Courts of Appeals and reassigned the jurisdiction of most routine appeals from the district and circuit courts to these appellate courts. The Act created nine new courts that were originally known as the "United States Circuit Courts of Appeals." The new courts had jurisdiction over most appeals of lower court decisions. The Supreme Court could review either legal issues that a court of appeals certified or decisions of court of appeals by writ of certiorari.

Bluebook citation style is used for case names, citations, and jurisdictions.

- "# Cir." = United States Court of Appeals
  - e.g., "3d Cir." = United States Court of Appeals for the Third Circuit
- "C.C.D." = United States Circuit Court for the District of . . .
  - e.g.,"C.C.D.N.J." = United States Circuit Court for the District of New Jersey
- "D." = United States District Court for the District of . . .
  - e.g.,"D. Mass." = United States District Court for the District of Massachusetts
- "E." = Eastern; "M." = Middle; "N." = Northern; "S." = Southern; "W." = Western
  - e.g.,"C.C.S.D.N.Y." = United States Circuit Court for the Southern District of New York
  - e.g.,"M.D. Ala." = United States District Court for the Middle District of Alabama
- "Ct. Cl." = United States Court of Claims
- The abbreviation of a state's name alone indicates the highest appellate court in that state's judiciary at the time.
  - e.g.,"Pa." = Supreme Court of Pennsylvania
  - e.g.,"Me." = Supreme Judicial Court of Maine

== List of cases in volume 153 U.S. ==
Case Name	Page & year	Opinion of the Court	Concurring opinion(s)	Dissenting opinion(s)	Lower Court	Disposition
Lowndes v. Town of Huntington	1 (1894)	Brewer	none	none	C.C.E.D.N.Y.	affirmed
Seeberger v. Castro	32 (1894)	White	none	none	C.C.N.D. Ill.	affirmed
Spalding v. Castro	38 (1894)	White	none	none	C.C.N.D. Ill.	affirmed
Wilson v. Haley L.S. Co.	39 (1894)	Brown	none	none	C.C.D. Colo.	reversed
United States v. Pridgeon	48 (1894)	Jackson	none	none	6th Cir.	certification
The Martello	64 (1894)	Brown	none	none	C.C.S.D.N.Y.	reversed
West v. Cabell	78 (1894)	Gray	none	none	C.C.N.D. Tex.	reversed
United States v. Shields	88 (1894)	Jackson	none	none	Ct. Cl.	reversed
United States v. Klingenberg	93 (1894)	Jackson	none	none	C.C.S.D.N.Y.	reversed
Lutz v. Magone	105 (1894)	Brown	none	none	C.C.S.D.N.Y.	affirmed
Hegler v. Faulkner	109 (1894)	Shiras	none	none	C.C.D. Neb.	affirmed
Morgan v. Daniels	120 (1894)	Brewer	none	none	C.C.D. Mass.	reversed
The Britannia	130 (1894)	Shiras	none	Brown	C.C.S.D.N.Y.	reversed
Wharton v. Wise	155 (1894)	Field	none	none	C.C.E.D. Va.	affirmed
Erhardt v. Steinhardt	177 (1894)	Fuller	none	none	C.C.S.D.N.Y.	affirmed
Gourko v. United States	183 (1894)	Harlan	none	none	C.C.W.D. Ark.	reversed
Hanrick v. Hanrick	192 (1894)	Gray	none	none	C.C.N.D. Tex.	reversed
The Edwin I. Morrison	199 (1894)	Fuller	none	none	C.C.S.D.N.Y.	reversed
Runkle v. Burnham	216 (1894)	White	none	none	C.C.D.N.J.	affirmed
Burke v. Dulaney	228 (1894)	Harlan	none	none	Sup. Ct. Terr. Idaho	reversed
California v. Southern P.R.R. Co.	239 (1894)	per curiam	none	none	original	procedural orders
In re City Nat'l Bank	246 (1894)	Fuller	none	none	C.C.N.D. Tex.	mandamus denied
Northern P.R.R. Co. v. Clark	252 (1894)	Jackson	none	none	8th Cir.	certification
Mann v. Tacoma Land Co.	273 (1894)	Brewer	none	none	C.C.D. Wash.	affirmed
Baer v. Moran Bros. Co.	287 (1894)	Brewer	none	none	Wash.	affirmed
Brennan v. City of Titusville	289 (1894)	Brewer	none	none	Pa.	reversed
Blitz v. United States	308 (1894)	Harlan	none	none	W.D. Mo.	multiple
McBroom v. Scottish M. & L. Inv. Co.	318 (1894)	Harlan	none	none	Sup. Ct. Terr. N.M.	affirmed
Gates I.W. v. Fraser	332 (1894)	Shiras	none	none	C.C.N.D. Ill.	affirmed
South Carolina v. Seymour	353 (1894)	Gray	none	none	D.C. Ct. App.	dismissed
Mason v. Pewabic M. Co.	361 (1894)	Fuller	none	none	C.C.W.D. Mich.	dismissed
Roberts v. Lewis	367 (1894)	Gray	none	none	8th Cir.	certification
Marchant v. Pennsylvania R.R. Co.	380 (1894)	Shiras	none	none	Philadelphia Cnty. Ct. Com. Pl.	affirmed
Brass v. North Dakota ex rel. Stoeser	391 (1894)	Shiras	none	Brewer	Ramsey Cnty. Dist. Ct.	affirmed
City of New Orleans v. Benjamin	411 (1894)	Fuller	none	none	5th Cir.	certification
Ashley v. Ryan	436 (1894)	White	none	none	Ohio	affirmed
Eagle Ins. Co. v. Ohio ex rel. Kinder	446 (1894)	White	none	none	Ohio	affirmed
Stewart v. Barnes	456 (1894)	Shiras	none	none	C.C.E.D. Pa.	affirmed
Groves v. Sentell	465 (1894)	White	none	none	C.C.E.D. La.	reversed
Mobile & O.R.R. Co. v. Tennessee	486 (1894)	Jackson	none	Fuller	Tenn.	reversed
Slide S.G. Mines v. Seymour	509 (1894)	Brewer	none	none	C.C.D. Colo.	affirmed
Seymour v. Slide S.G. Mines	523 (1894)	Brewer	none	none	C.C.D. Colo.	affirmed
Luxton v. North R.B. Co.	525 (1894)	Gray	none	none	C.C.D.N.J.	affirmed
Miller v. Texas	535 (1894)	Brown	none	none	Tex. Crim. App.	dismissed
Anvil M. Co. v. Humble	540 (1894)	Brewer	none	none	C.C.W.D. Mich.	affirmed
Chicago D.V. Co. v. McNulta	554 (1894)	Jackson	none	none	C.C.N.D. Ill.	affirmed
Loud v. Pomona L. & W. Co.	564 (1894)	Jackson	none	none	C.C.E.D. Mich.	affirmed
Evans v. United States I	584 (1894)	Brown	none	Field	E.D. Pa.	affirmed
Evans v. United States II	608 (1894)	Brown	none	Field	E.D. Pa.	affirmed
Seeberger v. Schweyer	609 (1894)	Shiras	none	none	C.C.N.D. Ill.	reversed
Starr v. United States	614 (1894)	Fuller	none	none	C.C.W.D. Ark.	reversed
New York et al. R.R. Co. v. Pennsylvania	628 (1894)	Harlan	none	none	Pa.	reversed
Lyons v. Woods	649 (1894)	Fuller	none	none	Sup. Ct. Terr. N.M.	affirmed
Metcalf v. City of Watertown	671 (1894)	Fuller	none	none	C.C.W.D. Wis.	reversed
McKane v. Durston	684 (1894)	Harlan	none	none	C.C.S.D.N.Y.	affirmed
Connecticut ex rel. New York et al. Co. v. Woodruff	689 (1894)	Fuller	none	none	Conn.	dismissed
Postal T.C. Co v. City of Charleston	692 (1894)	Shiras	none	none	C.C.D.S.C.	affirmed
