= Earleville Wildlife Management Area =

Wildlife Management Area in Maryland, US

- Location within Maryland
- Location: Cecil, Maryland, United States
- Coordinates: 39°26′58″N 75°54′46.5″W
- Operator: Maryland Department of Natural Resources
- Website: Earleville WMA

Earleville Wildlife Management Area is a Wildlife Management Area in Cecil County, Maryland. The area is managed as a hunting area for upland game.
