= Parkers Marsh Natural Area Preserve =

Protected area in Virginia, United States

- Sound Beach or Ware Point
- Location within Virginia Location within the United States
- Location: Accomack County, Virginia
- Nearest city: Onancock
- Coordinates: 37°44′21″N 75°49′05″W
- Area: 759 acres (307 ha)
- Governing body: Virginia Department of Conservation and Recreation

Parkers Marsh Natural Area Preserve, known locally as Sound Beach or Ware Point, is a 759-acre (307 ha) Natural Area Preserve located in Accomack County, Virginia to the Northwest of the Town of Onancock (4.5 miles by boat) at the mouth of Onancock Creek and the Chesapeake Bay. The preserve incorporates beach habitat along the Chesapeake Bay and Onancock Creek, as well as low marsh, high marsh, maritime shrubland communities, and maritime forest. Various plant, animal, insect, and other species are present throughout the year. About 75% of the site is salt marsh. One rare species within the preserve is the Sharp-tailed Sparrow (Ammodramus caudacutus). A Peregrine falcon pair has been successfully nested there since 1998.

Along with the Tiger Beetles using the beach area of Parkers Marsh, Diamondback terrapins (Malaclemys terrapin) nest along the shore. Terrapins are sometimes confused for being sea turtles when seen in the waters of the bay and have population problems like that of the sea turtle. A significant threat is that they can become entrapped in crab pots and drowned. Like all other turtles, they can not hold their breath indefinitely.

The preserve has been designated an Important Bird Area (IBA) by the National Audubon Society as a part of the "Delmarva Bayside Marshes IBA", which also includes the nearby Mark's and Jack's Island Natural Area Preserve and Saxis Wildlife Management Area.

The Virginia Department of Conservation and Recreation Natural Heritage Program owns and maintains Parkers Marsh Natural Area Preserve. This preserve is accessible only by boat and does not include improvements such as docks. Visitors must contact the Coastal Region Steward before visiting. For anyone interested in conducting research on Parkers Marsh or any other state preserves must submit a research permit application (FORMS 4VAC5-30).

All state laws in Virginia State Parks also apply in all of Virginia's Natural Area Preserves. The Department of Conservation and Recreation manages Virginia State Parks and the Natural Heritage Program. Law Enforcement Rangers with both the State Parks and Natural Heritage Program routinely patrol these areas, along with DWR and VMRC officers. All DCR Rangers have statewide jurisdiction.

== See also ==
- Chesapeake Bay Foundation
- List of Virginia Natural Area Preserves
- Virginia Department of Conservation and Recreation
- Virginia Department of Wildlife Resources
- Virginia Marine Resources Commission
