= Ellis Bay Wildlife Management Area =

State Wildlife Management Area in Wicomico County, Maryland

- IUCN category V (protected landscape/seascape)
- Location within Maryland
- Location: Wicomico, Maryland, United States
- Coordinates: 38°15′47″N 75°51′23″W
- Area: 3,200 acres (13 km^{2})
- Established: 1957
- Operator: Maryland Department of Natural Resources
- Website: Ellis Bay WMA

Ellis Bay Wildlife Management Area is a Wildlife Management Area in Wicomico County, Maryland. The area borders the Chesapeake Bay and is mainly wetland, both open and forested.
