= Chicamuxen Wildlife Management Area =

State Wildlife Management Area in Maryland, US

- Location within Maryland
- Location: Charles, Maryland, United States
- Coordinates: 38°32′32″N 77°13′25″W
- Area: 381 acres (154 ha)
- Operator: Maryland Department of Natural Resources
- Website: Chicamuxen WMA

Chicamuxen Wildlife Management Area is a state Wildlife Management Area along Chickamuxen Creek near the Potomac River in Charles County, Maryland. The area includes a variety of landforms from marshland to rolling forest. The area provides duck and white-tailed deer habitat. The area was the location of an encampment for General Joseph Hooker's troops during the American Civil War.
