= Indian Springs Wildlife Management Area =

Protected area in Maryland, United States

- Location within Maryland
- Location: Washington, Maryland, United States
- Coordinates: 39°42′21″N 77°59′49″W
- Area: 6,400 acres (26 km^{2})
- Operator: Maryland Department of Natural Resources
- Website: Indian Springs WMA

Indian Springs Wildlife Management Area is a Wildlife Management Area in Washington County, Maryland near Clear Spring. The 6,400-acre (2,600 ha) tract is in wooded mountainous terrain.
