= Baltimore Chrome Works =

Chromium ore refinery in Baltimore, USA

Coordinates: 39°16.8′N 76°36′W

Baltimore Chrome Works was a chromium ore refinery with its headquarters and main factory located at Fells Point, Baltimore, USA. Isaac Tyson started mining chromite in the area around Baltimore in 1813 and built the Baltimore Chrome Works at Fells Point in 1845. The works became part of Mutual Chemical Company in 1908, and merged into Allied Chemical in 1954. The plant, which was rebuilt in 1951, employed 375 people at peak production.

The factory at Fells Point operated until 1985, when it was closed down. The company had contaminated the 20 acres (81,000 m^{2}) site with hazardous waste, and Honeywell, the successor to Allied Chemical, was ordered by the Environmental Protection Agency to perform a cleanup in the 1986. The order was confirmed by a judicial consent decree in 1989. Honeywell completed the remediation in 1999.
