= Linkwood Wildlife Management Area =

Protected area in Maryland, United States

Coordinates: 38°32′12″N 75°55′20″W

Linkwood Wildlife Management Area is a 313-acre (1.27 km^{2}) Wildlife Management Area located in Dorchester County, Maryland, near the town of Linkwood.
