= Mark's and Jack's Island Natural Area Preserve =

Protected area in Virginia, United States

- Location within Virginia Location within the United States
- Location: Accomack County, Virginia
- Coordinates: 37°49′04″N 75°42′16″W
- Area: 2,305 acres (9.33 km^{2})
- Owner: The Nature Conservancy

Mark's and Jack's Island Natural Area Preserve is a 2,305-acre (9.33 km^{2}) Natural Area Preserve located in Accomack County, Virginia. The preserve supports Chesapeake Bay beach habitat, as well as various types of marsh, shrub, and forest vegetation. Many species of birds can be found in the preserve's wetlands, and numerous plant species live in the marsh, including marsh-elder. Loblolly pine and black cherry may be seen along the tops of some old dunes. The beaches provide a home for the northeastern beach tiger beetle.

The preserve has been designated an Important Bird Area (IBA) by the National Audubon Society as a part of the "Delmarva Bayside Marshes IBA", which also includes the nearby Parkers Marsh Natural Area Preserve and Saxis Wildlife Management Area.

The preserve is owned and maintained by The Nature Conservancy. Access to the preserve is possible only by boat, and is restricted to educational or research purposes. Visitors must make arrangements with The Nature Conservancy prior to visiting.

== See also ==
- List of Virginia Natural Area Preserves
