= Hugg-Thomas Wildlife Management Area =

Wildlife Management Area in Maryland

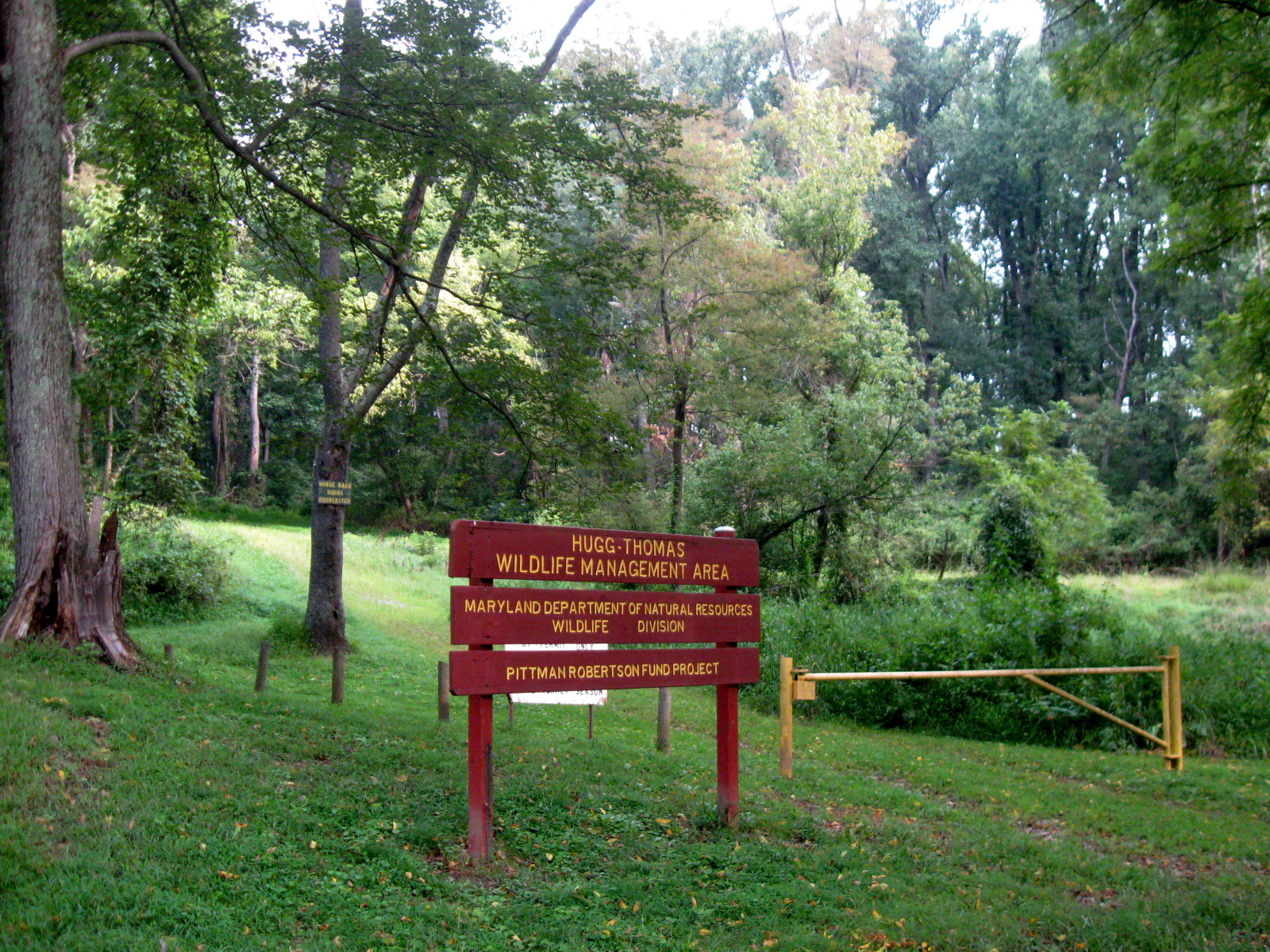
- Entrance to the property from Forsythe Road

- Location within Maryland
- Location: Howard, Carroll, Maryland, United States
- Coordinates: 39°21′32″N 76°58′38″W
- Operator: Maryland Department of Natural Resources
- Website: Hugg-Thomas WMA

Hugg-Thomas Wildlife Management Area is a Wildlife Management Area in Howard County, Maryland, south of the town of Sykesville. The area comprises two parcels totaling 275 acres (111 ha). The Carroll County portion includes the estate of Admiral Jacob Hugg, including the ruins of the Hugg mansion.
