= Nassawango Creek =

Largest tributary of the Pocomoke River in Maryland, USA

Location
- Country: United States
- State: Maryland
- Area: Delmarva Peninsula
- Counties: Wicomico County; Worcester County

Physical characteristics
- Source
  - location: Wicomico County, Maryland
- Mouth: Pocomoke River
  - location: Below Snow Hill, Maryland
  - coordinates: 38.160°N 75.423°W
- Length: 20.8 mi (33.5 km)

Nassawango Creek (locally /næsəˈwɒŋɡoʊ/ or /næsəˈwæŋɡoʊ/) is a stream in the U.S. state of Maryland; it is the largest tributary of the Pocomoke River, located on the Delmarva Peninsula. Older variations on the same name include Nassanongo, Naseongo, Nassiongo, and Nassiungo, meaning "[ground] between [the streams]". Early English records have it as Askimenokonson Creek, after a Native settlement near its headwaters (askimenokonson roughly approximating a local Algonquian word meaning "stony place where they pick early [straw]berries").

The Nassawango rises in Wicomico County, Maryland and flows 20.8 miles (33.5 km) through Worcester County to join the Pocomoke below Snow Hill. Large portions of its drainage lie within the Pocomoke River State Forest and The Nature Conservancy's Nassawango Creek Preserve. Nassawango Creek and its tributaries were once dammed in several places for mills; one dam site, became an early industrial blast furnace operation, where bog iron ore was smelted to make pig iron at Furnacetown during the first half of the 19th century. Today, the furnace grounds are considered a local historical landmark.
