= Heater's Island Wildlife Management Area =

Protected area in Maryland, United States

- Location within Maryland
- Location: Frederick, Maryland, United States
- Coordinates: 39°15′56″N 77°31′52.5″W
- Established: 1972
- Operator: Maryland Department of Natural Resources
- Website: Heater's Island WMA

Heater's Island Wildlife Management Area is a Wildlife Management Area in Frederick County, Maryland. Heater's Island is a large forested island in the Potomac River near Point of Rocks, Maryland. It was long inhabited by the Piscataway people, who were forced to leave by smallpox in 1705.

== See also ==
- Islands of the Potomac Wildlife Management Area
