= Wellington Wildlife Management Area =

Protected area in Maryland, US

Coordinates: 38°9′10″N 75°37′27″W

Wellington Wildlife Management Area is a Wildlife Management Area in Somerset County, Maryland.
