= Prather's Neck Wildlife Management Area =

Protected areas in Maryland, United States

Powell Marsh Wildlife Area
- IUCN category V (protected landscape/seascape)
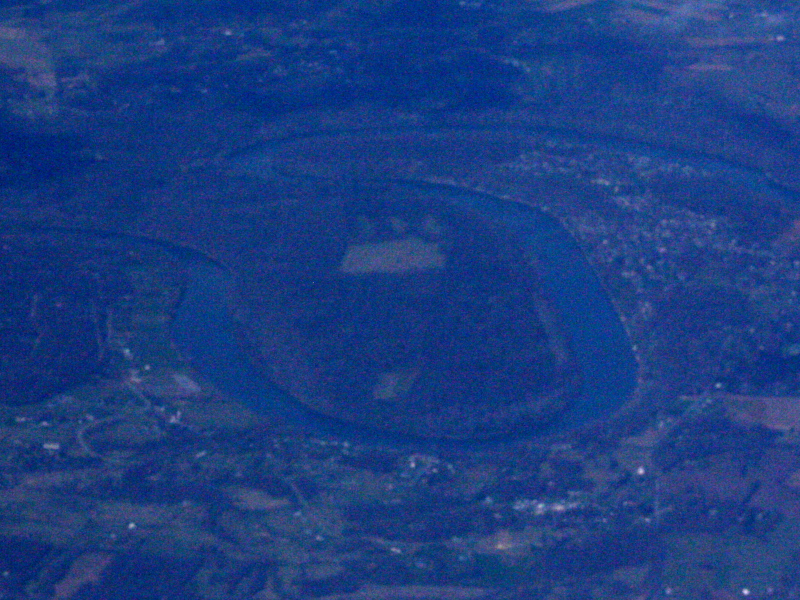
- Oblique view looking north of Prather's Neck Wildlife Management Area

- Location within Maryland Location within the United States
- Location: Washington County, Maryland
- Nearest city: Hagerstown, MD
- Coordinates: 39.59517181554317°N 77.94281619908536°W
- Area: 215 acres (87 ha)
- Established: 2007
- Governing body: Maryland Department of Natural Resources

Prather's Neck Wildlife Management Area is a Wildlife Management Area in Washington County, Maryland. The majority of it lies on the southern tip of Prather's Neck, a peninsula of land formed by a meander of the Potomac River. A small portion reserved for archery hunting lies north of the main area. The Prather's Neck Trail allows access to the area.
