= Gwynnbrook Wildlife Management Area =

Wildlife Management Area

- Location within Maryland
- Location: Baltimore, Maryland, United States
- Coordinates: 39°26′47″N 76°46′40″W
- Area: 88 acres (36 ha)
- Established: 1919
- Operator: Maryland Department of Natural Resources
- Website: Gwynnbrook WMA

Gwynnbrook Wildlife Management Area is an 88-acre (36 ha) Wildlife Management Area in Owings Mills, Baltimore County, Maryland. The property is a former game farm that was purchased by Maryland in 1919, and is the oldest WMA in the state.
