= Le Compte Wildlife Management Area =

Protected area in Maryland, United States

Coordinates: 38°27′39″N 75°53′7″W

Le Compte Wildlife Management Area is a Wildlife Management Area in Dorchester County, Maryland.
