= Bowen Wildlife Management Area =

State Wildlife Management Area in Prince George's County, Maryland

- IUCN category V (protected landscape/seascape)
- Location within Maryland
- Location: Prince George's, Maryland, United States
- Coordinates: 38.607°N 76.677°W
- Area: 300 acres (120 ha)
- Established: 1955
- Operator: Maryland Department of Natural Resources
- Website: Bowen WMA

Bowen Wildlife Management Area is a Wildlife Management Area in Prince George's County, Maryland. It was deeded by Harry L. Bowen to the state of Maryland in 1955 for $1.00. The area is 80 percent water-covered and is a popular site for waterfowl hunting and canoeing.
