= Johnson Wildlife Management Area =

Protected area in Maryland, United States

Coordinates: 38°18′16″N 75°30′0″W

Johnson Wildlife Management Area is a Wildlife Management Area in Wicomico County, Maryland.
