= Nanticoke River Wildlife Management Area =

Protected area in Maryland, United States

Coordinates: 38°22′50″N 75°49′20″W

Nanticoke River Wildlife Management Area is a Wildlife Management Area in Wicomico County, Maryland, near Quantico, Maryland.
