= Warrior Mountain Wildlife Management Area =

Wildlife Management Area in Maryland, US

Coordinates: 39°35′40″N 78°38′20″W

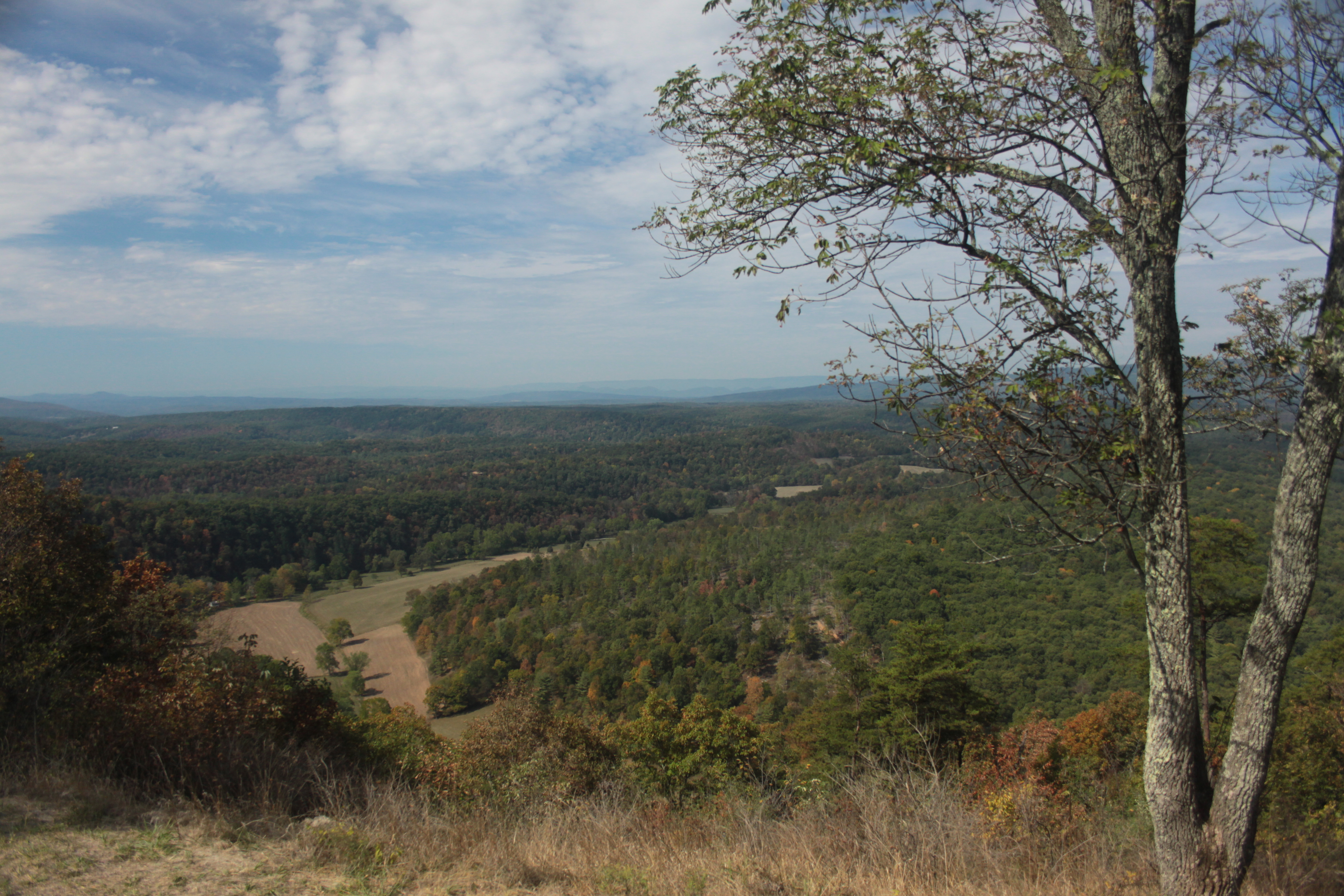
Warrior Mountain Wildlife Management Area

Warrior Mountain Wildlife Management Area is a Wildlife Management Area in Oldtown, Allegany County, Maryland.
