= Pocomoke State Forest =

Protected area in Maryland, United States

Coordinates: 38°7′58″N 75°25′58″W

Pocomoke State Forest, Maryland, United States
- Interactive map of Pocomoke State Forest, Maryland, United States
- Location: Maryland
- Nearest city: Salisbury
- Area: Eastern Shore of Maryland
- Governing body: Maryland Department of Natural Resources

Pocomoke State Forest is a state forest of Maryland that lies on both banks of the Pocomoke River in Worcester County. The portion north of the Pocomoke lies between Dividing and Nassawango Creeks. The Pocomoke River Wildlife Management Area borders the southern portion of the forest.

With 17,676 acres (71.53 km^{2}) wooded between Snow Hill and Pocomoke City, the state forest is famous for its stands of loblolly pine and for its cypress swamps, which border the Pocomoke River. The river originates in the Great Cypress Swamp in Delaware and flows southwesterly 45 miles (72 km) to the Chesapeake Bay.

Five areas in the forest, including the swamp, are designated wildlands areas. The forest's combination of swamp and upland offers a great variety of plant and animal life, including white dogwood and pink laurel in the spring, bald cypress, river otters, and bald eagles.

Before the establishment of the State Forest much of the land had been cleared for farming or used as farm woodlots. When the depression era hit many of the farmers fell on hard times, resulting in the acquisition of large amounts of land by the Federal Government.

In the mid to late 1930s, two Civilian Conservation Camps were located on the Forest. The camp workers did considerable road and trail work, established boundary lines, provided for fire protection and suppression, planted trees and performed recreation improvements at Milburn Landing. At this same time the State was purchasing lands for management activities.

Hunting in season is permitted in the state forest. Also within the forest is the Pocomoke River State Park, which has facilities for camping, boating, and hiking.
