= McKane v. Durston =

- Supreme Court of the United States

Decided May 14, 1894
- Full case name: John Y. McKane, Durston, Agent and Warden of Sing Sing Prison, of the State of New York
- Citations: 153 U.S. 684 (more) 14 S. Ct. 913; 38 L. Ed. 867

Case history
- Prior: On writ of certiorari to the Supreme Court of New York

Holding
- A defendant has no federally constitutionally guaranteed right to an appeal.

Court membership
- Chief Justice Melville Fuller Associate Justices Stephen J. Field · John M. Harlan; Horace Gray · David J. Brewer; Henry B. Brown · George Shiras Jr. Howell E. Jackson · Edward D. White

Case opinion
- Majority: Harlan, joined by unanimous

Laws applied
- US Constitution Article IV Section 2; In re Jugiro, 140 U.S. 291; Clawson v. United States, 113 U.S. 143; Code Cr. Proc. N. Y. § 555

McKane v. Durston, 153 U.S. 684 (1894), was a United States Supreme Court case in which the Court held that a criminal defendant has no federal constitutional right to an appeal. It held that states can grant appellate review at their discretion and on terms of their choice, but they have no obligation to.

== Background ==
According to the opinion, which provides a short history, John McKane was charged and convicted of violating "certain provisions of the law ... relating to elections and to the registration of voters." He was sentenced to six years of hard labor at Sing Sing prison, on February 19, 1894. The lawyer representing McKane then filed a petition for the writ of habeas corpus in the circuit court of the United States for the southern district of New York. The circuit court denied the appeal, so the Supreme Court asserted jurisdiction, citing that constitutional questions of the validity of the incarceration were present. McKane also asked for bail while his appeal was ongoing.

== Opinion of the Court ==
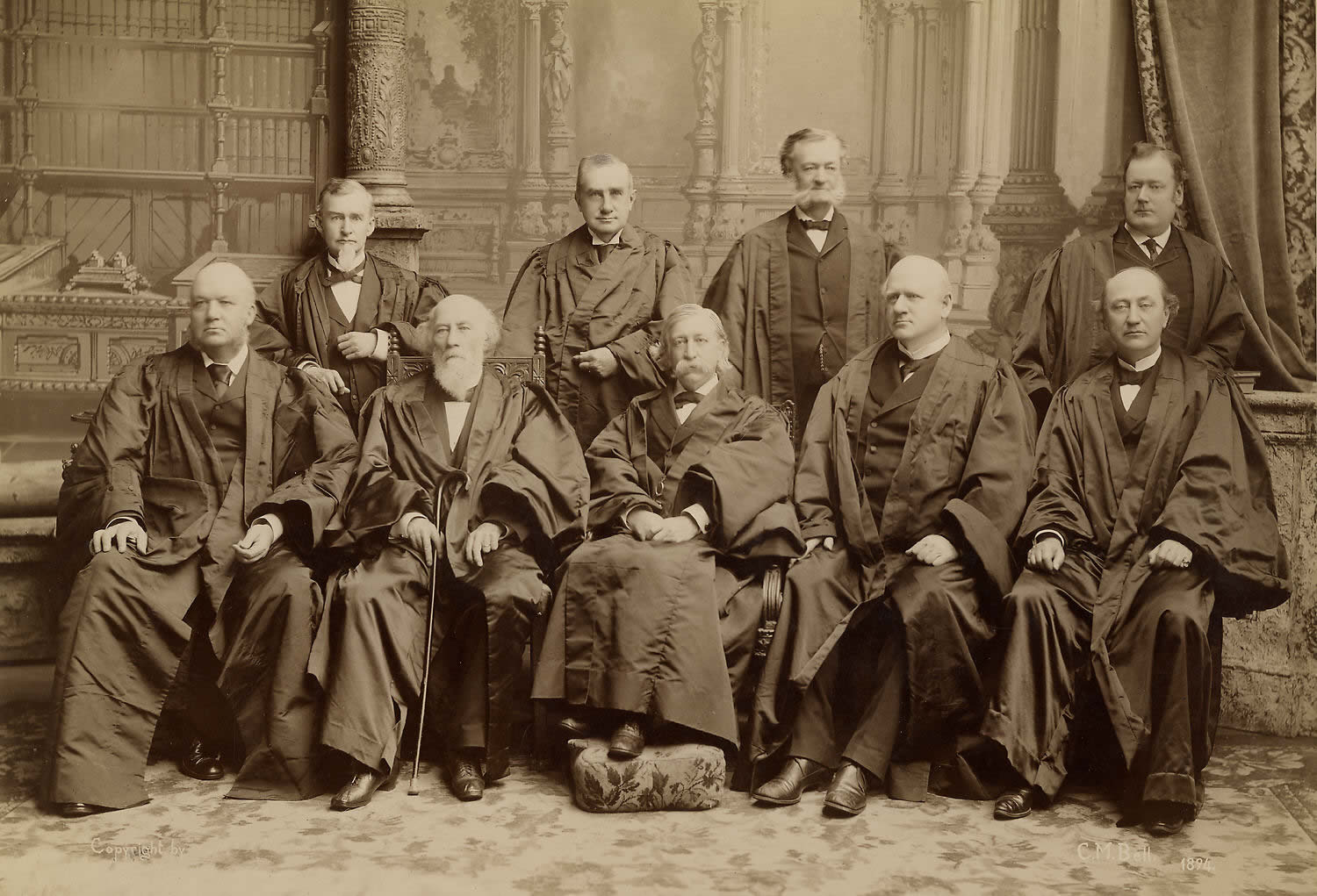
The Fuller Court.

The opinion, delivered by Justice Harlan, dismissed the claim of due process under the Fifth Amendment since this amendment's due process requirement did not apply to the states. Harlan noted that this claim was probably an accident of the attorney who prepared the petition. He noted that the due process requirement of the Fourteenth Amendment was also not violated, since this is the due process that applies to the states.

Code Cr. Proc. N. Y. § 555 stated that the trial court to which the habeas corpus petition was presented may rule in favor of granting him bail while the appeal was proceeding, and the opinion mentions that this means that the initial trial court had discretion to grant or deny bail. Since the circuit court denied bail, the opinion stated this was consistent with New York law, so that decision was not before the court to review.

The Court concluded by affirming the judgment of the circuit court which denied the habeas corpus petition.
