= Idylwild Wildlife Management Area =

Protected area in Maryland, United States

- Location within Maryland
- Location: Caroline, Maryland, United States
- Coordinates: 38°43′36″N 75°45′26″W
- Area: 3,800 acres (15 km^{2})
- Operator: Maryland Department of Natural Resources
- Website: Idylwild WMA

Idylwild Wildlife Management Area is a Wildlife Management Area in Caroline County, Maryland near Federalsburg. The 3,800 acres (1,500 ha) area is bounded on the west by Marshyhope Creek, with areas of wetlands.
