= Cedar Island Wildlife Management Area =

State Wildlife Management Area in Somerset County, Maryland

- IUCN category V (protected landscape/seascape)
- Location within Maryland Location within the United States
- Location: Somerset, Maryland, United States
- Coordinates: 37°55′45.5″N 75°52′30″W
- Operator: Maryland Department of Natural Resources
- Website: Cedar Island WMA

Cedar Island Wildlife Management Area is a Wildlife Management Area in Somerset County, Maryland near Crisfield. The area is almost 3,000 acres (1,200 ha) in extent on Tangier Sound in the Chesapeake Bay. The area was primarily established to protect black duck habitat and is notable for its concentration of the species.
