= Pocomoke River State Park =

State park in Worcester County, Maryland

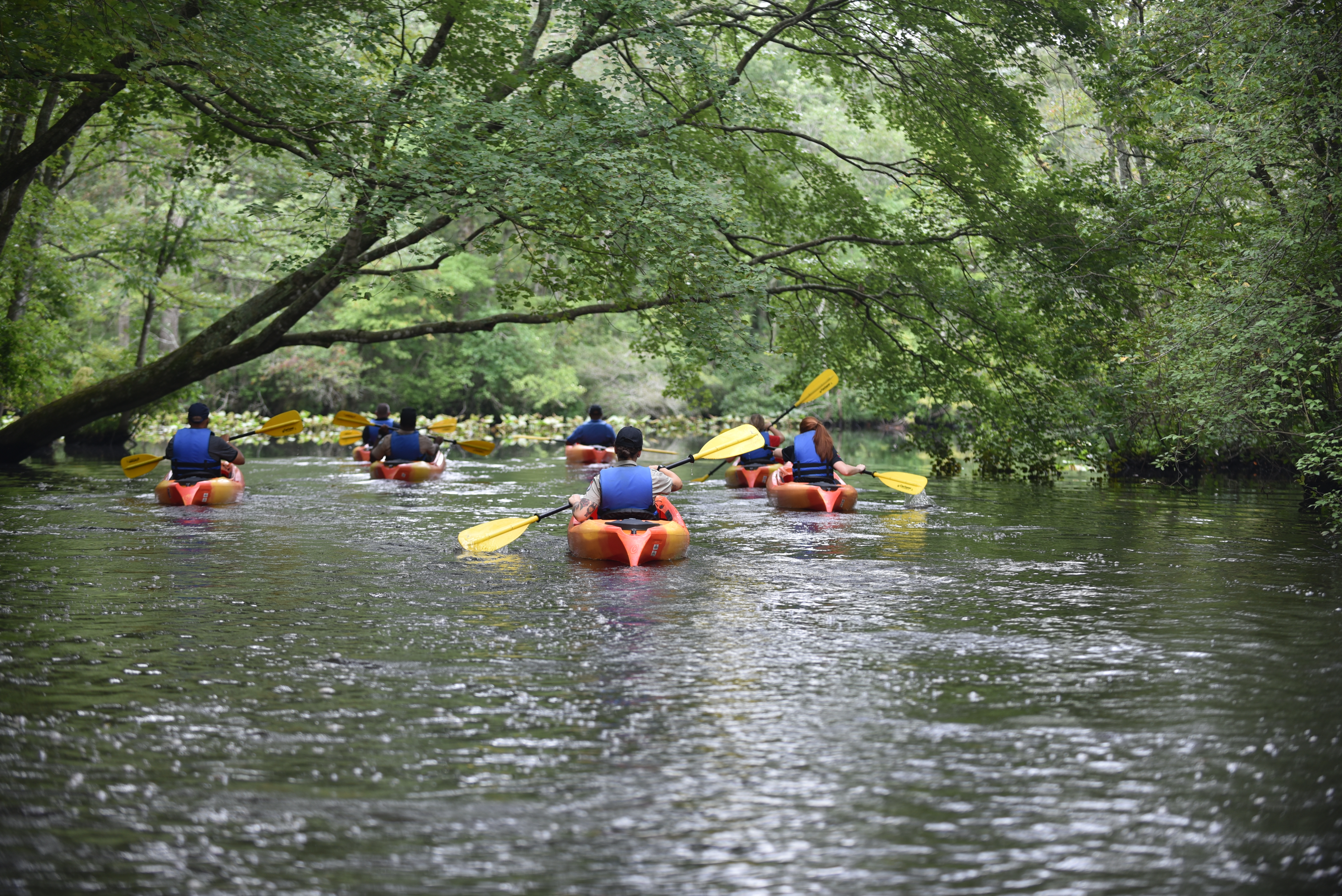
- Kayakers at Pocomoke River State Park, 2019

- Location within Maryland
- Location: Worcester County, Maryland, United States
- Nearest city: Pocomoke City, Maryland
- Coordinates: 38°07′29″N 75°29′23″W
- Area: 916 acres (371 ha)
- Elevation: 13 ft (4.0 m)
- Established: 1939
- Administrator: Maryland Department of Natural Resources
- Designation: Maryland state park
- Website: Official website

Pocomoke River State Park is a Maryland state park lying on both banks of the Pocomoke River between Snow Hill and Pocomoke City in Worcester County, Maryland. The park comprises two areas within Pocomoke State Forest: Shad Landing on the south bank of the river and Milburn Landing on the north bank.

== History ==
The Civilian Conservation Corps developed recreational facilities in the forest in the 1930s. The state assumed control of Shad Landing and Milburn Landing through a license agreement with the federal government in 1939, before taking full possession of the forest lands in 1955.

== Ecology ==
The park's combination of freshwater swamp and upland, as well as its location between northern and southern physiographic regions, allows for a great diversity of plant and animal life. Notable plant species include flowering dogwood and mountain laurel in the spring, bald cypress, tupelo, yellow pond lily, and loblolly pine. Animals observed include northern river otters, muskrat, prothonotary warblers, pileated woodpeckers, bald eagles, northern water snakes, and broad-headed skinks as well as over 50 species of fish, including largemouth bass and chain pickerel.

== Activities and amenities ==
The park offers fishing, camping, cabins, boat launch, canoeing, hiking and biking trails, picnic areas and pavilions, and playgrounds. The Shad Landing area also has a marina, camp store, swimming pool, and nature center with representatives of native animal species.
