= Maryland Marine Properties Wildlife Management Area =

Protected area in Maryland, United States

Coordinates: 37°59′9″N 75°40′49″W

Maryland Marine Properties Wildlife Management Area is a Wildlife Management Area in Somerset County, Maryland. It is 1,130 acres and primarily consists of marshlands, forested wetlands and fields.
