= Saxis Wildlife Management Area =

Protected area of Virginia, United States

- IUCN category V (protected landscape/seascape)
- Location within Virginia Location within the United States
- Location: Accomack County, Virginia
- Coordinates: 37°55′10″N 75°42′9″W
- Area: 5,578 acres (22.57 km^{2})
- Governing body: Virginia Department of Game and Inland Fisheries

Saxis Wildlife Management Area is a 5,578-acre (22.57 km^{2}) Wildlife Management Area (WMA) in Accomack County, Virginia. Predominantly tidal marshland, it is divided into three tracts, all located on peninsulas bordering on brackish waters such as Beasley Bay, Pocomoke Sound, and Messongo Creek. Several smaller freshwater creeks are also found on the property. Portions of the area farthest inland are occupied by hummocks. The property is maintained by the Virginia Department of Game and Inland Fisheries mostly in its natural state, with little in the way of human management or development.

The area has been designated an Important Bird Area (IBA) by the National Audubon Society as a part of the "Delmarva Bayside Marshes IBA", which also includes the nearby Mark's and Jack's Island Natural Area Preserve and Parkers Marsh Natural Area Preserve.

Saxis WMA is open to the public for hunting, trapping, fishing, hiking, boating, and primitive camping. Access for persons 17 years of age or older requires a valid hunting or fishing permit, a current Virginia boat registration, or a WMA access permit.

== See also ==
- List of Virginia Wildlife Management Areas
