= Sideling Hill Wildlife Management Area =

Wildlife Management Area in Maryland, US

Coordinates: 39°39′7″N 78°19′20″W

Sideling Hill Wildlife Management Area is a Wildlife Management Area in Allegany and Washington County, Maryland. The area is named for Sideling Hill, where a spectacular manmade notch was cut to allow Interstate 68 to pass through.
