= Pocomoke Sound Wildlife Management Area =

Protected area in Maryland, United States

Coordinates: 37°58′4″N 75°47′55″W

Pocomoke Sound Wildlife Management Area is a Wildlife Management Area in Somerset County, Maryland.
