= South Marsh Island Wildlife Management Area =

Wildlife Management Area in Maryland, US

Coordinates: 38°5′58.5″N 76°1′34.5″W

South Marsh Island Wildlife Management Area is a Wildlife Management Area in Somerset County, Maryland.
