= Dan's Mountain Wildlife Management Area =

State Wildlife Management Area in Allegany County, Maryland

- IUCN category V (protected landscape/seascape)
- Location within Maryland
- Location: Allegany, Maryland, United States
- Coordinates: 39°34′0″N 78°55′24″W
- Area: 9,783 acres (39.59 km^{2})
- Operator: Maryland Department of Natural Resources
- Website: Dan's Mountain WMA

Dan's Mountain Wildlife Management Area is a Wildlife Management Area in Allegany County, Maryland. The area covers forested mountainous terrain between altitudes of 900 feet (270 m) to 2,800 feet (850 m) above the North Branch of the Potomac River. Bobcats and black bears are found in the area. Hunting activities are primarily oriented around white-tailed deer and turkeys.
