= Dividing Creek (Pocomoke River tributary) =

Location
- Country: United States
- State: Maryland
- Region: Delmarva Peninsula

Physical characteristics
- Source
  - coordinates: 38°17′23″N 75°35′12″W
- Mouth
  - coordinates: 38°5′23″N 75°32′28″W
- Length: 19.1 mi (30.7 km)

Dividing Creek is a 19.1-mile-long (30.7 km) tributary of the Pocomoke River on the Delmarva Peninsula. It rises in Wicomico County, Maryland, and forms the boundary between Somerset and Worcester counties.

The entire watershed is in the Atlantic coastal plain and quickly reaches sea level at the Pocomoke. The original county courthouse for pre-1742 Somerset County was located not far above the mouth of Dividing Creek, close to its west bank.
