= Myrtle Grove Wildlife Management Area =

Protected area in Maryland, United States

Coordinates: 38°33′50″N 77°4′57″W

Signs at main entrance

Myrtle Grove Wildlife Management Area is a Wildlife Management Area in Charles County, Maryland, United States. There is a shooting range.

The original property encompassed only 754 acres but has now expanded to 5,190 acres. There are 13 public parking areas.

Game and fishing:

The largest lake itself is 23 acres and is periodically stocked with rainbow trout. Most of the surrounding area is open for hunting as well. In addition to trout, the lake is home to catfish, pickerel, largemouth bass, and bluegills.

Shotgun shells at the trap range, with broken clay in the distance
