= Pocomoke River =

River in Maryland, United States

Coordinates: 37°57′55″N 75°38′59″W

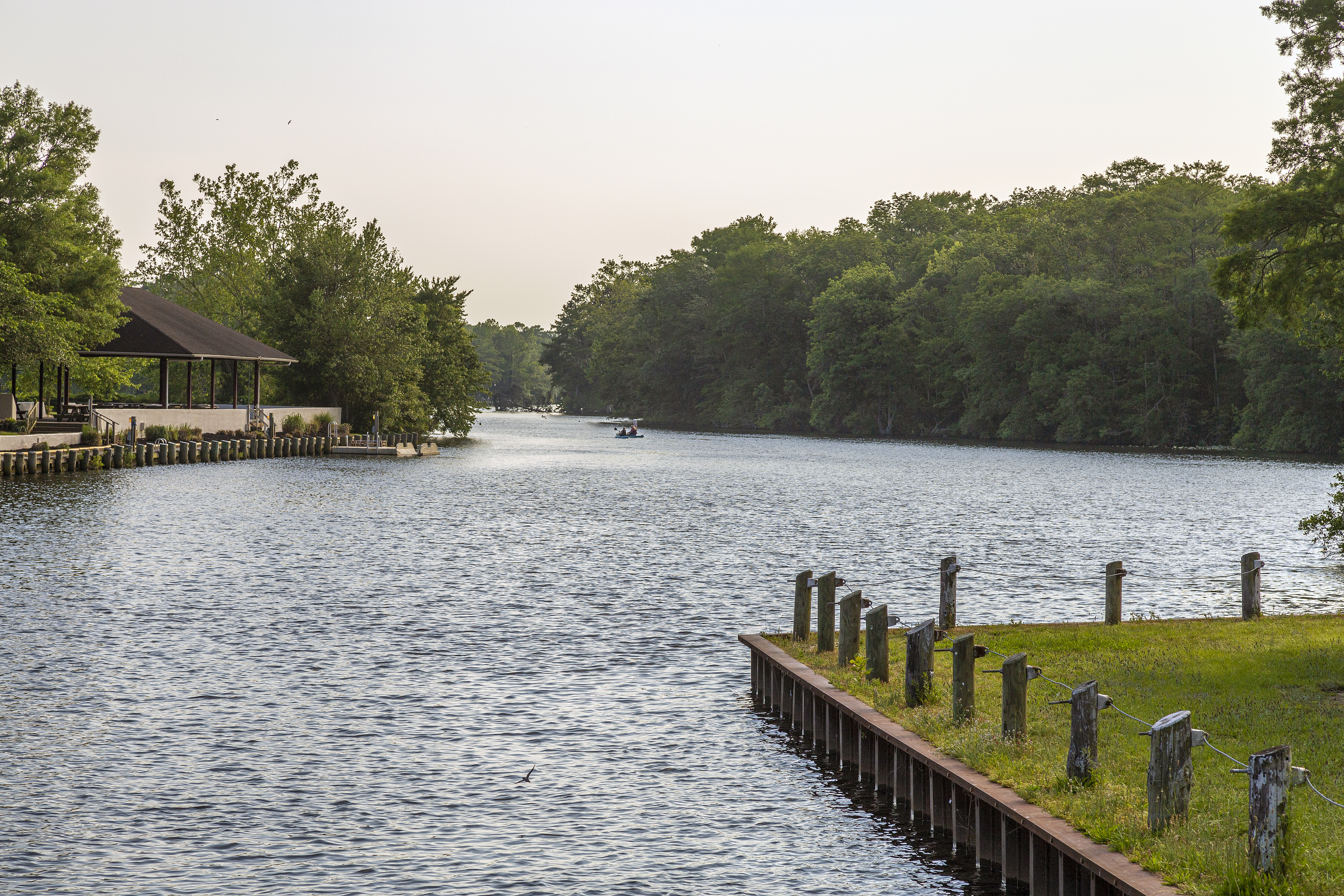

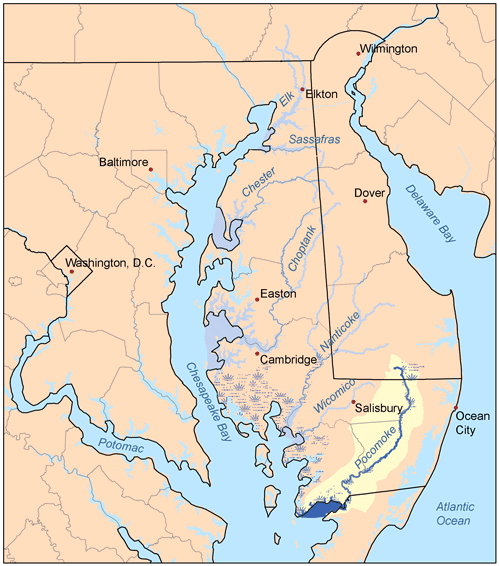
- Map of the rivers of the Eastern Shore of Maryland with the Pocomoke and its watershed highlighted.

Location
- Country: United States
- State: Delaware, Maryland, & Virginia
- Region: Delmarva Peninsula

Physical characteristics
- Source: Great Cypress Swamp
- Mouth: Pocomoke Sound
  - elevation: 0 ft (0 m)
- Length: 66 mi (106 km), northeast-to-southwest

Basin features
- Tributaries
  - left: Dividing Creek, Nassawango Creek, Givens Branch, Aydelotte Branch
  - right: Pitts Creek, Pilchard Creek, Mattaponi Creek, Corkers Creek

The Pocomoke River stretches approximately 66 miles (106 km) from southern Delaware through southeastern Maryland in the United States. At its mouth, the river is essentially an arm of the Chesapeake Bay, whereas the upper river flows through a series of relatively inaccessible wetlands called the Great Cypress Swamp, largely populated by Loblolly Pine, Red Maple and Bald Cypress. The river is the easternmost river that flows into the Chesapeake Bay. "Pocomoke" locally /ˈpoʊkoʊmoʊk/, though traditionally interpreted as "dark (or black) water" by local residents, is now agreed by scholars of the Algonquian languages to be derived from the words for "broken (or pierced) ground."

== Description ==
It rises in several forks in the Great Cypress Swamp in southern Sussex County, Delaware. From there, it flows south into Maryland, forming the boundary between Wicomico and Worcester counties and flowing through the swamps that are named for the river. At Porter's Crossing it turns southwest, broadening into a slow meandering river, flowing past the town of Snow Hill, and then through the Pocomoke River State Forest and past Pocomoke River State Park. It then flows past Pocomoke City, and enters Pocomoke Sound on the Chesapeake Bay on the state line between Maryland and Virginia.

It receives Nassawango Creek from the northwest approximately 1 mile (1.6 km) southwest of Snow Hill. It receives Dividing Creek from the north approximately 1 mile northeast of Pocomoke City.

The Pocomoke River is designated as a "Scenic" river by the State of Maryland.

== History ==
In 1635 the mouth of the river was the scene of the first recorded battle in North America between Englishmen. The dispute was between the Virginia Company and Lord Baltimore, the proprietor of the Maryland Colony, over the rights to Kent Island at the mouth of the Chester River. The dispute was eventually resolved with a victory for the Maryland colonists.

During the colonial era, various landings grew up along the river, some of which became towns, while others faded into obscurity with the decline of water-borne transport. From the mouth of the river, they are (or were), on the right bank: the landings at Shelltown (called for many years Steamboat Landing) and Rehobeth (both in Somerset County), Puncheon Landing, Stevens Ferry, Cottinghams Ferry, Milburn Landing (now in the Milburn Landing section of the Pocomoke River State Park), and Adams Wharf, all in Worcester County. The landings on the left bank are (or were): Pitts Creek Landing in Accomack County, Virginia, Cedar Hall Landing, Stevens Landing (also called Stevens Ferry, which became in turn Newtown and then Pocomoke City), Cottinghams Ferry, Mattapony Landing (also known as Gibbs Ferry), and finally Snow Hill, at the head of navigation, also all in Worcester County.

In 1785, after years of disputes over fishing in Pocomoke Sound and on the Pocomoke River, Maryland and Virginia entered into an interstate compact that regulated fishing in the area, established a common and free waterway, and covered how criminal trials concerning each other's citizens should be handled. In Wharton v. Wise, 153 U.S. 155 (1894), the Supreme Court of the United States determined that Pocomoke Sound was not covered by this famous interstate compact.

In 1913, to provide better navigation, the mouth of the river was dredged by the United States Army Corps of Engineers.

In the 1990s, a microorganism outbreak on the lower river, possibly Pfiesteria piscicida, led to widespread fish kills and illness among the watermen who fish the river and Pocomoke Sound. The illnesses included lesions, respiratory problems, and memory loss. As a result, the lower river and Pocomoke Sound were closed to fishing, boating, and swimming. It is currently hypothesized that the microorganism was present before the outbreak but became toxic due to elevated concentrations of organic waste that had built up in this sprawling coastal plain river.

== See also ==
- List of Delaware rivers
- List of Maryland rivers
