= Linkwood, Maryland =

Unincorporated community in Maryland, United States

- Unincorporated community
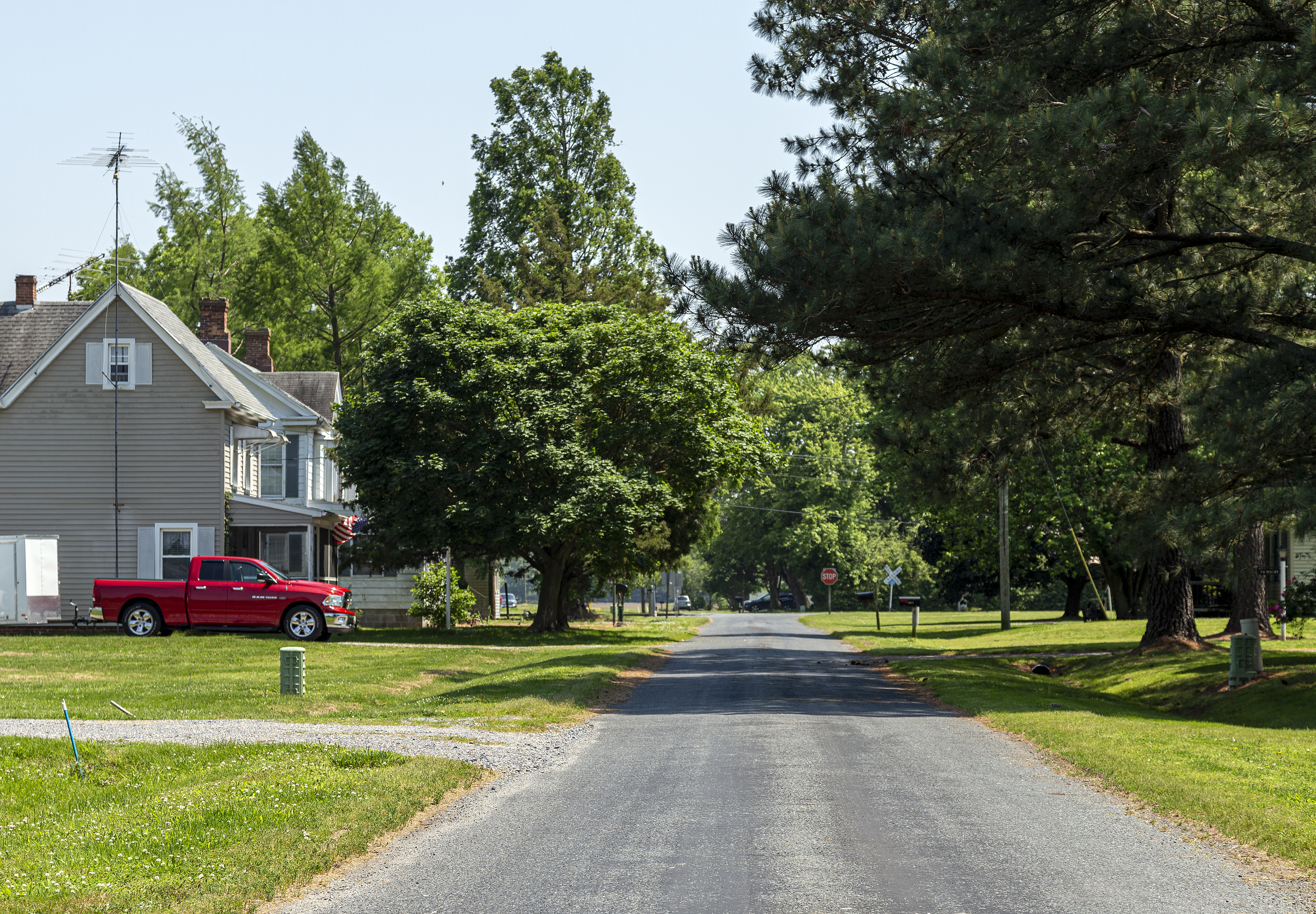
- Residential street and railroad crossing in Linkwood

- Location within Maryland Location within the United States
- Coordinates: 38°32′23″N 75°56′46″W
- Country: United States
- State: Maryland
- County: Dorchester
- Elevation: 20 ft (6.1 m)
- Time zone: UTC-5 (Eastern (EST))
  - Summer (DST): UTC-4 (EDT)
- ZIP code: 21835
- Area codes: 410, 443, and 667
- GNIS feature ID: 585427

Linkwood is an unincorporated community in Dorchester County, Maryland, United States. Linkwood is located at the intersection of U.S. Route 50 and Linkwood Road, southeast of Cambridge and northwest of Vienna.
