= Fairmount Wildlife Management Area =

Protected area in Maryland, United States

- IUCN category V (protected landscape/seascape)
- Location within Maryland Location within the United States
- Location: Somerset, Maryland, United States
- Coordinates: 38°5′20″N 75°48′40″W
- Area: 4,000 acres (16 km^{2})>
- Operator: Maryland Department of Natural Resources
- Website: Fairmount WMA

Fairmount Wildlife Management Area is a Wildlife Management Area in Somerset County, Maryland. The wildlife management area comprises more than 4,000 acres (1,600 ha) of mostly marshland. It is located on the Eastern Shore of Maryland along the Chesapeake Bay between the Manokin and Annemessex Rivers in Somerset County. American black duck, northern pintail, gadwall, American wigeon, blue and green-winged teal, and many other species of waterfowl can be found in the area.
