= Larry Hogan =

Governor of Maryland from 2015 to 2023

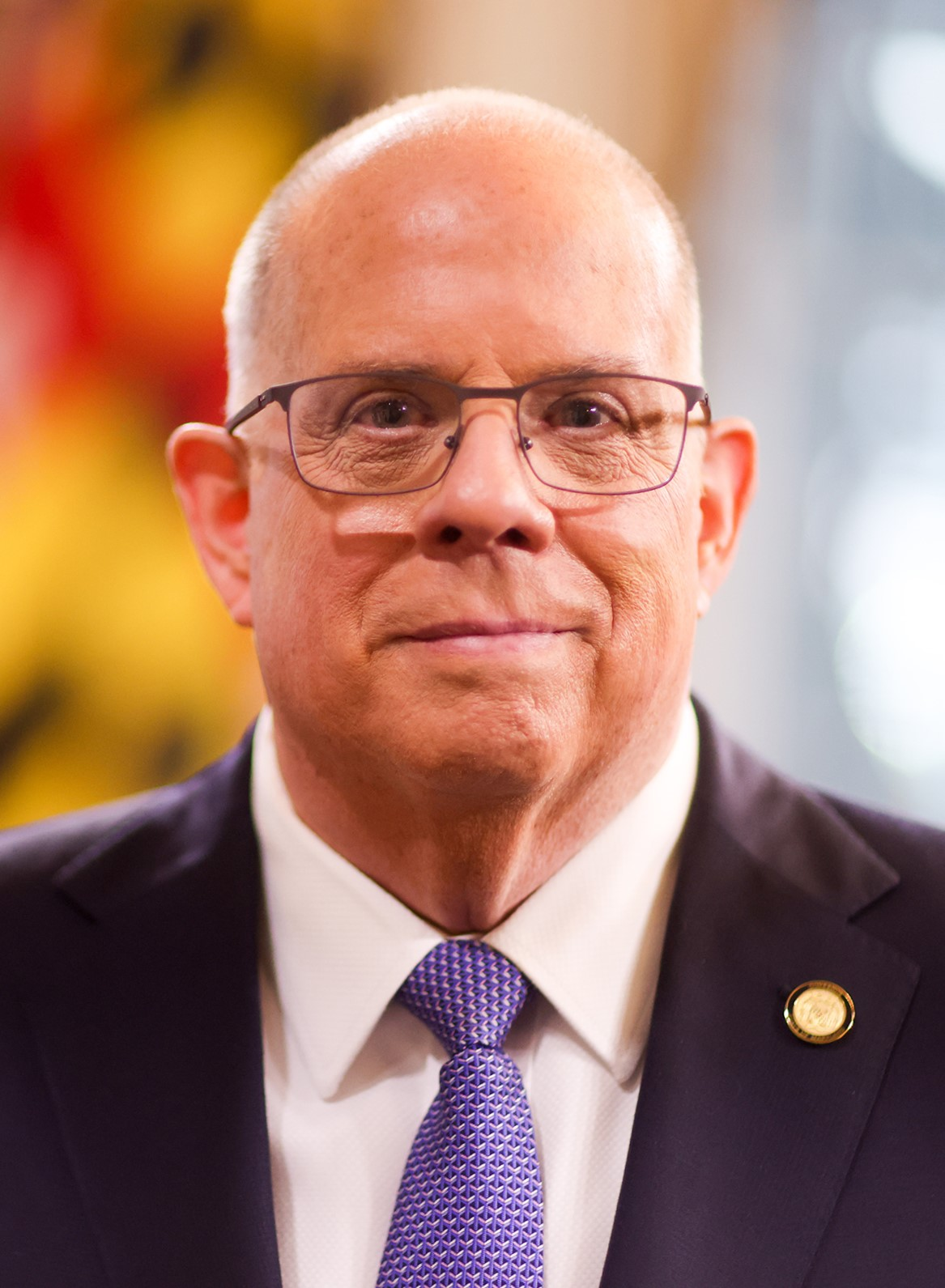
- Hogan in 2021

62nd Governor of Maryland
- In office January 21, 2015 – January 18, 2023
- Lieutenant: Boyd Rutherford
- Preceded by: Martin O'Malley
- Succeeded by: Wes Moore

Chair of the National Governors Association
- In office July 26, 2019 – August 5, 2020
- Preceded by: Steve Bullock
- Succeeded by: Andrew Cuomo

Secretary of Appointments of Maryland
- In office January 15, 2003 – January 17, 2007
- Governor: Bob Ehrlich
- Preceded by: Erin Castleberry
- Succeeded by: Jeanne Hitchcock

Personal details
- Born: Lawrence Joseph Hogan Jr. May 25, 1956 (age 70) Washington, D.C., U.S.
- Party: Republican
- Spouse: Yumi Kim (m. 2004)
- Relatives: Lawrence Hogan (father); Patrick N. Hogan (half-brother)
- Education: Florida State University (BA)
- Hogan's voice Hogan announcing the launch of the Tier 2 NEPA study on a second Chesapeake Bay Bridge. Recorded June 10, 2022.

Lawrence Joseph Hogan Jr. (born May 25, 1956) is an American politician and businessman who served as the 62nd governor of Maryland from 2015 to 2023. A member of the Republican Party and son of three-term U.S. representative Lawrence Hogan, he served as co-chair of the centrist organization No Labels from 2020 to 2023. As of 2026, Hogan and Boyd Rutherford, his lieutenant governor, are the last Republicans to have won or held statewide office in Maryland.

Hogan unsuccessfully campaigned for his father's old district, Maryland's 5th congressional district in 1981 and 1992, the latter of which was incumbent Steny Hoyer's closest race. He then served in the cabinet of governor Bob Ehrlich from 2003 to 2007 as Maryland Secretary of Appointments. In 2011, Hogan founded the Change Maryland organization, which he used to promote his 2014 gubernatorial campaign. He campaigned as a moderate Republican and defeated Democrat Anthony Brown in the general election in what was considered an upset. Hogan was reelected in 2018, defeating Democrat Ben Jealous, to become Maryland's first two-term Republican governor since Theodore McKeldin won re-election in 1954. He was term limited from running for a third term in 2022, though refused to endorse Republican candidate Dan Cox. Hogan was succeeded by Democrat Wes Moore and left office as one of the most popular governors in the country.

After leaving office, Hogan was initially seen as a likely contender for the Republican nomination in the 2024 presidential election, but he declined to run and later endorsed Nikki Haley instead of the eventual nominee, Donald Trump. On February 9, 2024, Hogan filed and launched a campaign for the 2024 United States Senate election in Maryland, seeking to succeed retiring incumbent Democratic U.S. Senator Ben Cardin. He won the Republican primary election on May 14, 2024, but was defeated by Prince George's County Executive Angela Alsobrooks in the general election on November 5, 2024.

== Early life, family, and education ==
Hogan was born in 1956 in Washington, D.C., and grew up in Landover, Maryland, attending Saint Ambrose Catholic School and DeMatha Catholic High School. After his parents divorced in 1972, he moved to Florida with his mother and graduated from Father Lopez Catholic High School in 1974. Hogan is the son of Nora (Maguire) and Lawrence Hogan Sr., who served as U.S. Representative from Maryland's 5th congressional district from 1969 to 1975 and as Prince George's County executive from 1978 to 1982. Hogan Sr. was the first Republican member of the U.S. House Judiciary Committee to call for Richard Nixon's impeachment. His parents were both of Irish descent.

Hogan attended Florida State University from 1974 to 1978 and earned a Bachelor of Arts degree in government and political science.

== Early career ==
As the son of a U.S. representative, Hogan was exposed to politics at a young age and worked in many aspects of politics, including political campaigns and citizen referendums.

While in college, Hogan worked in the Florida legislature. Upon graduation, he worked on Capitol Hill. Hogan helped his father run a successful campaign in 1978 for Prince George's County executive and later worked for him as a low-paid "intergovernmental liaison".

In 1981, at age 24, Hogan first ran for office in the special election to fill the vacancy in Maryland's 5th congressional district left by Gladys Noon Spellman. Spellman had succeeded Hogan's father in the office. Hogan finished second out of 12 candidates in the Republican primary with 22% of the vote, behind Bowie Mayor Audrey Scott's 63%.

In 1985, Hogan founded Hogan Companies, which is engaged in brokerage, consulting, investment and development of land, commercial and residential properties. He spent the next 18 years in the private sector.

In 1992, Hogan was the Republican nominee for Maryland's 5th congressional district, running against Democratic incumbent Steny Hoyer. Hoyer outspent Hogan by a 6-to-1 margin. The race was the closest in Hoyer's tenure. Hogan won four of the district's five counties and 44% of the vote to Hoyer's 53%, with William Johnston (Independent) at 3%.

Hogan took a four-year leave of absence from his business to serve as Maryland's secretary of appointments in Bob Ehrlich's administration from 2003 to 2007. In this capacity, Hogan appointed over 7,000 people to positions in the Maryland government.

In 2011, Hogan founded Change Maryland, a nonprofit anti-tax advocacy organization that was used to criticize Governor Martin O'Malley's administration. The organization promoted Hogan's gubernatorial run, and his campaign eventually purchased its assets. The Maryland Democratic Party alleged that Hogan had improperly received campaign benefits from the nonprofit; the State Board of Elections dismissed two of the complaints but found Hogan's campaign had not properly disclosed the value of a poll the nonprofit did before purchasing its assets.

== Governor of Maryland ==
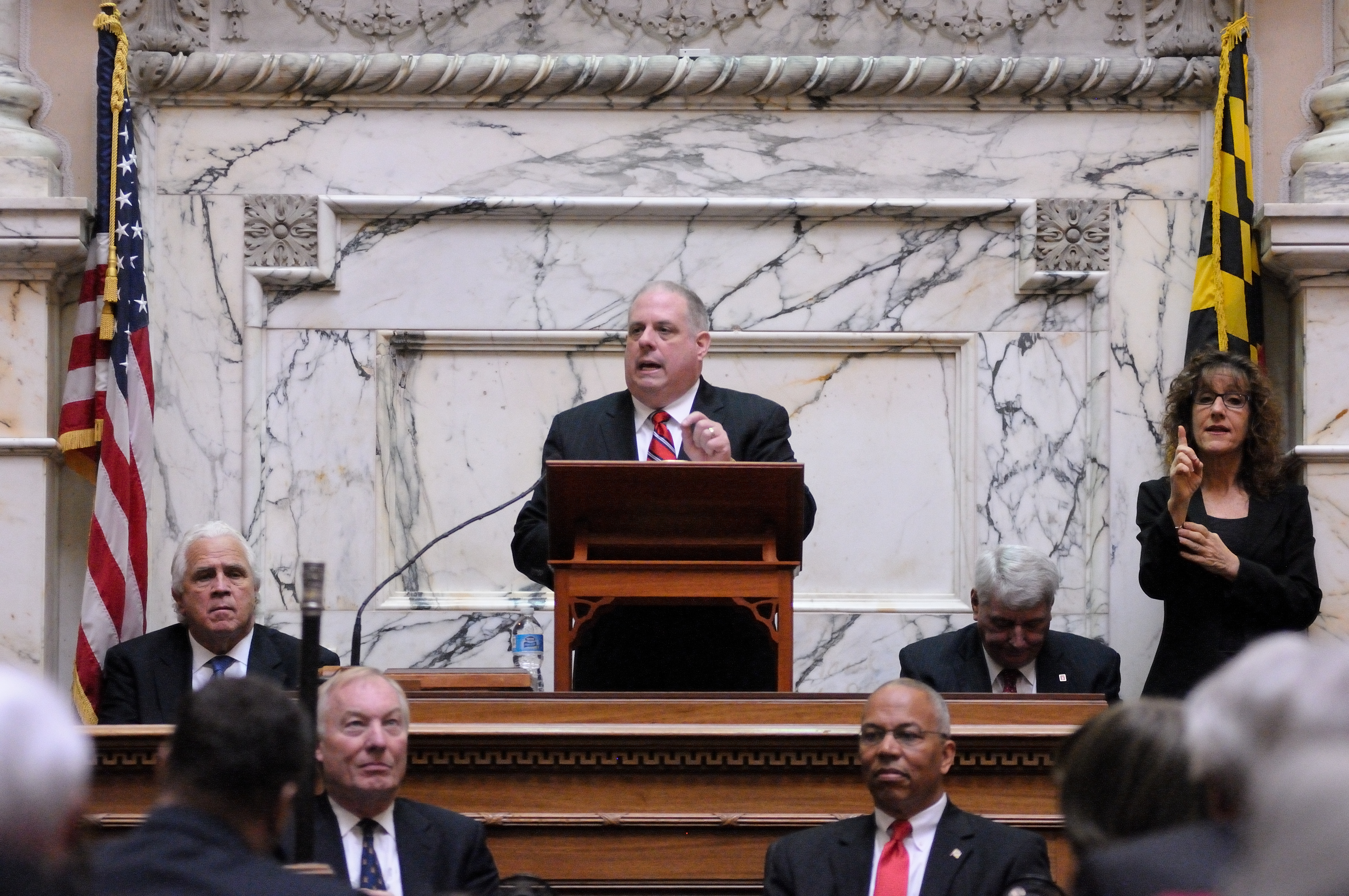
Hogan giving the State of the State address in 2016

As governor, media outlets labeled Hogan as a pragmatic and moderate Republican. In 2015, The Washington Post's editorial board wrote that he was "true to his promise to govern from the center in the first legislative session of his term." In a 2022 Morning Consult poll, Hogan was listed as the third-most popular governor in the United States, with a 70% approval rating. Despite his popularity, Hogan had no coattail effect on any downballot races in Maryland, with Democrats expanding their legislative supermajority and picking up several county-level seats during his tenure.

As governor, Hogan had a more hands-off approach to legislating, having never testified for any of the bills he proposed each year, unlike previous governors. He left office with few legislative accomplishments, but defended his approach to legislating by saying that he "never intended to enact a bunch of policies". Hogan frequently vetoed bills passed by the Maryland General Assembly, which was controlled by a Democratic supermajority during his entire tenure as governor, meaning that legislative leaders had to ensure bills passed by veto-proof majorities and had to schedule enough time for the legislature to override his vetoes on priority bills.

Hogan served as vice chair of the National Governors Association (NGA) from 2018 to 2019 and as chair from 2019 to 2020. In 2019, Hogan raised the possibility of running for president in 2020, but he later decided not to run. In June, he addressed the Maryland Free Enterprise Foundation, a business advocacy group, in a combative speech, "skewering Democrats who control the state legislature and vowing to spend the remainder of his term in 'battle' with them." Hogan promised to work against tax increases.

Hogan's real estate business repeatedly came under scrutiny during his tenure as governor, as Hogan was a member of the Maryland Board of Public Works and had the ability to set rules for state housing projects and to award grants and tax credits to developers. Shortly after becoming governor, Hogan entered into a trust agreement that was managed by his younger brother, Timothy, and allowed him to remain informed of his real estate firm's investments, including its finances and the locations of its real estate projects.

In January 2020, Washington Monthly, a political magazine, reported that Hogan allegedly continued to regularly meet with the firm's trustees, held properties near state transportation projects that he earmarked funding for in the state's annual budget, and did not disclose any of his nearby property interests to the General Assembly before legislators voted to approve such funding, thus allowing him to profit from state investments. A spokesperson for Hogan denied these accusations, saying that Hogan was in full compliance with the state's ethics laws and had no involvement in the decision to fund these transportation projects. During the 2021 legislative session, the Maryland General Assembly unanimously passed the Integrity in High Office Act, which would require statewide officials to submit enhanced disclosures detailing the businesses/subsidiaries and properties they owned. The bill became law without Governor Hogan's signature. At least two ethics complaints relating to Hogan's potential conflicts of interest were also filed against him, but state officials failed to discover any ethics laws he violated as of October 2024.

In October 2024, an investigation from Time found that Hogan awarded nearly 40 percent of the state's competitive affordable housing awards to developers listed as clients to Hogan's firm. Time found no record of him ever recusing himself while in office. When asked about these affordable housing contracts by reporters, Hogan said he had not read the Time report, but described it as an "October surprise" that didn't have any truth to it. After the Time report was published, Maryland Democrats—including Hogan's successor, Governor Wes Moore—called for investigations into state contracts approved by Hogan and endorsed legislation requiring future governors to use blind trusts to manage their finances, which Governor Moore signed into law in May 2025. Time followed up by reporting that Hogan awarded millions in competitive affordable housing contracts to land owned by his stepmother, Ilona Hogan, who later sold the property for $3.75 million in November 2022.

Between taking office and February 2017, Hogan's Facebook page blocked over 450 people. One spokesman said about half had used "hateful or racist" language, while the rest were part of a "coordinated attack". Affected Marylanders said they had reached out to the governor via Facebook after the 2015 Baltimore protests as well as Donald Trump's Executive Order 13769 in January 2017, which banned travelers from seven predominantly Muslim countries.

In March 2017, it was discovered that Hogan staffers altered headlines of The Baltimore Sun and DelmarvaNow articles posted on his Facebook page to falsely imply General Assembly support for Hogan's so-called "Road Kill Bill". After the Baltimore Sun contacted Hogan's office about the doctored headlines, the office rectified the problem.

=== 2014 campaign ===
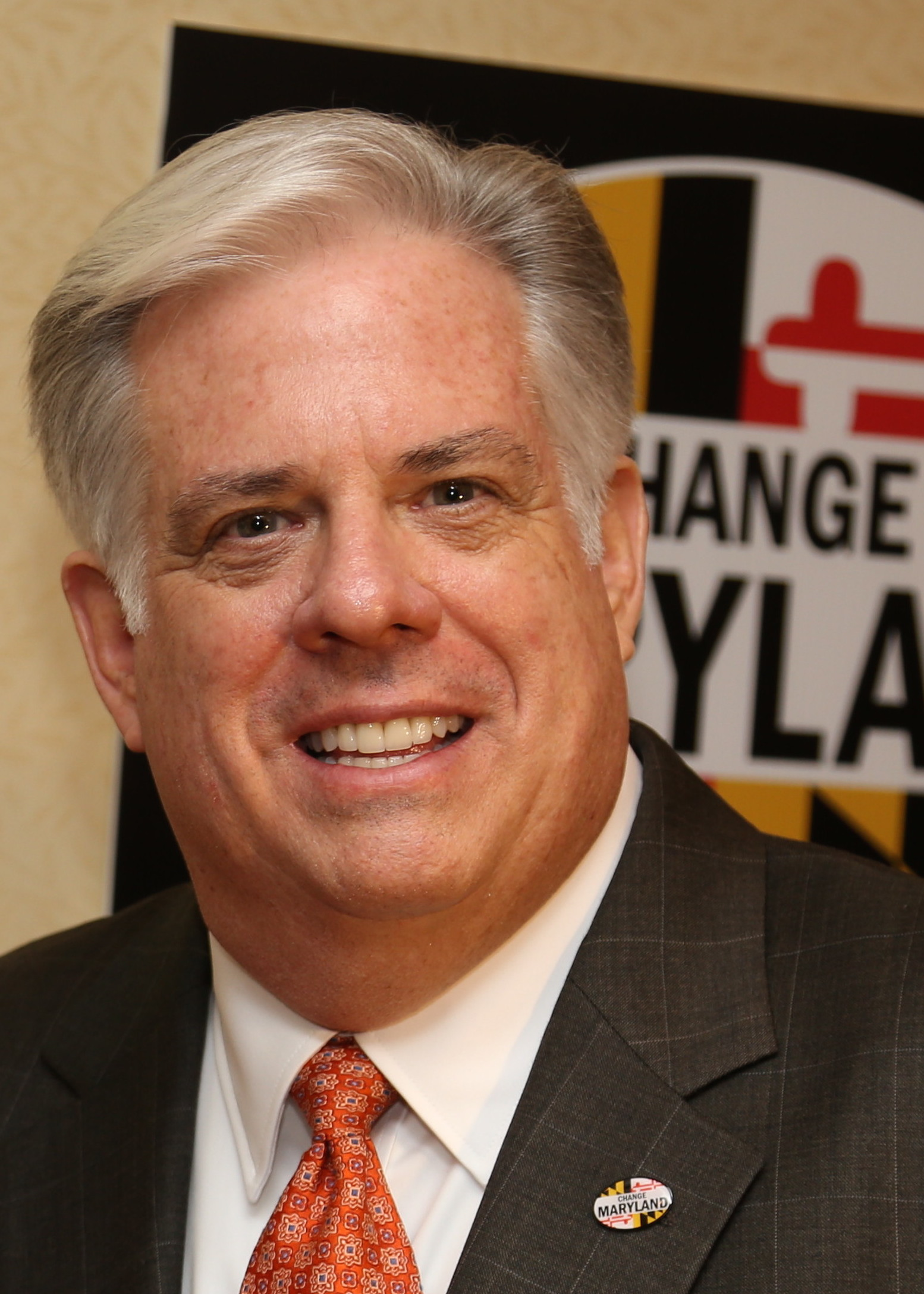
Hogan in 2013

During the Maryland Republican Party's semi-annual convention in November 2013, Hogan formed an exploratory committee to explore a potential run for governor of Maryland in 2014. On January 20, 2014, he officially announced his run at a rally in Annapolis, Maryland, and named former Maryland General Services Secretary Boyd Rutherford as his running mate a week later.

During his campaign, Hogan utilized the state's public campaign financing system in both the primary and general elections, becoming the first candidate to do so in 20 years. He ran on a platform of fiscal issues, largely avoiding questions about his positions on social issues like gun control and abortion by saying that he would respect Maryland's current laws and refusing to elaborate on his positions until he took office. He also sought to make the election into a referendum on Martin O'Malley's tenure, comparing himself to Ehrlich in the 2002 Maryland gubernatorial election. Hogan spent $1.9 million during the Republican primary election, in which he faced Harford County Executive David R. Craig, state delegate Ron George, and businessman Charles Lollar. He won the Republican primary election with 43 percent of the vote on June 24, 2014.

Hogan continued to campaign on economic issues into the general election, in which he faced Lieutenant Governor Anthony Brown, who ran a barrage of negative ads against Hogan scrutinizing his past comments on social issues but otherwise disregarded Hogan's campaign, saying that winning the general election would just be "a little bit of a mole hill" compared to the primary election. Brown also outspent Hogan in the general election, with Democrats spending $18.3 million and Republicans spending $5.9 million. On November 4, 2014, he defeated Brown in the general election with 51 percent of the vote in what many considered to be an upset victory. Media outlets attributed Hogan's victory to a strong performance in rural parts of the state and Baltimore's suburban counties, low Democratic turnout, and Brown's inability to separate himself from O'Malley. Hogan is the first governor to be elected from Anne Arundel County in over 100 years.

=== 2018 reelection ===
In the 2018 gubernatorial election, Hogan faced Democratic nominee Ben Jealous, a former NAACP president. Hogan enjoyed significant polling and fundraising leads over Jealous throughout the campaign. He defeated Jealous, 55% to 44%, becoming only the second Republican governor in Maryland history to be reelected, and the first since Theodore McKeldin in 1954. Hogan received more votes in the election than any prior gubernatorial candidate in Maryland.

=== 2022 gubernatorial election ===
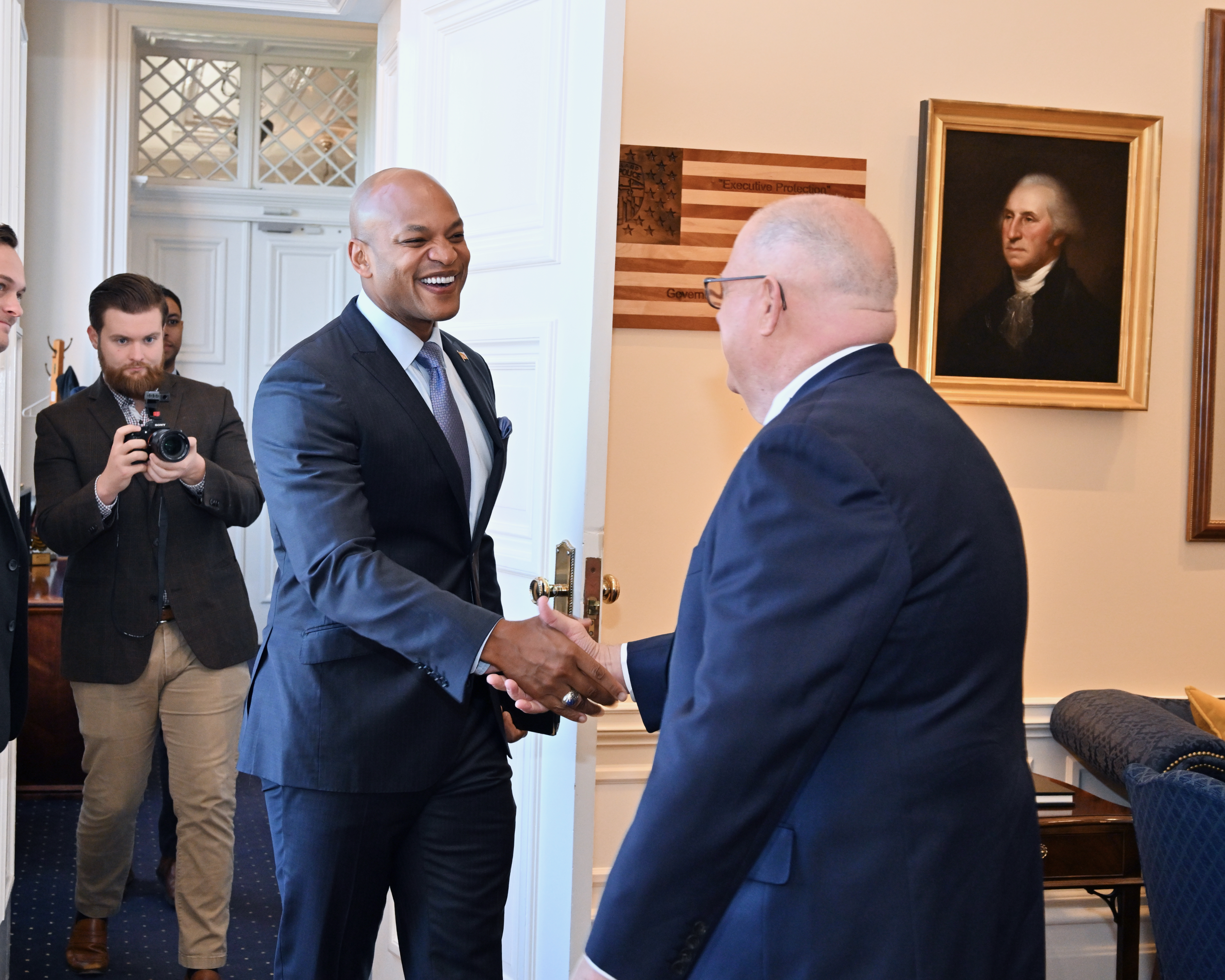
Hogan with Governor-elect Wes Moore, November 2022

As Hogan was term-limited, he did not run in the 2022 gubernatorial election. In November 2021, he endorsed the campaign of his commerce secretary, Kelly Schulz. After Schulz lost the Republican primary to state delegate Dan Cox, who was much farther to the right than the generally centrist Hogan, he said that he would not support Cox in the general election. Hogan blamed "collusion" between the Democratic Governors Association (DGA) and former president Donald Trump for Cox's primary win. According to The New York Times, the DGA spent over $1.16 million on television advertisements promoting Cox, who was endorsed by Trump. Hogan also criticized Democrats for "emboldening" Cox, whom Hogan called a "QAnon conspiracy theorist", and likened their efforts to "play[ing] Russian roulette with the Maryland statehouse". Hogan declined to say who he voted for in the general election. After the election, he congratulated governor-elect Wes Moore. Hogan delivered his farewell address as governor on January 10, 2023. His term expired on January 18.

=== Cabinet ===
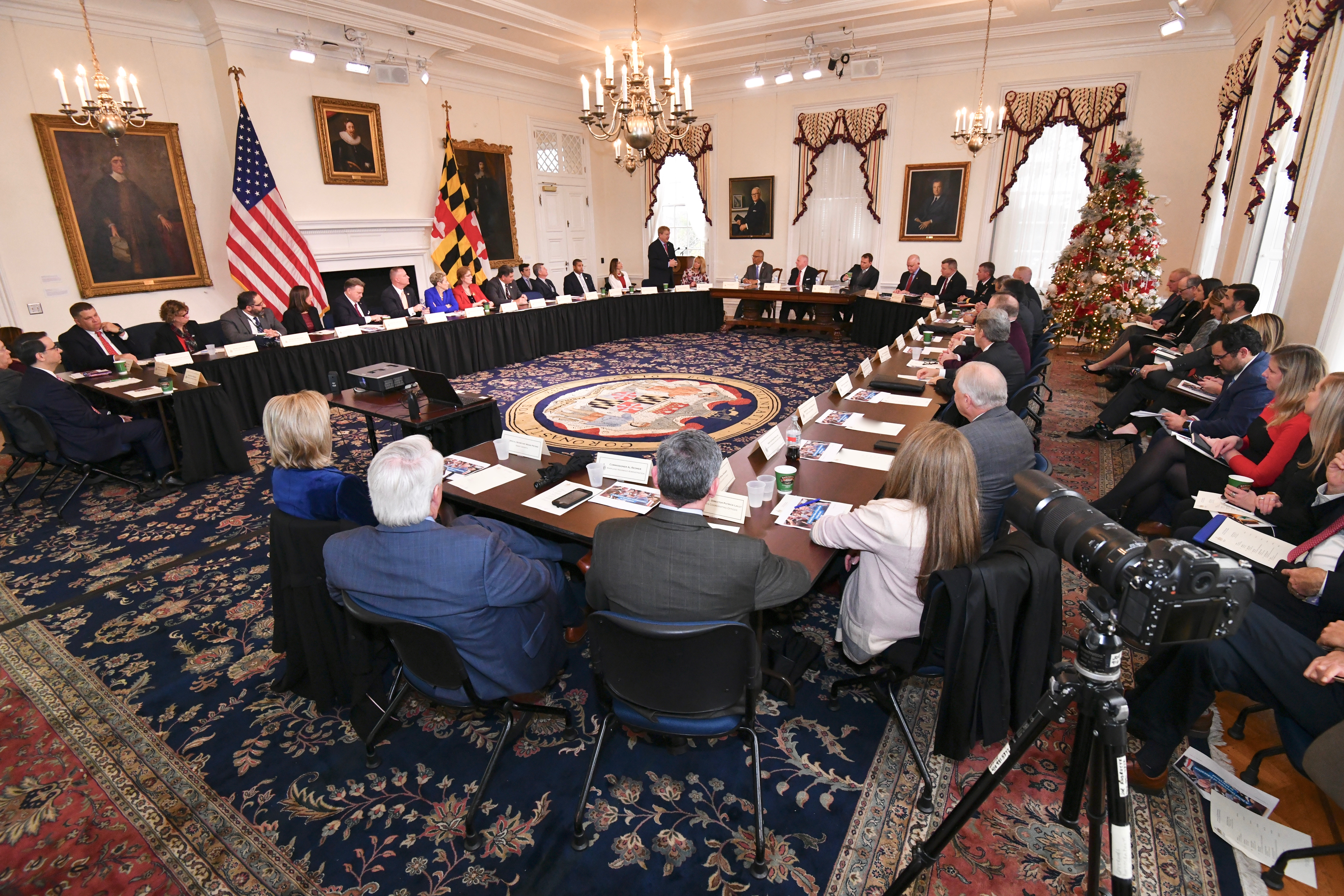
Hogan meets with his cabinet, 2019

Following his victory, Hogan promised to assemble a cabinet consisting of both Republicans and Democrats. He began announcing nominations for his 26-member cabinet on December 17, 2014. Of these nominees, five were Democrats: Sam Abed (who was also the only holdover from the O'Malley administration), Rona Kramer, George W. Owings III, Van Mitchell, and Joseph Bartenfelder. Other notable individuals who Hogan named to his administration include Kenneth Holt, Kelly Schulz, David Brinkley, David Craig, Robert Neall, and Joseph Getty.

=== Issues ===
==== Education ====
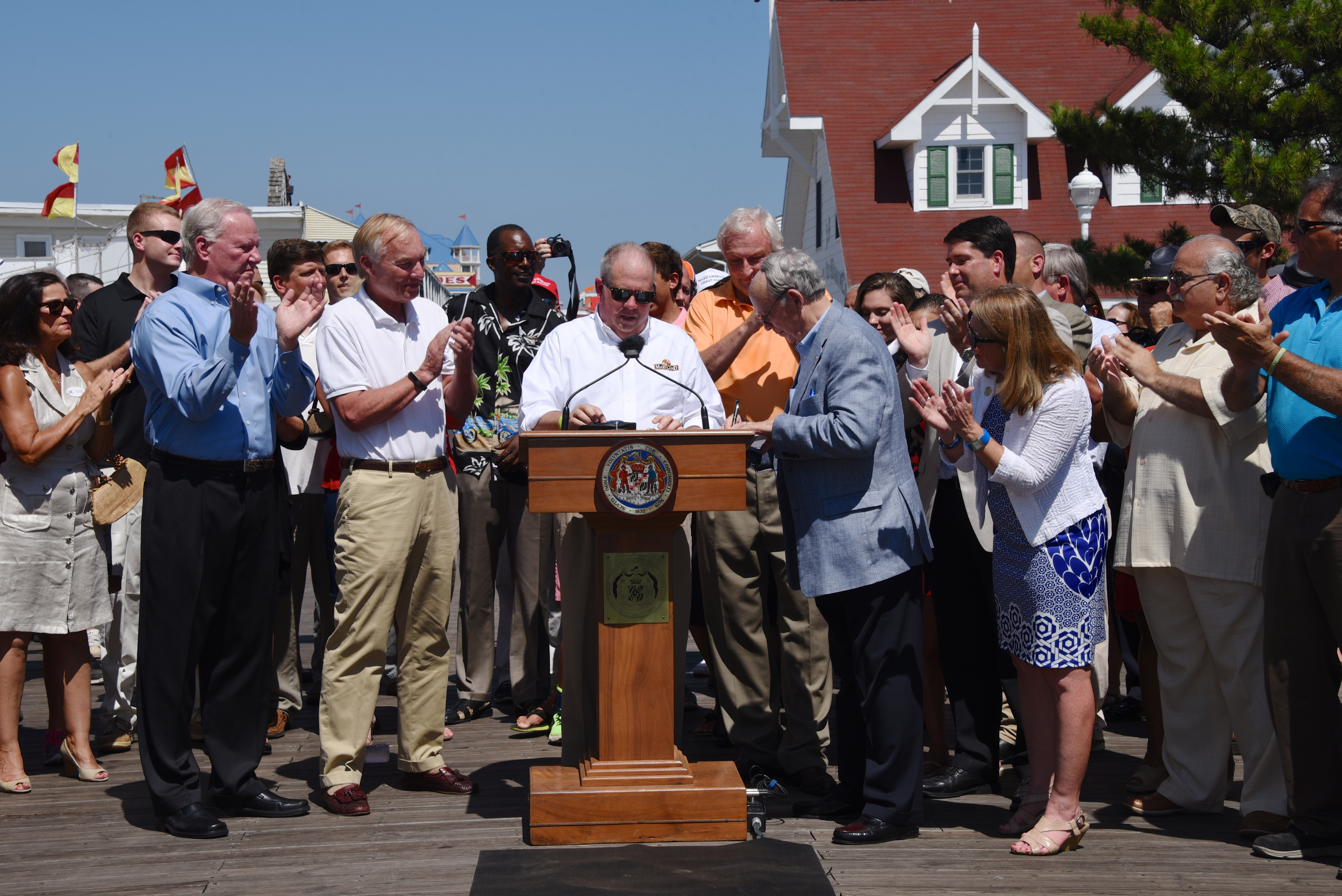
Hogan as he signs an executive order requiring schools to start after Labor Day, August 2016

As governor, Hogan voiced support for expanding charter schools in the state by loosening the state's charter school laws. In February 2015, he announced proposed regulatory changes to the state's charter law, including provisions that would give charter schools more authority over hiring and firing practices and setting admissions criteria, and increasing access to public funding. The Maryland legislature approved and passed a watered-down version of Hogan's proposals, which was signed into law on May 12, 2015. During the 2016 legislative session, Hogan and the Maryland General Assembly agreed to create a state-funded private-school scholarship program to provide assistance to students from low-income families that attend charter schools. In December 2016, Hogan proposed doubling funding for the state program. In 2017, he again proposed changes to the state's charter laws, which was met with pushback from legislative leaders and teacher unions.

In 2013, a bipartisan commission studied whether to move the start of the school year after Labor Day and voted 12–3 to recommend such a measure to then Governor Martin O'Malley. In August 2016, Hogan issued an executive order to set the public schools start date after Labor Day. The measure was opposed by the state teachers' union, the Maryland State Education Association (MSEA).

In early 2017, Hogan proposed a budget that cut funding for community revitalization programs, extended library hours, and public schools in Baltimore City. Under the proposed budget, Baltimore City Public Schools would receive $42 million less than the prior year, further exacerbating the $129 million budget gap. In February 2017, in response to the funding crisis, citizens rallied in Annapolis. Hogan has criticized the school system for the mismanagement of funds, and has deemed the system's finances an "absolute disaster". In January 2019, he released a budget that focused mostly on education funding, above what current state formulas require.

In May 2018, Hogan signed a bill appropriating $15 million in need-based scholarships for low- and middle-income students, allowing them to attend community college tuition-free, and appropriating an additional $2 million over a five-year period for older "near-completer" college students who are close to earning degrees at community colleges or four-year colleges.

In August 2019, Hogan said that he would veto any proposed tax increase to pay for the Blueprint for Maryland's Future, a proposed multi-billion-dollar plan to implement a series of education reforms recommended by the Commission on Innovation and Excellence in Education. In May 2020, Hogan vetoed the Blueprint for Maryland's Future, citing the massive hit on Maryland's economy from the COVID-19 pandemic. This veto also blocked the implementation of the Build to Learn Act, a bill that would have provided $2.2 billion in extra funding for school construction that contained a provision preventing it from going into effect until the Kirwan bill became law. On February 12, 2021, the Maryland General Assembly voted to override Hogan's veto of the Kirwan bill. General Assembly leaders also introduced a separate bill to adjust the implementation timeline of the Blueprint to account for Hogan's veto, which passed and became law without Hogan's signature.

==== Environment ====
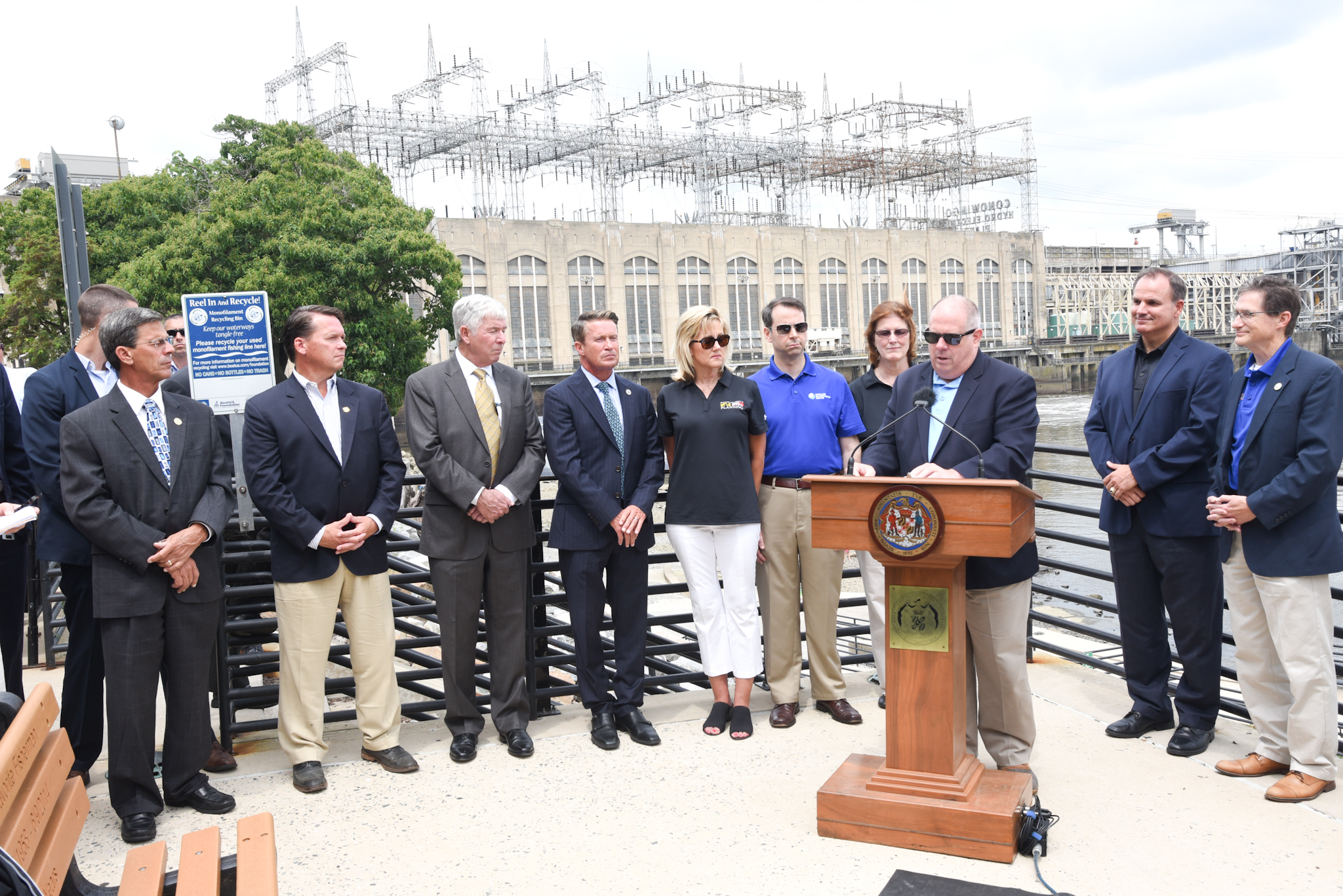
Hogan and administration officials at the Conowingo Dam, 2017

Hogan supports restoration efforts in the Chesapeake Bay, and said during his 2014 gubernatorial campaign that he would prioritize reducing pollution in the Susquehanna River to improve the bay's quality and proposed environmental lawsuits against Pennsylvania and New York to reduce upstream sediment pollution. He also said that he would "stand up" for farmers and fishers, who he said were unfairly burdened with regulations passed in Maryland to clean up the Chesapeake Bay. In February 2015, Hogan proposed a $250 million dredging operation at the Conowingo Dam, which he called an "environmental hazard" due to the build-up of over 170 million tons of sediment caused by the dam, and suggested that Exelon (who owns the Conowingo Dam) should be responsible for covering the costs of the operation. In August 2017, Hogan announced a pilot program to remove 25,000 yards (75,000 ft) of sediment from the Conowingo Dam. In October 2019, the Hogan administration reached an agreement with Exelon that would have the energy company invest $200 million in environmental projects around the Susquehanna River and Conowingo Dam, but did not require the company to remove any of the sediment built up by the dam.

In February 2015, Hogan announced proposed regulatory changes on phosphorus nutrient pollution in the Chesapeake Bay and the Eastern Shore of Maryland. The water was being polluted as a result of agricultural runoff of chicken manure, which farmers use as fertilizer and is cheap and plentiful in Maryland. Hogan proposed extending the time for about 80% of farmers to fully comply with regulations to 2022, while at the same time imposing a ban on additional phosphorus use by the largest farmers and providing for indefinite delays if there was no other use for the manure. In March 2015, Hogan reached a compromise with Democrats in the General Assembly under which a hard date of 2022 was established, subject to a delay to 2024 if no alternative uses for the manure can be found. The compromise "received tentative praise from both the agricultural community and environmentalists."

In 2016, Hogan signed legislation to reauthorize greenhouse gas reduction targets and mandate a 40% reduction in statewide carbon pollution by 2030. In 2017, Hogan vetoed legislation passed by the Maryland General Assembly to increase the use of renewable energy by setting a renewable portfolio standard to require that 25% of the state's electricity come from renewable sources (such as solar, wind, and hydroelectricity) by 2020. Hogan and the Maryland Republican Party led an unsuccessful campaign to sustain the veto, but the Democratic-controlled General Assembly overrode it on party lines. In April 2022, Hogan refused to veto or sign a bill that accelerated these efforts, allowing the bill to become law without his signature.

As a candidate, Hogan called fracking opportunities in western Maryland "an economic gold mine" and faulted the state for taking too long to decide whether to allow drilling for oil. In May 2015, he allowed a bill to impose a two-and-a-half year moratorium on hydraulic fracking in Maryland to become law without his signature. In April 2017, Hogan signed a law banning hydraulic fracturing in Maryland. Despite supporting a fracking ban, Hogan also supported pipelines in Maryland that transport natural gas obtained by hydraulic fracturing in other states, including the Eastern Shore Pipeline.

In June 2017, Hogan maintained support for the climate agreement and opposed the United States withdrawal from the Paris Agreement. In January 2018, he said Maryland would join the United States Climate Alliance formed by California, New York, and Washington.

In November 2021, the Maryland League of Conservation Voters deemed Hogan's environmental leadership inconsistent in its annual legislative scorecard.

In March 2022, Hogan threatened to veto the Climate Solutions Now Act, an omnibus bill to reduce greenhouse gas emissions by 60% by 2031, calling it a "reckless and controversial energy tax", even though the bill contained no tax increases. The bill passed and became law without his signature.

==== Transportation ====
The Baltimore Red Line light rail project (pictured in map) was canceled by Governor Hogan in June 2015.

In June 2015, Hogan canceled the federally funded Baltimore Red Line project, instead choosing to reallocate money to road construction across Maryland, fulfilling a 2014 campaign promise. Maryland Transportation Secretary Pete Rahn called the Red Line proposal "fatally flawed" and argued that the light rail line would not connect with other public transportation hubs in Baltimore and would require the construction of a $1 billion tunnel through the heart of the city. But plans detailed that the Red Line would connect to the MARC Train at the West Baltimore station and planned Bayview station, the Baltimore Metro Subway at Charles Center station via a pedestrian tunnel, as well as with the Baltimore Light Rail at the University Center/Baltimore Street station at street level. Baltimore Mayor Stephanie Rawlings-Blake criticized the project's cancellation. In May 2022, Hogan vetoed bills that would establish a Baltimore-based regional transit board and to fund a new study of the Red Line project.

Hogan conditionally approved funding for the Purple Line in Maryland's Washington, D.C. suburbs, subject to increased contributions from Montgomery County and Prince George's County. This 2017 decision closed down popular bike paths in Montgomery County for what the state Department of Transportation estimates will be five years (ending in 2022), triggering residents' anger and protests.

In 2016, the Maryland General Assembly introduced HB 1013, the Maryland Open Transportation Investment Decision Act of 2016, which aimed to establish statewide transportation goals through a transparent scoring process by the Maryland Department of Transportation. Inspired by Hogan's decision to cancel the Baltimore Red Line and shift funding to rural areas of the state, the legislation would require the Transportation Department to develop a project-based scoring system and promulgate regulations for the public. In April 2016, Hogan vetoed the bill, saying that it was politically motivated and would increase the cancellation risk for major transportation projects throughout the state. He said that the bill would force him to cancel 66 transportation projects and called it the "Road Kill Bill". Hogan did not explain why he considered the measure politically motivated. A prior investigation by the U.S. Department of Transportation revealed that the decision to cancel the red line was made unilaterally by his office without consulting the Maryland Department of Transportation. The General Assembly overrode Hogan's veto on April 8, 2016. Hogan deemed repealing the legislation to be his top priority, but gridlock and tension between him and the legislature prevented an alternative solution from being reached. In May 2019, The Baltimore Sun reported that transit advocates had accused the Hogan administration of using a biased scoring process in which administration-supported projects (such as the Beltway expansion plan) receive high scores and disfavored ones (such as the Baltimore Red Line) receive low scores. One critic cited in the piece said, "The General Assembly passed this law in an attempt to be more open and transparent...MDOT has complied with the law to the minimum extent possible...Projects they want to fund get perfect scores and projects they don't want to fund get low scores. It doesn't pass the smell test that they're faithfully executing this law."

During his second term, Hogan made efforts to expand the Maryland sections of the Capital Beltway (Interstate 495) and Interstate 270 by proposing a plan to add up to two high-occupancy toll lanes (referred to critically as "Lexus lanes") on each highway in each direction, arguing that the project would reduce traffic congestion. The proposal was highly controversial, and was opposed by a number of planners and officials, including the Prince George's County Council, Montgomery County Executive Marc Elrich, and local citizens' organizations such as Citizens Against Beltway Expansion. The only poll on the subject of the Beltway expansion plan showed that in principle, 61% support the toll road, but 73% were very or somewhat concerned about the loss of homes, 69% very or somewhat concerned that the road would be too expensive to use, and 68% were very or somewhat concerned that the new highway would not reduce congestion. The plan's cost also rose from $9 billion to $11 billion since it was first made public, an amount that the Hogan administration said would be paid for entirely by private contractors.

On May 8, 2019, the Prince George's County Council voted unanimously for a proposal requiring Hogan to undertake further environmental reviews before proceeding with the plan. On June 5, the State Board of Public Works (composed of Hogan, State Comptroller Peter Franchot, and State Treasurer Nancy Kopp) voted to approve the proposal. Hogan and Franchot voted in favor of it, Kopp against.

In August 2021, the Maryland Board of Public Works voted to accept a contract that would allow an international consortium to begin design work on the plan to add privately financed toll lanes to portions of the Beltway and I-270, with Hogan and Franchot voting to approve the plans and Kopp voting against it. A second contract, which set up a one-dollar-a-year lease arrangement over 60 years between the Maryland Department of Transportation and the Maryland Transportation Authority, was also agreed upon. On November 19, 2021, the Maryland Transportation Authority Board voted unanimously to approve toll rates on Interstate 270, with prices depending on whether drivers use EZ-Pass or video tolling, the driver's vehicle and amount of passengers, and if drivers commute during hours where traffic is especially acute.

Some consider these decisions contradictory to Hogan's stated support for the Paris Climate accord. He has also been accused of seeking to advance his business interests through his position.

==== COVID-19 pandemic ====
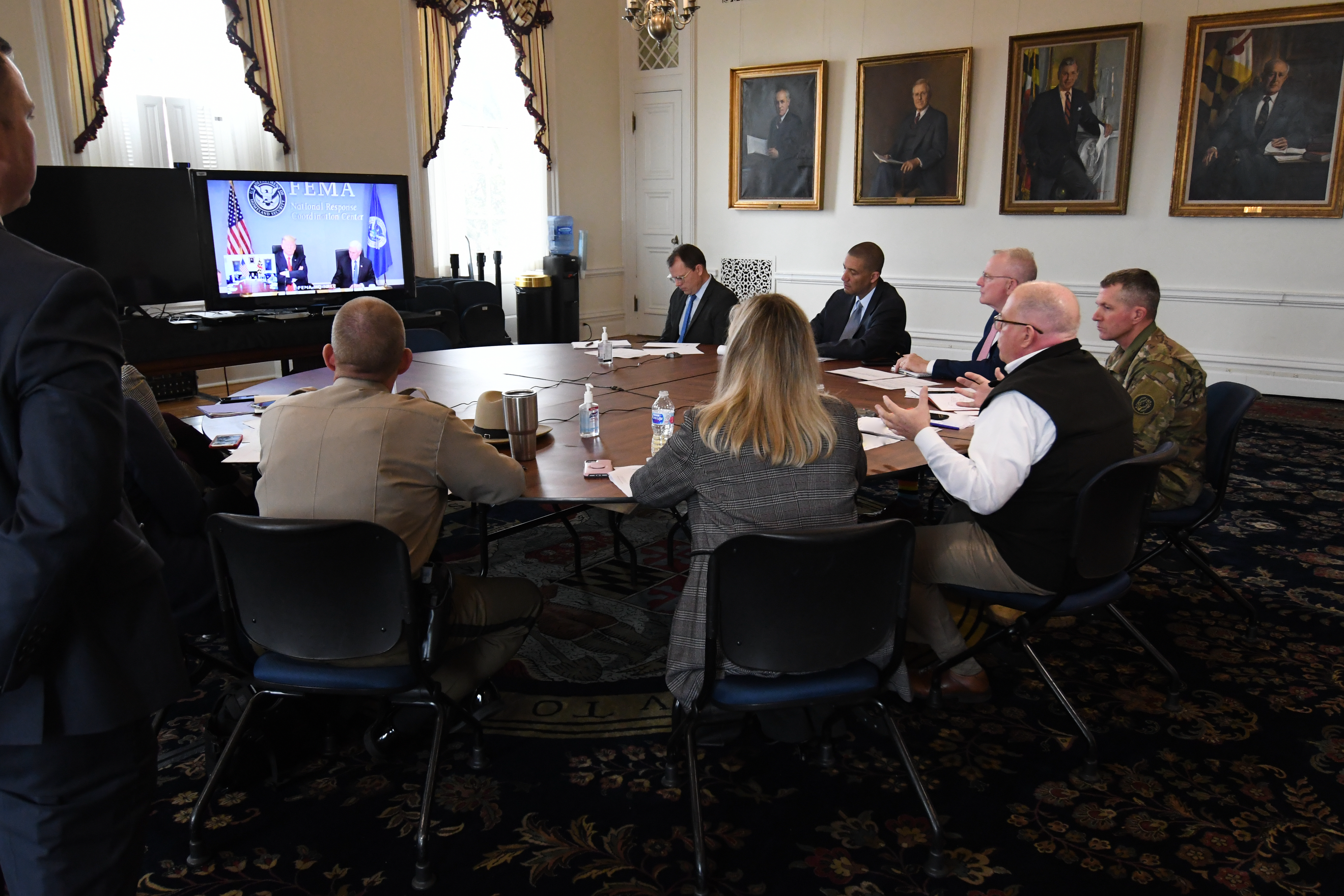
Hogan meets with White House officials on the COVID-19 pandemic, March 2020

Hogan declared a state of emergency on March 5, 2020, after three Montgomery County residents tested positive for COVID-19. The emergency declaration allowed public health experts and emergency management officials to coordinate more with state and local leaders to handle the virus. Hogan also filed a supplemental budget requesting $10 million to fund an emergency response to the virus. The Maryland Senate unanimously approved Hogan's budget request on March 12, 2020.

On March 12, 2020, Hogan ordered the closure of all public schools in the state starting March 16 and ending March 27 to allow for the cleaning and disinfecting of school buildings to prevent the virus's spread. He signed an executive order activating the Maryland Army National Guard and moving the Maryland Emergency Management Agency's activation level to its highest level of readiness, and another prohibiting all social, community, religious, recreational and sports gatherings of more than 250 people in close proximity. He mandated remote work by all nonessential state employees, directed hospitals to adopt new visitor policies, suspended visits at state prisons, limited public access to state buildings, and closed all senior living facilities until the state was no longer under a state of emergency. Hogan signed another executive order a few days later ordering the closure of all Maryland casinos, racetracks, and simulcast betting facilities until the state of emergency expired.

As cases continued to rise, Hogan signed another executive order suspending on-site bar and restaurant services, closing movie theaters and gyms, and banning gatherings of more than 50 people. Non-compliant businesses and individuals were fined $5,000 or received a year in jail. From March 23 to April 19, Hogan signed a series of executive orders aimed at reducing the virus's spread, including an eviction and utility shut-off moratorium, closures of nonessential businesses, a stay-at-home order, and an extension for all expiring identity documents. He used coronavirus "strike teams", made up of the National Guard, state and local health departments and hospital systems, to provide emergency care, supplies and equipment to nursing homes to combat coronavirus case outbreaks.

As hospitalization rates began to stabilize, Hogan announced that the state would begin formulating a plan to roll back coronavirus restrictions and gradually reopen the economy, beginning with a mask mandate on April 15, 2020. On April 24, he unveiled the state's three-stage plan for reopening the state's economy, with the first step involving lifting the state's stay-at-home order. Hogan lifted the stay-at-home order on May 13, after a two-week decline in hospitalizations statewide, and continued the rest of the state's first stage of reopening on May 27. He began the second stage of reopening on June 5, by reopening certain businesses and personal services at 50% capacity.

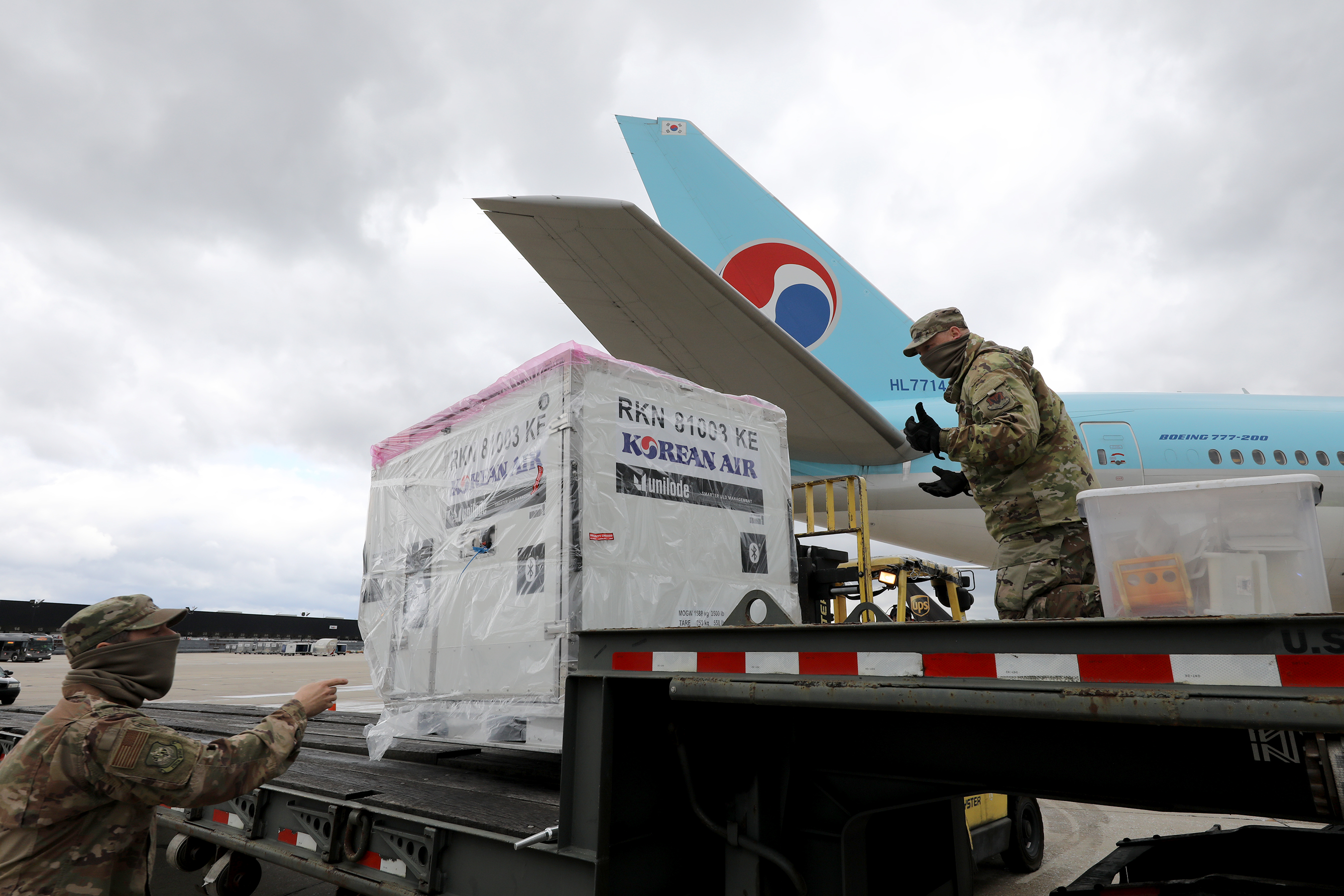
COVID-19 tests imported from South Korea through Operation Enduring Friendship, April 2020

On April 20, 2020, Hogan announced that the state had brokered a $10 million deal with South Korea to acquire 500,000 COVID-19 tests after weeks of negotiations in a confidential project called Operation Enduring Friendship. Upon their delivery, he deployed members of the state's National Guard and the state police to supervise the testing kits at an "undisclosed location" after reports of federal officials seizing supplies delivered to other states. Citing apparent reliability problems, the University of Maryland lab in Baltimore stopped using these test kits in September 2020, replacing the tests with ones developed by the U.S. Centers for Disease Control and Prevention. It was later revealed that the acquired tests had been flawed and were left unused, which led the Hogan administration to acquire 500,000 replacement tests from the same company it had originally purchased test kits from for $2.5 million. Acting Maryland Secretary of Health Dennis Schrader acknowledged the Hogan administration's replacement of its test kits in December 2020. In May 2021, Hogan vetoed a bill that would create greater transparency in emergency procurements that had passed the state House of Delegates and the Senate in a 131–1 and 47–0 vote, respectively. An audit conducted by the Maryland Office of Legislative Audits found that over $190 million in pandemic-related emergency purchases made by state agencies, including the procurement of the South Korean company LabGenomics test kits, lacked appropriate records.

In July 2020, as hospitalization rates began to rise again, Hogan issued a new statewide mask mandate, advised Maryland residents against traveling to states with a positivity rate of 10% or higher, and extended the state's eviction and utility shut-off moratorium. On August 27, he announced that he had authorized every county school board system to begin safely reopening schools, citing improved coronavirus metrics. A few days later, he announced that the state would proceed with the third stage of its reopening plan on September 4 by reopening casinos, theaters, and concert venues. Hogan gave 16 community colleges a $10 million grant in September 2020 to assist people impacted by the pandemic, and later unveiled a $500 million economic relief package to help Maryland business owners recover.

Hogan renewed the state's coronavirus state of emergency declaration on October 31 and its state travel advisories on November 5, 2020, after a sudden increase in COVID-19 cases across the state. He also reintroduced capacity restrictions in public spaces and buildings in order to reduce the virus's spread. As Maryland reached 200,000 confirmed COVID-19 cases, Hogan activated the Maryland Medical Reserve Corps and allowed medical and nursing students to help staff the state's testing and vaccination sites. He later implemented new gathering and travel restrictions as cases continued to soar.

Locations of state-run mass vaccination sites in Maryland

On December 8, 2020, Hogan announced that Maryland would receive its first batch of COVID-19 vaccines by December 14 and laid out a four-phase plan for who would receive the first doses. His administration opened mass vaccination sites across the state, starting with Six Flags America and the Baltimore Convention Center in February 2021. Hogan opened 12 mass vaccination sites by the end of April 2021 and worked with the Federal Emergency Management Agency to deploy the first federal mobile COVID-19 vaccination sites on the Eastern Shore of Maryland. In February 2021, Hogan signed into law a bill providing tax relief for families and businesses struggling with the pandemic and distributing direct payments of $500 to families and $300 to low-income individuals.

Hogan signed an executive order lifting the state's restrictions on restaurants, retail businesses, religious facilities, casinos, and social gatherings on March 12, 2021, but kept social distancing and mask mandate requirements in place. A few weeks later, he announced plans to initiate the start of the final phases of Maryland's vaccine distribution plan, with the second stage starting on March 30 and the third stage on April 27, 2021. Hogan signed an executive order lifting the outdoor mask mandate and dining restrictions on April 28, 2021, and lifted all remaining COVID-19 related restrictions on May 15. On June 15, he announced that he would not renew the state's coronavirus emergency declaration when it expired on July 1. He later signed a proclamation keeping the conditions of the emergency declaration in place through August 15, 2021.

On June 1, 2021, Hogan announced that on July 3 he would join two dozen other Republican governors in ending the $300 supplemental weekly unemployment insurance provided by the American Rescue Plan Act of 2021. A judge temporarily halted the Hogan administration's plans to end unemployment benefits early before eventually blocking the decision altogether. The Maryland Court of Appeals dismissed Hogan's appeal of the ruling, and Circuit Court Judge Lawrence Fletcher-Hill issued a preliminary injunction blocking the Hogan administration from terminating federal unemployment assistance.

In August 2021, Hogan issued a vaccine mandate requiring all hospital and nursing home workers to get a COVID-19 vaccine by September 1, 2021, or receive weekly testing.

In September 2021, Hogan authorized COVID-19 booster shots for nursing home residents and immunocompromised residents. In November 2021, booster shot eligibility was expanded to all Maryland adults.

==== Roy McGrath ====
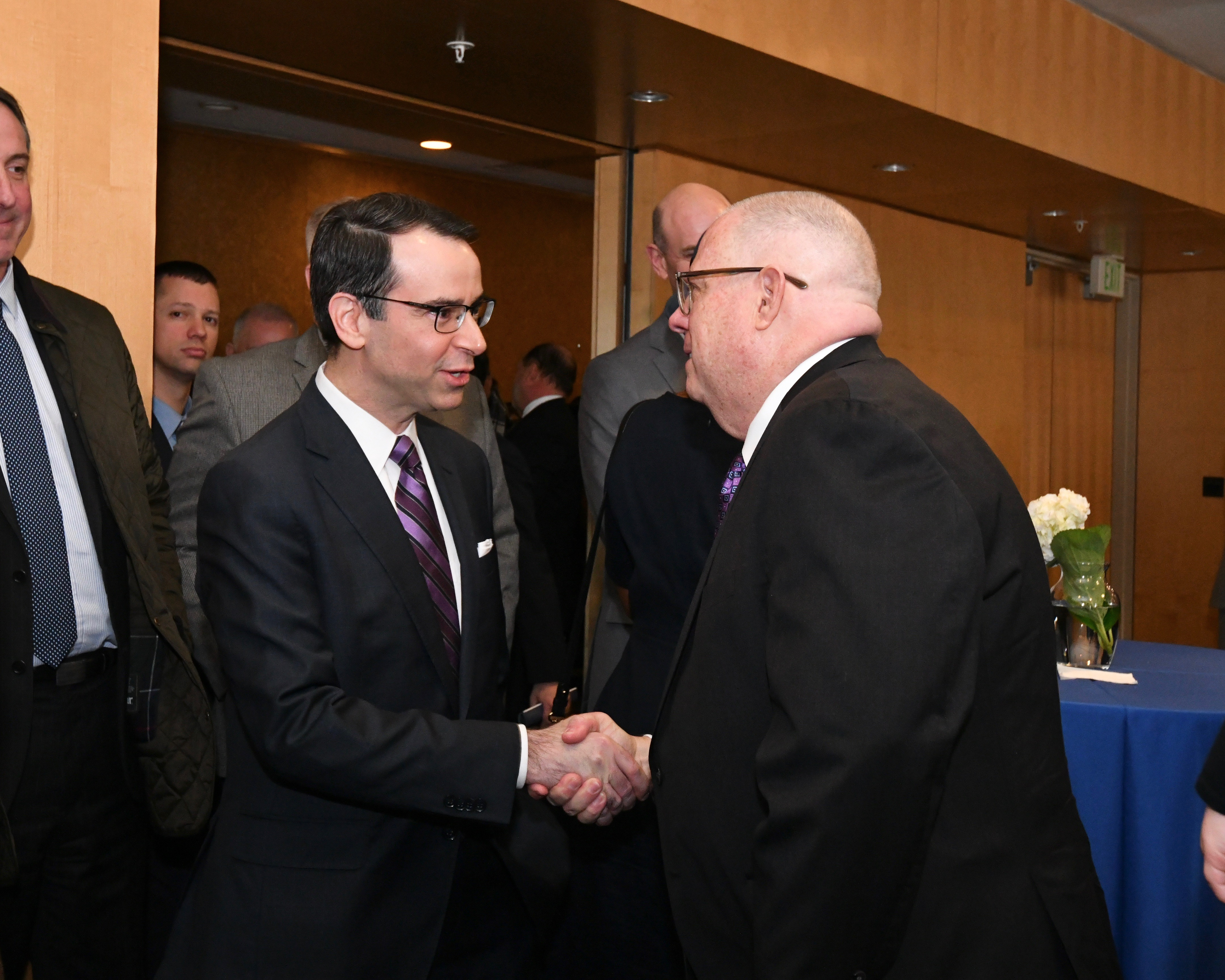
Hogan with Roy McGrath, 2019

Roy McGrath was Hogan's chief of staff for two months in 2020, until The Baltimore Sun broke news of a $233,647 severance he received in 2020 upon leaving the Maryland Environmental Service to take the chief of staff position. According to an affidavit obtained by the Baltimore Banner, Hogan was alerted of the payout during a phone call with his lawyer on August 2nd, 2020. He called McGrath into his office the next day to discuss the payout, but did not take any action until The Sun article was released. Hogan maintained that he did not know about the severance payment, and ordered an audit of the Maryland Environmental Service following his resignation. McGrath was facing wire fraud and embezzlement charges when he became a fugitive after failing to show up to federal court in a Baltimore trial wherein Hogan was to be called as a witness. McGrath died on April 3, 2023 by simultaneously shooting himself and being shot by an FBI agent during a confrontation in Knoxville, Tennessee.

==== Gun control ====
During his 2014 gubernatorial campaign, Hogan said he opposed the Firearm Safety Act of 2013, which placed restrictions on firearm purchases and magazine capacity in semi-automatic rifles, but supported background checks on firearm purchases and banning assault weapons.

In October 2018, a law tightening gun control regulations that Hogan signed went into effect. The law banned bump stocks and gun ownership by convicted domestic abusers. Hogan was endorsed by the NRA Political Victory Fund (NRA) in 2014, but in July 2018, he said he would decline an endorsement and funds from the NRA if they were offered. In September 2018, the NRA downgraded its rating of Hogan to "C" and declined to endorse him.

On May 24, 2019, Hogan vetoed a bill to replace the state Handgun Permit Review Board with a panel of judges. The Handgun Permit Review Board heard appeals from Marylanders whose applications for handgun permits were denied by the Maryland State Police. Critics accused it of being too lenient in granting appeals. Hogan condemned the bill as a "solution in search of a problem."

In April 2022, Hogan refused to veto or sign a bill that would ban the sale and possession of privately made firearms, allowing the bill to become law without his signature. He vetoed legislation that would require gun shops to have increased safety measures, including 24-hour burglary alarm systems and anti-vehicle barriers. The General Assembly overrode Hogan's veto the next day.

In July 2022, Hogan directed the Maryland State Police to end the "good and substantial" reasoning standard when issuing carry permits. The order was issued a few weeks after the U.S. Supreme Court declared a similar provision in New York unconstitutional in NYSRPA v. Bruen.

==== Immigration ====
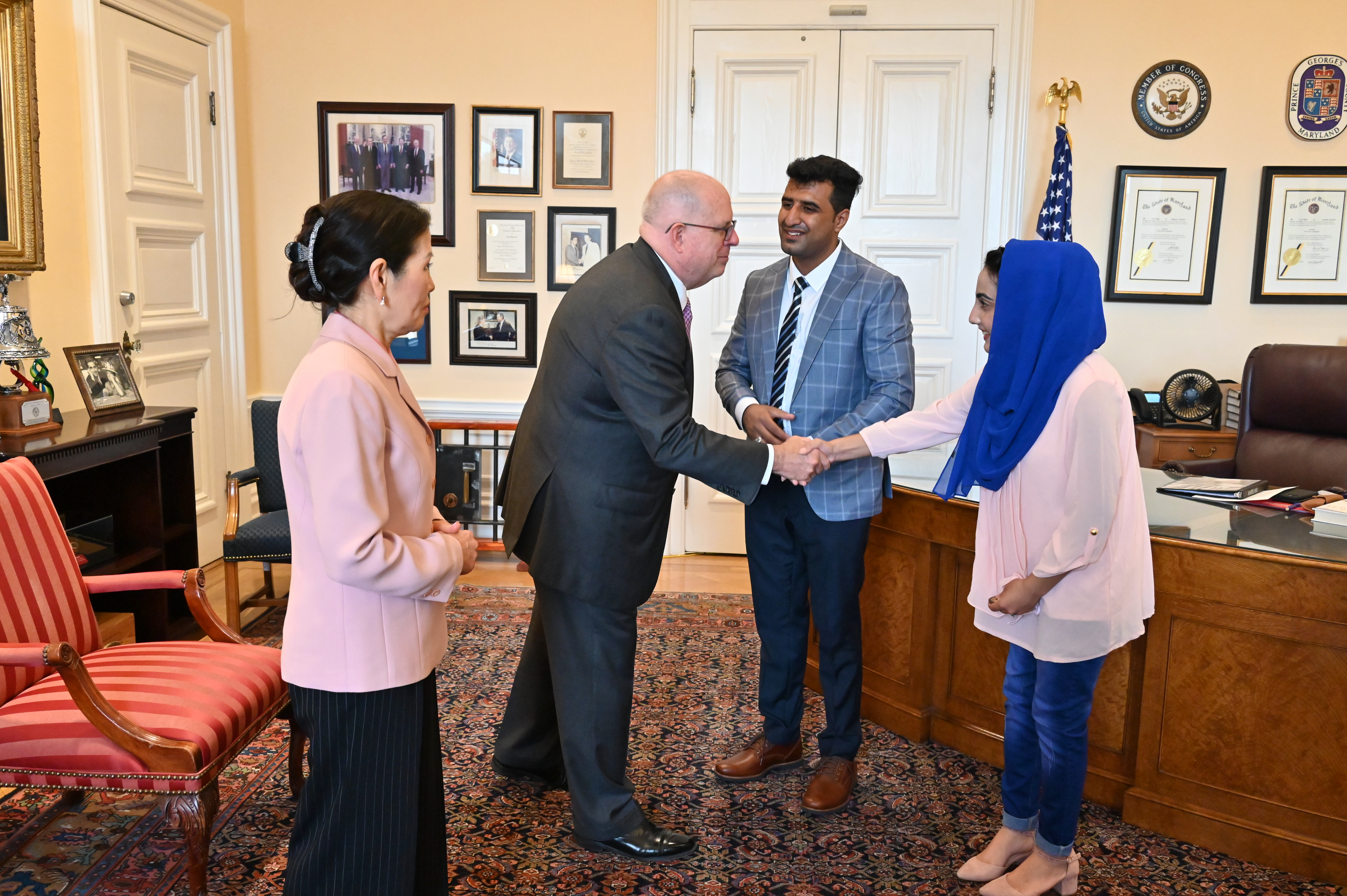
Hogan meeting resettled Afghan interpreters in 2021

During his 2014 gubernatorial campaign, Hogan said he opposed "open-border policies" and supported returning undocumented immigrants living in Maryland back to their countries of origin "as quickly as possible".

After the November 2015 Paris attacks, Hogan asked that the federal government "cease any additional settlement programs of Syrian refugees in Maryland until the U.S. government can provide appropriate assurances that refugees from Syria pose no threat to public safety." He opposed President Donald Trump's decision to end the Deferred Action for Childhood Arrivals (DACA) program. He recalled Maryland National Guard forces from the U.S.–Mexico border to protest the Trump administration family separation policy.

In May 2021, Hogan vetoed a bill passed by the General Assembly that would require counties that have contracts with Immigration and Customs Enforcement to end their contracts by October 1, 2022. The General Assembly overrode the veto during its 2021 special session.

In August 2021, Hogan announced that Maryland would be "ready and willing" to accept additional Afghan refugees. The state took in 1,348 Afghan refugees amid their evacuation.

==== Israel ====
Hogan is pro-Israel. In October 2017, Hogan signed an executive order requiring firms that have state contracts to promise they will not boycott Israel. In January 2019, the Council on American-Islamic Relations sued Hogan and Attorney General Brian Frosh on behalf of Saqib Ali, a former member of the House of Delegates, challenging the executive order under the First and Fourteenth Amendments to the United States Constitution. In October 2020, U.S. District Judge Catherine Blake refused to block the executive order. In a debate hosted by NBC for the Maryland senate race in 2024, against Angela Alsobrooks, Hogan considered supporting Palestine to be "both-sideism".

==== Policing and criminal justice ====
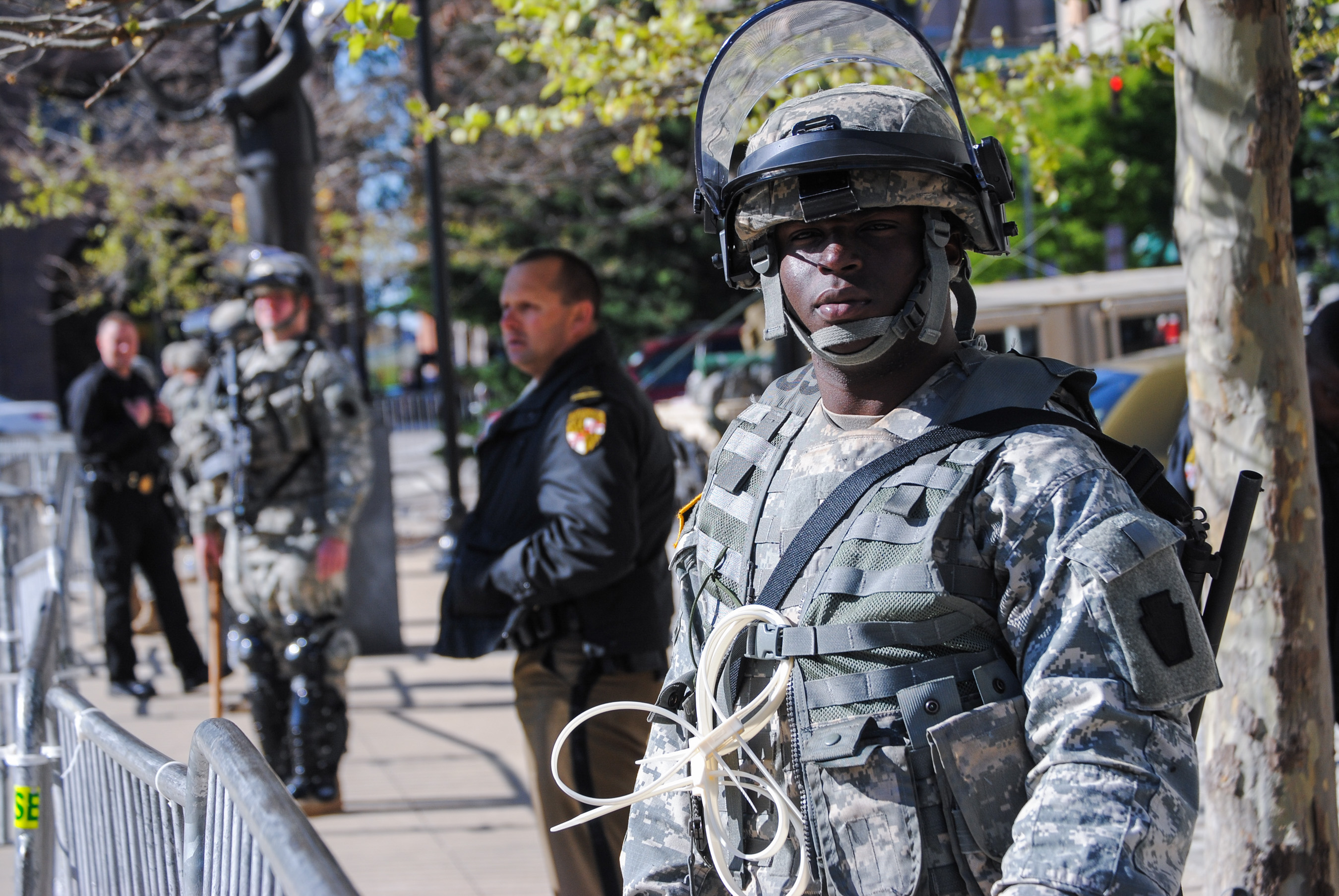
A Maryland National Guard soldier in front of Baltimore City Hall, April 28, 2015

The April 2015 death of Freddie Gray, a 25-year-old African American man, in Baltimore Police Department custody led to a wave of protests. After violent clashes broke out, Hogan declared a state of emergency and activated the Maryland National Guard. Several thousand National Guard troops, Maryland State Police troopers, and others were eventually deployed in Baltimore to quell violence.

In July 2015, Hogan announced the closure of the Baltimore City Detention Center. The center had a long record of poor conditions and dysfunction. He did not notify Baltimore City mayor Stephanie Rawlings-Blake or leaders of the state general assembly of the plan. Civil liberties and reform groups such as the American Civil Liberties Union, Public Justice Center, and Justice Policy Institute supported Hogan's move. The last prisoners were moved out of the jail in late August 2015.

In 2016, Hogan reopened the Maryland State Police Barrack in Annapolis, which had closed in 2008 as a cost-saving measure.

In September 2019, Hogan directed Attorney General Brian Frosh to prosecute more violent crime cases in Baltimore City. He said that the city's justice system was too lenient, citing an example of someone who had a pending murder charge but was set free. Marilyn Mosby, the State's Attorney for Baltimore, disputed Hogan's characterization of the city's justice system. Hogan authorized state police helicopters to fly over Baltimore City and ordered an increase in the enforcement of outstanding warrants.

Hogan vetoed legislation passed by the Maryland General Assembly in 2015 to restore the voting rights of persons convicted of felonies following their completion of prison sentences. The General Assembly overrode the veto. The law applies to about 44,000 former prisoners.

In 2021, Hogan vetoed bills that would "raise the bar for officers to use force; give civilians a role in police discipline for the first time; restrict no-knock warrants; mandate body cameras; and open some allegations of police wrongdoing for public review." The Maryland legislature overrode his vetoes.

In April 2021, Hogan vetoed a bill to abolish life without parole sentences for juvenile offenders. The legislature overrode the veto.

In May 2021, Hogan granted posthumous pardons to 34 victims of racial lynchings in Maryland between the years 1854 and 1933.

In late May 2021, Hogan vetoed a bill that would remove the governor from parole decisions made by the Maryland Parole Commission. The General Assembly overrode his veto during its 2021 special session.

In October 2021, Hogan proposed a $150 million "Re-Fund the Police" initiative aimed at increasing support for the state's law enforcement agencies and victims of violent crime. The Maryland General Assembly approved a state budget containing the initiative with an amendment that would allocate funding in proportion to the number of violent crimes reported in local jurisdictions.

In November 2021, citing a wave of violent crime in Baltimore, Hogan announced that his administration would fast-track and expand the $10 million Neighborhood Safety Grants program to include places of worship and vulnerable communities, and introduced two pieces of legislation aimed at decreasing crime. He also announced that the state would conduct an audit of the Baltimore City State's Attorney's Office, demanding Mosby produce detailed statistics on how often her office dismisses cases or strikes deals with defendants. Senate president Bill Ferguson said that the legislature would not take up Hogan's proposed bills during its 2021 special session.

In April 2022, Hogan vetoed a bill that would require police officers to contact children's parents or guardians and allow them to speak with an attorney before they are interrogated. The General Assembly overrode Hogan's veto the next day.

==== Redistricting ====
In May 2017, Hogan vetoed a bill that would have enacted nonpartisan redistricting in Maryland if New York, New Jersey, Pennsylvania, Virginia, and North Carolina all passed the same deal.

In January 2018, Hogan signed an amicus brief filed by former California Governor Gray Davis in the Supreme Court case Benisek v. Lamone, arguing that Maryland's partisan gerrymandering system violates voters' constitutional rights.

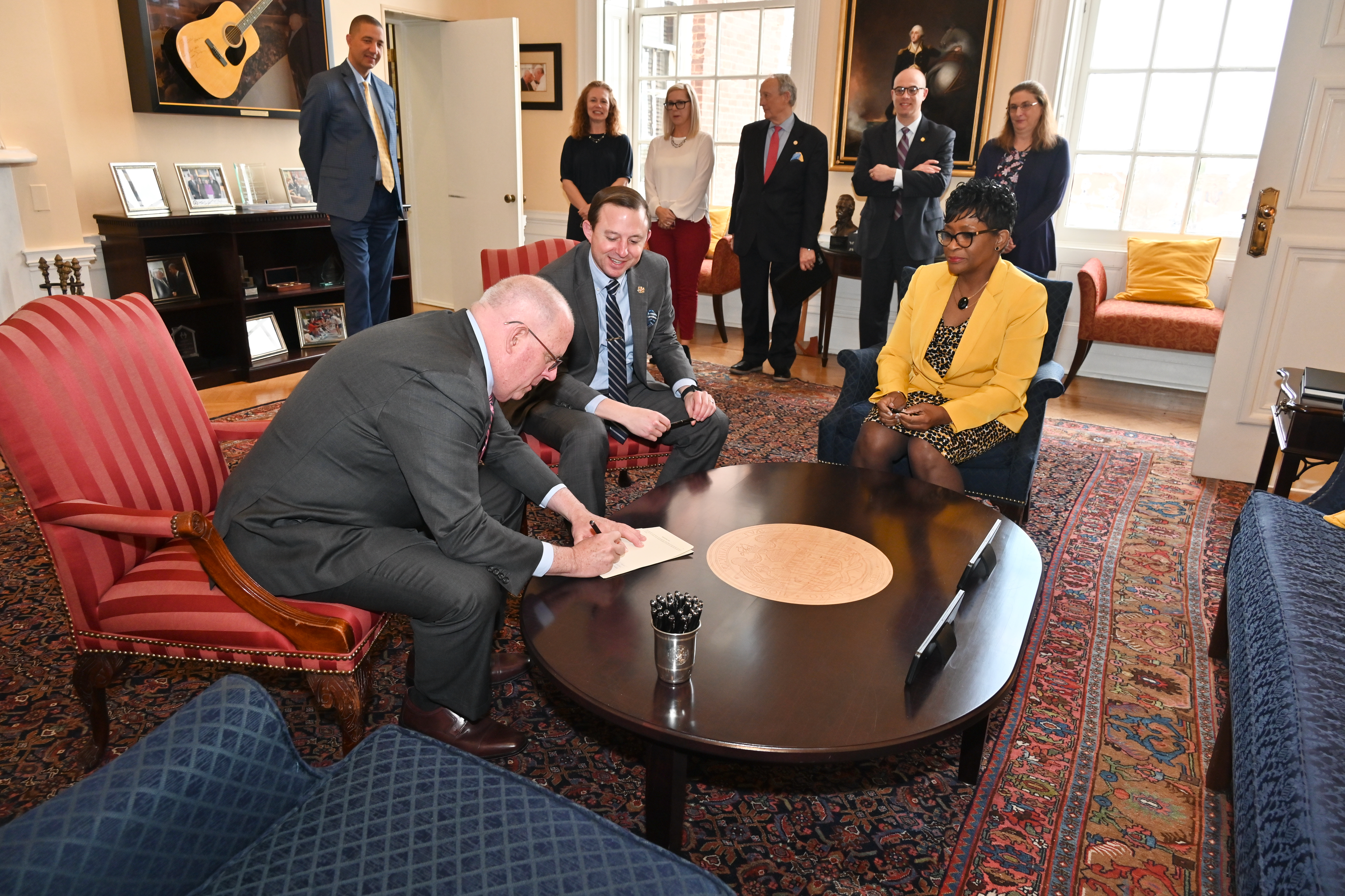
Hogan signs a bill adopting new congressional districts for Maryland on April 4, 2022.

In January 2021, Hogan signed an executive order establishing the Maryland Citizens Redistricting Commission (MCRC), which consisted of three Republicans, three Democrats, and three independent voters, in an effort to resolve a gerrymandering issue in the state. The commission would be in charge of creating legislative maps. It held 36 meetings and opened an online mapping application portal for the public to give input into the redistricting process before submitting its final maps on November 4, 2021. Hogan accepted the commission's final map the following day, sending it to the Maryland General Assembly for consideration during a special session on December 6, 2021. He also threatened a legal battle against any maps the General Assembly passed over his veto that he considered unfair. During its 2021 special session, the House Rules Committee did not vote on the commission's maps, instead passing its own map, drawn by the Legislative Redistricting Advisory Committee (LRAC), by a vote of 18–6. The General Assembly rejected amendments that would have swapped out the LRAC proposal with the maps drawn by the MCRC, and sent its maps to Hogan on December 8. Hogan vetoed the LRAC proposal on December 9. The General Assembly overrode his veto the same day. After Judge Lynne A. Battaglia struck down the legislature's maps in March 2022, Hogan issued a statement celebrating the ruling and calling on the General Assembly to enact the MCRC map. The General Assembly again drew its own map a few days later, which passed and was signed into law by Hogan on April 4, 2022, after legislative leaders dropped their appeal of Battaglia's ruling.

==== Sick-leave and paid family leave ====
In December 2016, Hogan proposed state legislation to require companies with 50 or more employees to provide five days per year of paid sick leave. Hogan's bill was less expansive than legislation passed by the Maryland House of Delegates; it would also have preempted local legislation that was more generous to employees, such as mandated paid sick leave required by Montgomery County, Maryland. In the legislature, Hogan's proposal failed to advance out of committee, and the House of Delegates passed more expansive legislation that requires companies with 15 employees or more to provide seven paid sick-leave days a year, requires companies with fewer than 15 employees to provide five days of unpaid sick leave, and affords benefits for part-time employees. Hogan vetoed the more generous bill, but his veto was overridden.

In April 2022, Hogan vetoed a bill that would provide 12 weeks of partially paid family leave and up to 24 weeks of paid leave for new parents. The General Assembly overrode Hogan's veto the next day.

==== Social issues ====
===== Abortion =====
Hogan personally opposes abortion but has said he "will not try to change Maryland's laws protecting women's rights to the procedure nor to limit access to contraception." Although he commented in opposition to abortion in the early 1980s, he said in the 1990s that abortion should remain legal. In 2016, Hogan signed a law making birth control cheaper. In 2017, the legislature passed a bill to reimburse Planned Parenthood in the event that the federal government withdrew funding, and Hogan allowed the bill to become a law without his signature. He characterized as unnecessary a 2018 initiative Democratic state lawmakers put forward to protect abortion in the Maryland constitution but declined to oppose it, adding that he supported allowing Marylanders to vote on it, which would automatically happen if the General Assembly approved it. "Our laws in Maryland already guarantee a woman's right to choose", he said. "We have some very strong laws and any change in the Supreme Court would not affect Maryland, so I don't think that a constitutional amendment is required, but if that's what they want to do, I'm all for that. Let the voters decide." In April 2022, Hogan vetoed a bill that would expand abortion access by expanding who could perform abortions, such as midwives, in the state. The General Assembly overrode his veto the next day. Despite the override, Hogan withheld funding for training new abortion providers, effectively delaying the state's training program for a year.

===== LGBTQ rights =====
In 2014, Hogan opposed a transgender rights law signed by Governor Martin O'Malley. As a gubernatorial candidate, he said that he was "originally for civil unions" but that he has evolved to support same-sex marriage. In 2015, Hogan expanded an executive order to include protections for gender identity among "executive branch employees." He neither signed nor vetoed a 2015 bill that allowed transgender Marylanders to change the gender listed on their birth certificates, allowing the bill to become law without his signature.

In May 2018, Hogan signed legislation into law making Maryland the 11th state to ban conversion therapy for minors.

In June 2021, Hogan refused to veto or sign a bill banning the use of the gay panic defense and another bill creating the Commission on LGBTQ Affairs in the Governor's Office of Community Initiatives. As a result, both laws went into effect without his signature on October 1, 2021.

===== Marijuana =====
In 2016, Hogan vetoed legislation to decriminalize possession of marijuana paraphernalia in Maryland, making it a civil infraction rather than a crime. The General Assembly overrode the veto. In May 2021, he vetoed a bill the state legislature passed that decriminalized the possession of drug paraphernalia and reduced the maximum penalty for possession from four years in prison and a $25,000 fine to one year's imprisonment and a $1,000 fine. In April 2022, Hogan refused to veto or sign a bill that created a framework for legalizing recreational marijuana, allowing the bill to become law without his signature. The bill was dependent on a constitutional referendum to legalize recreational marijuana that voters approved in the 2022 elections.

==== National politics ====
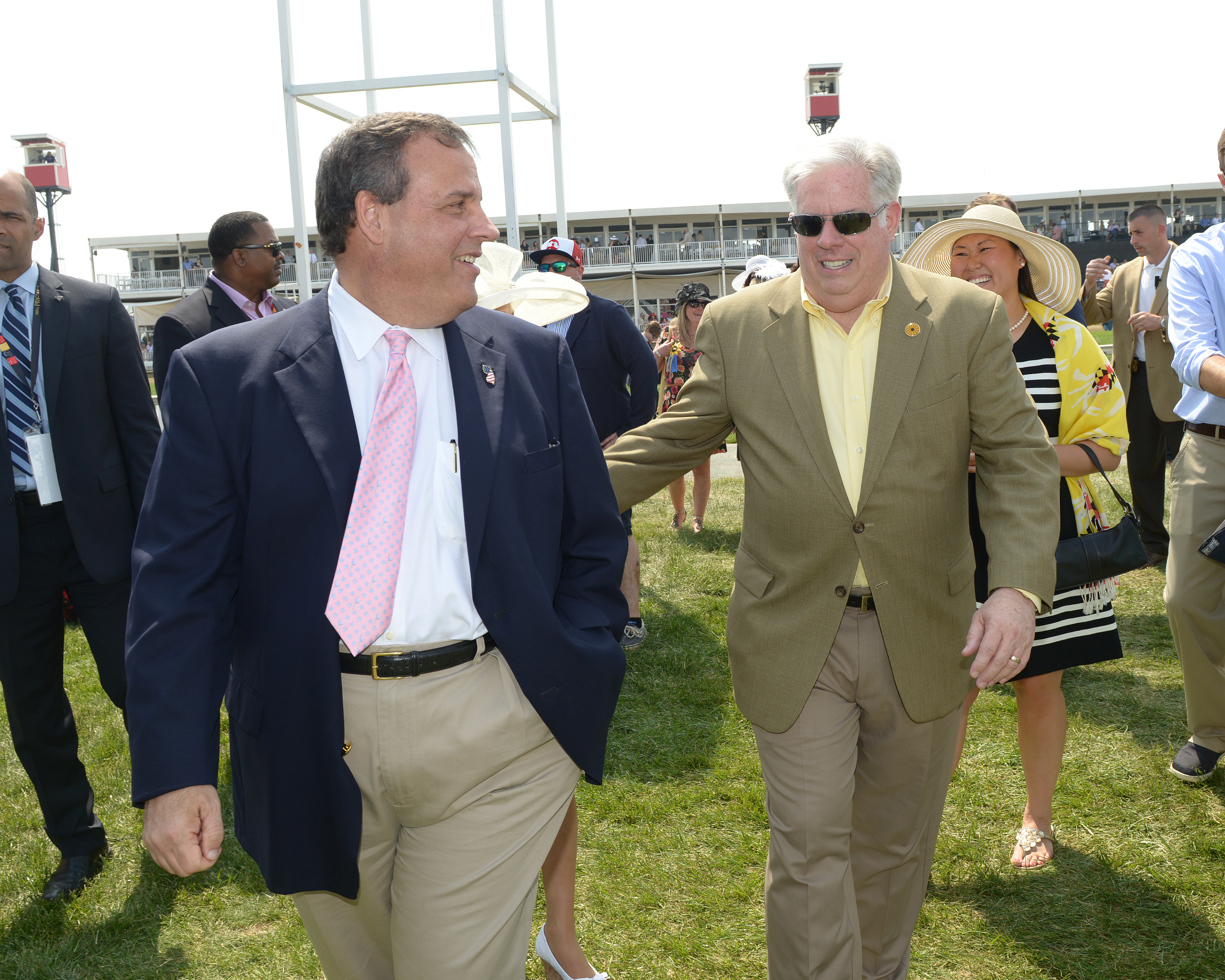
Governor Chris Christie of New Jersey and Hogan at the 2015 Preakness Stakes

On July 15, 2015, Hogan endorsed New Jersey Governor Chris Christie in his campaign for the Republican nomination for president. In June 2016, Hogan said he had no plans to support Donald Trump, the Republican Party's presumptive nominee. Instead, on election day, Hogan wrote in his father, Lawrence Hogan, for president. He later attended Trump's inauguration. During Trump's administration, Hogan mixed criticism of Trump (including a suggestion that the Republican Party should reorient itself away from Trump) with praise for Trump in economic and public health matters.

In his January 2019 inaugural address, Hogan hinted he was considering launching a Republican primary challenge to Trump in the 2020 presidential election. In March 2019, Hogan said he was listening to many who were encouraging him to challenge Trump and would not rule it out. In an April 2019 event in New Hampshire, Hogan said he intended to give "serious consideration" to a primary challenge to Trump. Polls conducted in April and May 2019 suggested Hogan would receive the votes of 24% of Republican voters against 68% for Trump in the Maryland Republican primary. In June 2019, Hogan announced that he would not challenge Trump in the 2020 Republican primaries in order to focus on governing Maryland and chairing the National Governors Association. Shortly afterward, Hogan said he had no interest in running for the U.S. Senate in 2022, but left open the possibility of running for president in 2024. He also launched An America United, a national advocacy group that is also intended to raise Hogan's profile and give him a voice on the national level.

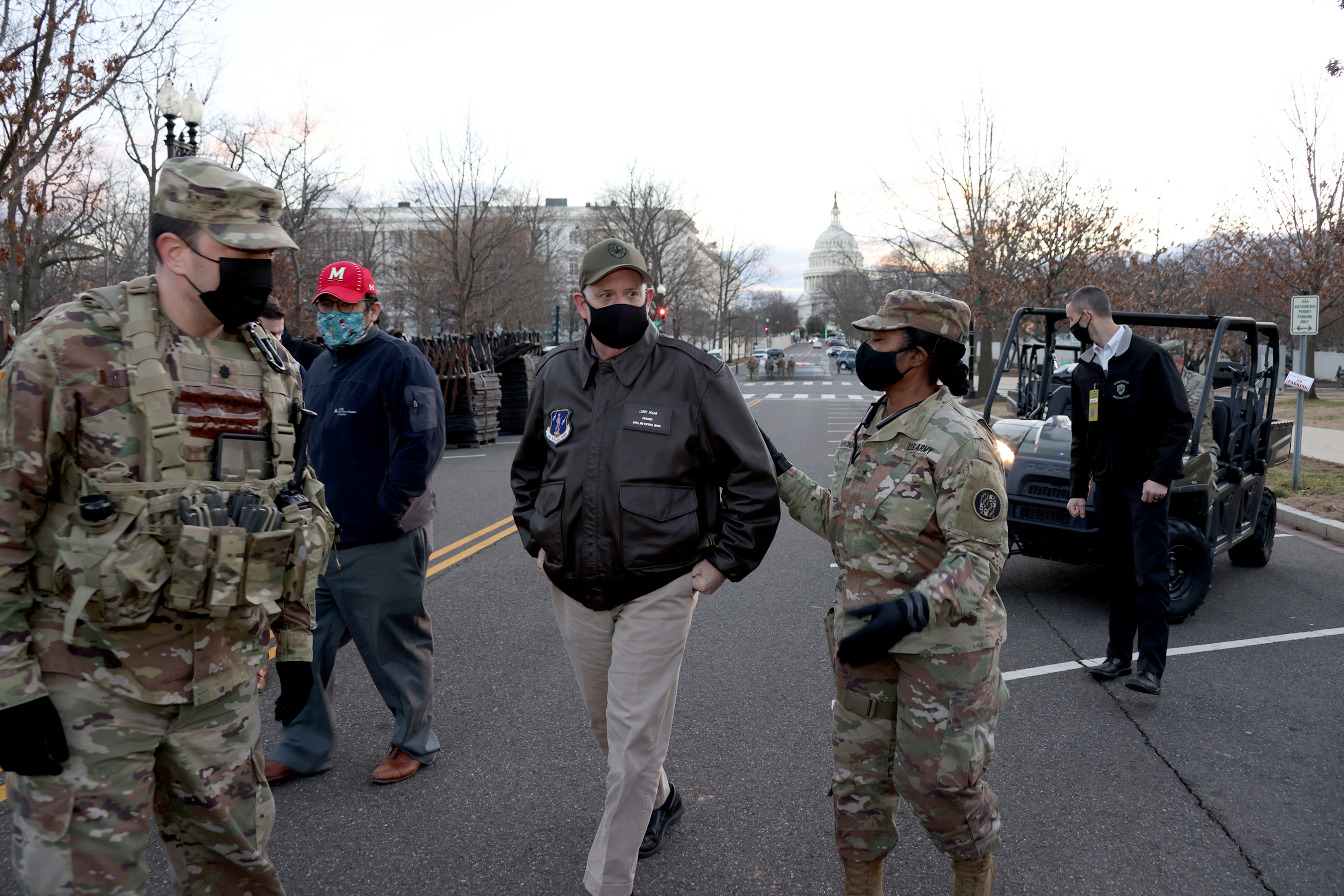
Hogan visiting Maryland Army National Guard troops deployed in Washington, D.C., two days before Joe Biden's presidential inauguration

In October 2019, Hogan announced his support for the U.S. House of Representatives' impeachment inquiry against Trump. In February 2020, after Trump was impeached and acquitted by the Senate, Hogan criticized Congress, saying that House Democrats "had already decided before the hearings that the president should be impeached" and that Senate Republicans were going to acquit Trump "no matter what the facts were". In September 2020, Hogan endorsed U.S. Senator Susan Collins for reelection. In November 2020, he announced his support for Senators David Perdue and Kelly Loeffler in the January 2021 runoff elections in Georgia.

In August 2020, during an interview on the Maryland response to the COVID-19 pandemic, Hogan said that he was unenthusiastic about Trump and the Democratic nominee, Joe Biden, but said it was conceivable that his vote could be swayed by either candidate before election day. He ultimately stated that he wrote in a vote for late President Ronald Reagan.

In December 2020, Hogan was announced as the national co-chair of No Labels, a centrist political organization.

In January 2021, in response to the storming of the U.S. Capitol by a pro-Trump mob, Hogan sent in the Maryland National Guard to protect the Capitol, after initially being denied permission multiple times. Shortly after the attack, Hogan said, "I think there's no question that America would be better off if the president would resign or be removed from office." He supported Trump's impeachment for incitement of insurrection and said that, had he been in the Senate, he would have voted to convict Trump and remove him from office. Hogan later ordered the Maryland National Guard to aid in protecting the inauguration of Biden.

In August 2021, Hogan applauded the passage of the Infrastructure Investment and Jobs Act in the Senate and thanked his Senate partners for including every recommendation the National Governors Association made. He also criticized Trump and other Republicans for targeting the 13 House Republicans who voted for the act.

In November 2021, after the House of Representatives passed the Build Back Better Act, Hogan issued a statement urging the Senate to reject the bill. In August 2024, a Hogan spokesperson told Inside Climate News that he had reservations with the Inflation Reduction Act and would seek to adjust provisions affecting oil and gas production if elected to the U.S. Senate.

During a speech to the Republican Jewish Coalition in November 2022, Hogan complimented Trump's achievements in his first term, including the Tax Cuts and Jobs Act, his U.S. Supreme Court appointments, and policies toward Israel and domestic energy production. After Semafor reported on these remarks in August 2024, a Hogan spokesperson told the news website that Hogan's remarks were in the context of the Supreme Court's ruling in Carson v. Makin, which held that students could not be excluded from scholarships for attending religious-based private schools.

== Post-gubernatorial career ==
Despite initial speculation, Hogan announced in 2023 that he would not seek the Republican nomination for president in 2024. Later, Hogan said he had not ruled out running as a third-party candidate should the 2024 election become a rematch of the 2020 election between Trump and Biden. Such a third-party bid would likely have been as a candidate of No Labels, which Hogan said had "raised about $50 million to get [ballot] access in all 50 states as kind of an insurance policy". At the end of 2023, Hogan resigned as national co-chair of No Labels, a move seen at the time as preparation for a presidential bid. In January 2024, a day before the Iowa caucuses, he endorsed Nikki Haley's presidential campaign.

After Haley suspended her campaign in March 2024, Hogan said that he would not vote for Trump or Biden in the general election, instead saying that he would cast a write-in vote for a candidate to state his dissatisfaction with the modern Republican Party. After Biden withdrew and Kamala Harris became the Democratic nominee, Hogan reiterated that he would not support Trump or Harris. On October 29, 2024, Hogan told CNN that he would not vote for anyone in the presidential election, saying that he "never voted for anybody I didn't believe in". During Trump's second presidency, Hogan said he supported the United States strikes on Iranian nuclear sites and the "premise" of rooting out inefficiencies and waste in government spending, but criticized federal mass layoffs by Elon Musk and the Department of Government Efficiency.

Hogan was seen as a potential candidate in the 2026 Maryland gubernatorial election, with Hogan and Moore publicly clashing over state budget issues and during his U.S. Senate campaign. However, in January 2026, he announced in an op-ed to The Baltimore Sun that he would not run for office again. In May 2026, Hogan founded an eponymous nonpartisan think tank called The Hogan Institute, which aimed to teach leadership skills to Washington College undergraduates.

=== 2024 U.S. Senate campaign ===
On February 9, 2024, Hogan unexpectedly filed to run for U.S. Senate in Maryland, seeking to succeed retiring U.S. Senator Ben Cardin. Hogan had repeatedly denied being interested in running for senator, but changed his mind after many senate Republicans, pressed by former President Donald Trump, voted against a combined border security and foreign aid bill. He also credited former President George W. Bush with finally convincing him to run for senate. Upon entering the race, Hogan immediately became the frontrunner of the Republican primary and made the race more competitive, with The Cook Political Report lowering its rating of the race from "Solid Democrat" to "Likely Democrat".

Hogan won the Republican primary election on May 14, 2024, and faced Prince George's County Executive Angela Alsobrooks in the general election. The Washington Post predicted that the election would "test the endurance of Hogan's popularity" among voters, especially among Democrats, who outnumber registered Republicans 2-to-1 and were key to Hogan's successes in past elections.

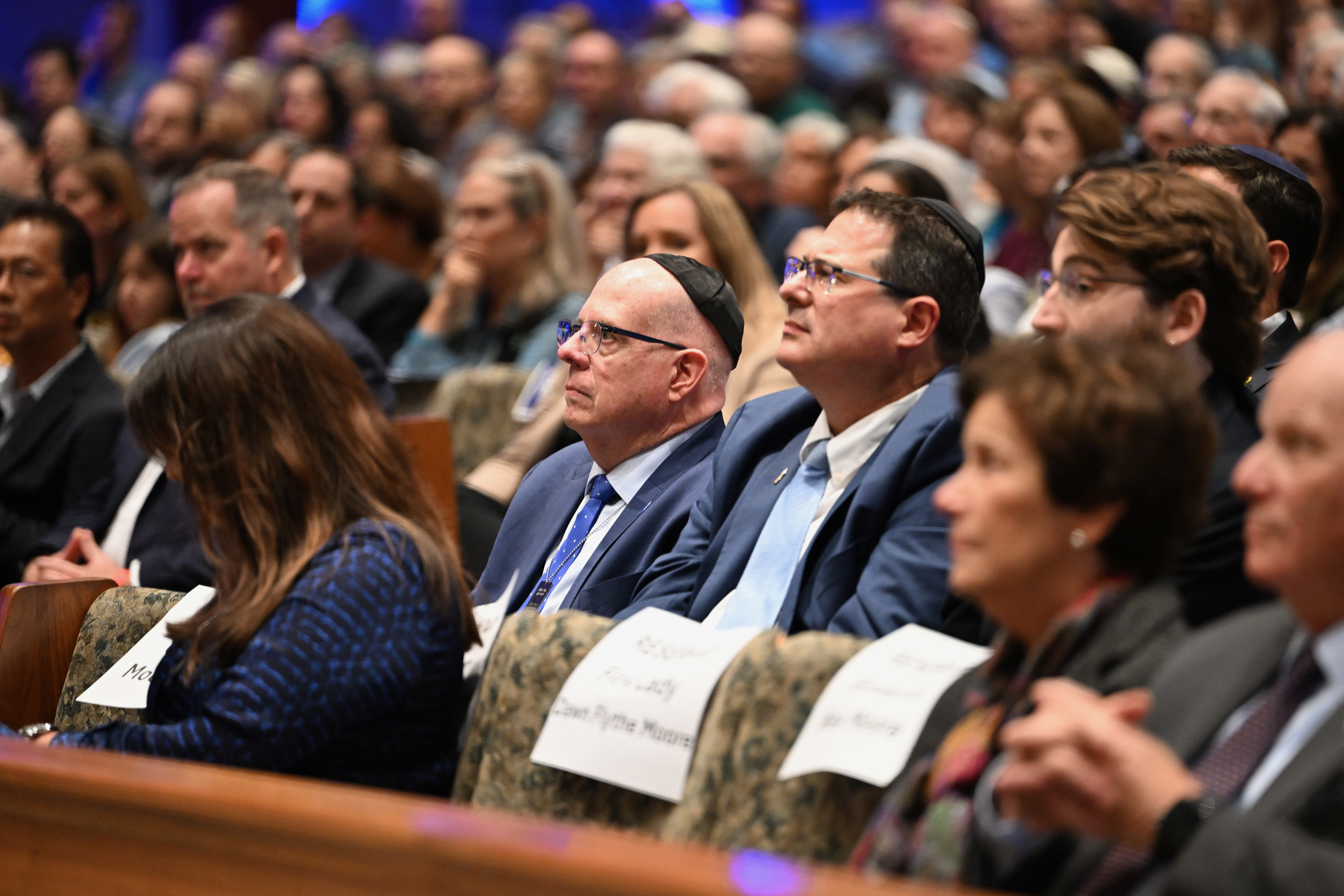
Hogan attends services at Beth El Congregation on the anniversary of the October 7 attacks, 2024

During his campaign, Hogan promoted policy platforms that included proposals to increase funding for police departments and border patrol, and lowering federal taxes on businesses and seniors. He called a 2024 referendum on enshrining Roe v. Wade into the Maryland Constitution "not really necessary". Hogan initially refused to clarify his stance on abortion, only saying that he would not vote for a national abortion ban if elected to the Senate. He also declined to say if he would support bills to protect access to in vitro fertilization into federal law, but later said that he would support legislation restoring the Roe decision, backing Question 1, and identifying as pro-choice. At the same time, Hogan declined to support the Women's Health Protection Act, citing provisions that explicitly ban a long list of abortion restrictions, saying that he would instead back a bipartisan compromise bill. Hogan also said that he would support federal legislation to ban assault weapons and impose universal background checks on gun purchases, and supported Israel in the Gaza war and criticized calls for a ceasefire in the conflict, saying that the war should not end until Hamas surrenders and releases all hostages.

In May 2024, Hogan posted on X (formerly Twitter) to say that Americans should "respect the verdict and the legal process", in reference to any decision made in the Trump hush money trial. Later that day, a jury found Trump guilty on all charges. This caused Hogan backlash among some pro-Trump Republicans, most notably including senior Trump campaign advisor Chris LaCivita, who replied to Hogan's post saying that Hogan's campaign has "ended"; as well as Lara Trump, the co-chair of the Republican National Committee and daughter-in-law to the former president. Lara Trump said in an interview that "[Hogan] doesn’t deserve the respect of anyone in the Republican Party at this point, and quite frankly, anybody in America." Ultimately, in early June 2024, Donald Trump endorsed Hogan in his senatorial campaign. Hogan was not aware of Trump's impending endorsement, and in response his campaign released a statement stating Hogan was still not supporting Trump's presidential campaign.

Hogan was defeated by Alsobrooks in the general election on November 5, 2024. His performance marked the strongest showing for a Republican in a Maryland Senate race since 2006, and he became the first Republican to receive over one million votes in such a contest, setting a record for the most votes ever received by a Republican candidate in Maryland.

== Personal life ==
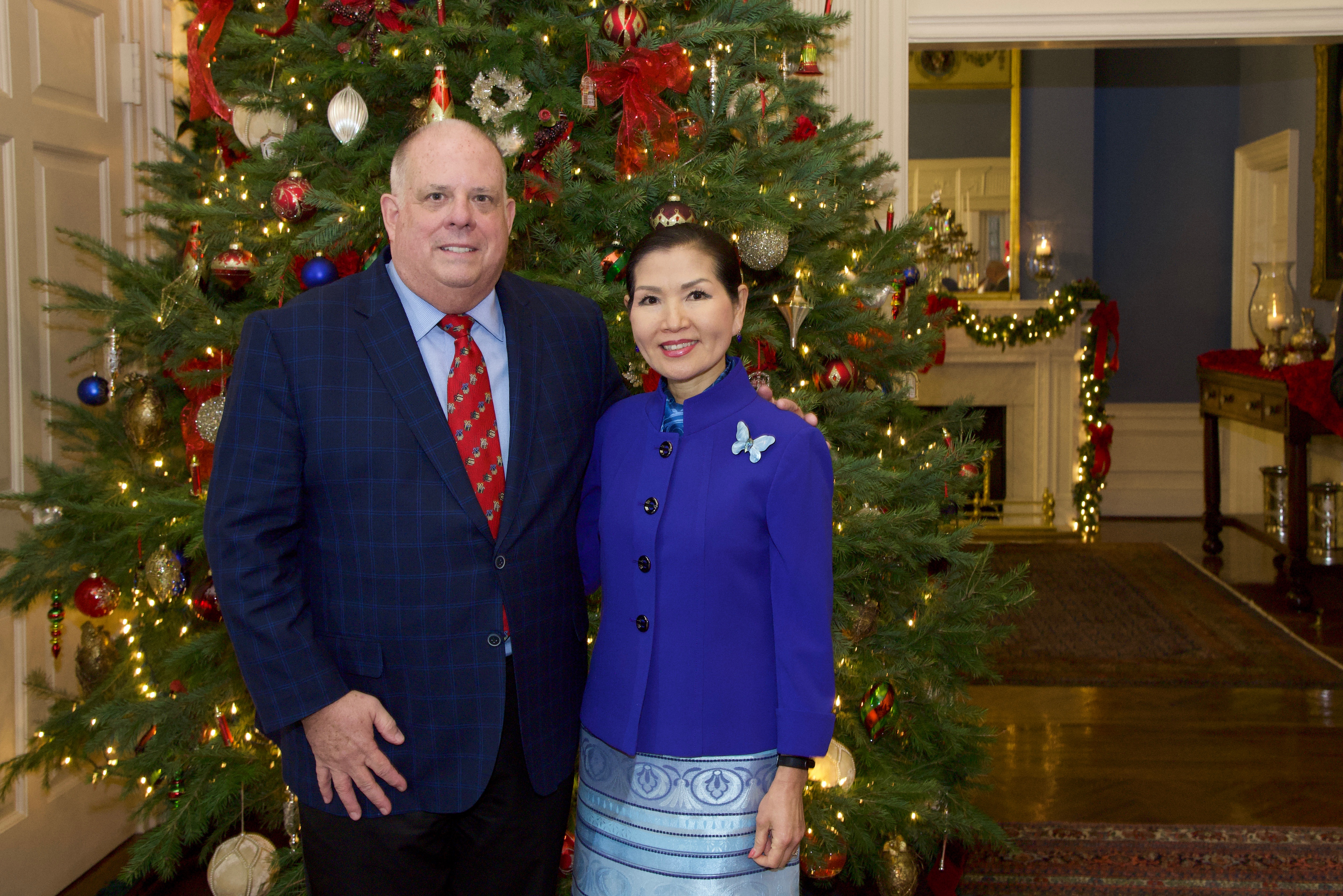
Hogan with his wife Yumi in 2018

During his governorship, Hogan resided in Government House in Annapolis with his wife Yumi Hogan, a Korean-origin U.S. citizen who is an artist and adjunct instructor at Maryland Institute College of Art. The couple met in 2001 and married in 2004. Hogan and his wife are Roman Catholic. Hogan is the stepfather of Yumi's three adult daughters from her first marriage: Kim Velez, Jaymi Sterling, and Julie Kim. Sterling has served as state's attorney for St. Mary's County since 2023. Hogan's half-brother, Patrick N. Hogan, represented a district in Frederick County, Maryland in the Maryland House of Delegates from 2003 to 2007 and 2011 to 2015.

In September 2014, Hogan said that he had lost at least 25 pounds (10 kg) while campaigning for governor. He regained 40 pounds (20 kg) from eating unhealthily and from steroids he took while being treated for non-Hodgkin lymphoma in 2015, but had lost half of the regained weight by 2017. During the COVID-19 pandemic, Hogan lost more than 30 pounds (10 kg) after enrolling in a Medifast program.

In June 2015, Hogan announced that he had been diagnosed with stage-three non-Hodgkin lymphoma and was undergoing treatment. He completed 18 weeks of chemotherapy and announced in November 2015 that the cancer was in remission. He underwent his last chemotherapy treatment in October 2016 and was deemed cancer-free. In January 2021, Hogan underwent surgery to remove early stage squamous cell skin cancer from his face and shoulder, a repeat of similar surgery he had in 2018.

In 2021, Hogan purchased a home for $1.1 million in Davidsonville, Maryland.

== Electoral history ==
Maryland's 5th congressional district special Republican primary election, 1981
Party	Candidate	Votes	%
Republican	Audrey Scott	8,750	63.21
Republican	Larry Hogan	3,095	22.36
Republican	John Lillard	1,139	8.23
Republican	Jean Speicher	236	1.70
Republican	David Elliot	215	1.55
Republican	Jon William Robinson	101	0.73
Republican	Woodworth Watrous	79	0.57
Republican	George Benns	72	0.52
Republican	Frederick Taylor	66	0.48
Republican	Irvin Henson Jr.	40	0.29
Republican	Jack Price	25	0.18
Republican	Robert Byron Brickell	24	0.17

Maryland's 5th congressional district Republican primary election, 1992
Party	Candidate	Votes	%
Republican	Larry Hogan	12,661	48.60
Republican	Gerald Schuster	4,967	19.07
Republican	John Douglas Parran	4,020	15.43
Republican	Theodore Henderson	2,275	8.73
Republican	Michael Swetnam	1,495	5.74
Republican	John Michael Fleig	633	2.43

Maryland's 5th congressional district election, 1992
Party	Candidate	Votes	%
Democratic	Steny Hoyer	118,312	52.98
Republican	Larry Hogan	97,982	43.87
Independent	William Johnston	6,990	3.13
Independent	James McLaughlin	40	0.02
Independent	Lisa Ashelman	2	0.00

Maryland gubernatorial Republican primary, 2014
Party	Candidate	Votes	%
Republican	Larry Hogan/Boyd Rutherford	92,376	42.98
Republican	David R. Craig/Jeannie Haddaway	62,639	29.14
Republican	Charles Lollar/Kenneth Timmerman	33,292	15.49
Republican	Ron George/Shelley Aloi	26,628	12.39

2014 Maryland gubernatorial election
Party	Candidate	Votes	%
Republican	Larry Hogan	884,400	51.03
Democratic	Anthony Brown	818,890	47.25
Libertarian	Shawn Quinn	25,382	1.46

Maryland gubernatorial Republican primary, 2018
Party	Candidate	Votes	%
Republican	Larry Hogan (incumbent)	210,935	100.00%
Total votes		210,935	100.00%

2018 Maryland gubernatorial election
Party	Candidate	Votes	%
Republican	Larry Hogan (incumbent)	1,275,644	55.4
Democratic	Ben Jealous	1,002,639	43.5
Libertarian	Shawn Quinn	13,241	0.6
Green	Ian Schlakman	11,175	0.5

United States Senate Republican primary election in Maryland, 2024
Party	Candidate	Votes	%
Republican	Larry Hogan	183,661	64.18%
Republican	Robin Ficker	79,517	27.79%
Republican	Chris Chaffee	9,134	3.19%
Republican	Lorie Friend	5,867	2.05%
Republican	John A. Myrick	4,987	1.74%
Republican	Moe Barakat	2,203	0.77%
Republican	Laban Seyoum	782	0.27%
Total votes		286,151	100.00%

United States Senate election in Maryland, 2024
Party	Candidate	Votes	%	±%
Democratic	Angela Alsobrooks	1,650,912	54.64%	−10.22%
Republican	Larry Hogan	1,294,344	42.84%	+12.53%
Libertarian	Mike Scott	69,396	2.30%	+1.30%
Write-in		6,726	0.22%	+0.12%
Total votes		3,021,378	100.00%	

Party political offices
Preceded by Bob Ehrlich	Republican nominee for Governor of Maryland; 2014, 2018	Succeeded by Dan Cox
Preceded by Tony Campbell	Republican nominee for U.S. Senator from Maryland (Class 1); 2024	Most recent
Political offices
Preceded by Martin O'Malley	Governor of Maryland; 2015–2023	Succeeded by Wes Moore
Preceded by Steve Bullock	Chair of the National Governors Association; 2019–2020	Succeeded by Andrew Cuomo
U.S. order of precedence (ceremonial)
Preceded by Martin O'Malley as Former Governor	Order of precedence of the United States; Within Maryland	Succeeded by Jack Markell as Former Governor
Preceded by Martin O'Malley as Former Governor	Order of precedence of the United States; Outside Maryland	Succeeded by David Beasley as Former Governor
