= Chesapeake Utilities =

American corporation

Chesapeake Utilities Corporation
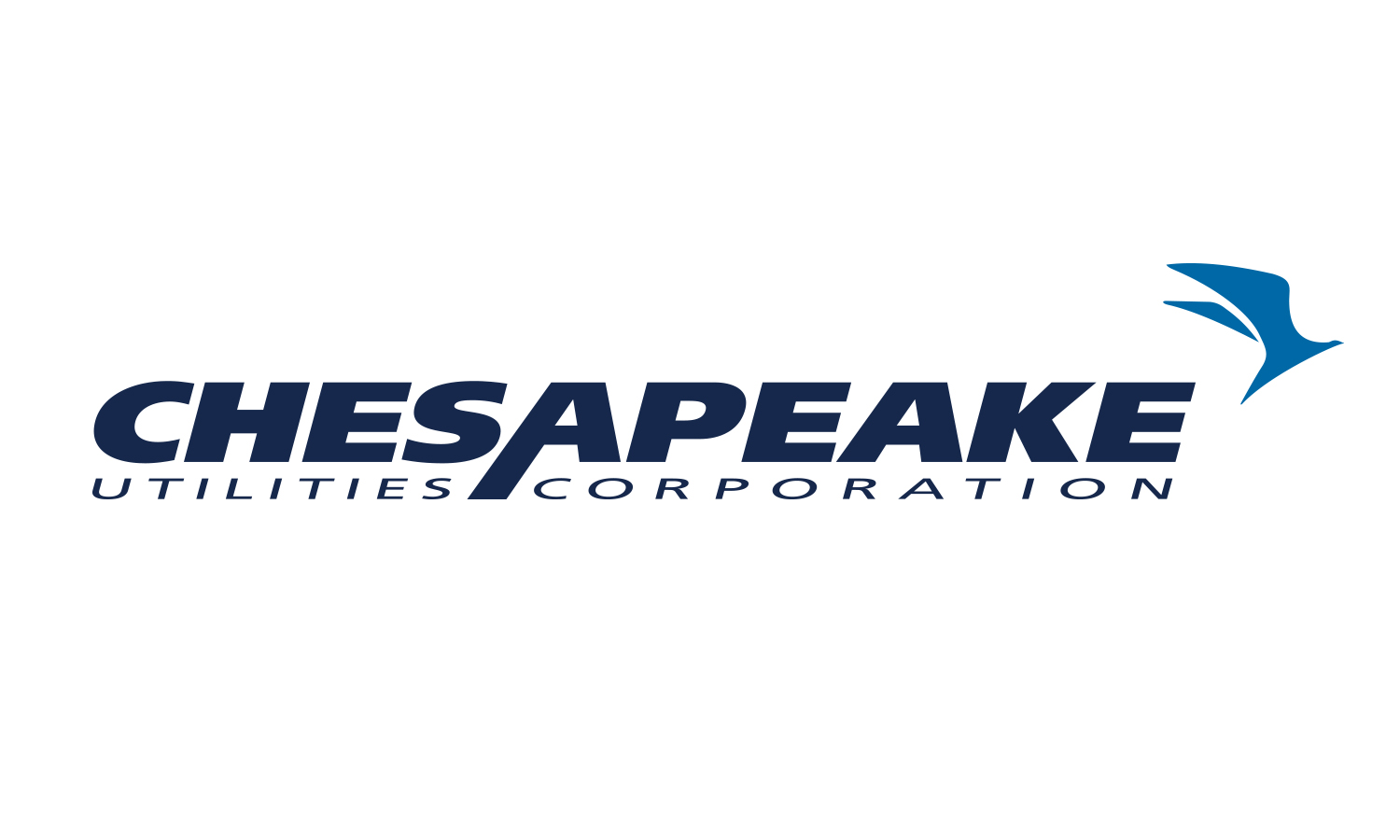
- Company type: Public
- Traded as: NYSE: CPK; Russell 2000 Component; S&P 600 component
- Industry: Energy
- Founded: 1859
- Headquarters: Dover, Delaware
- Products: Natural gas
- Website: www.chpk.com

Chesapeake Utilities Corporation is an American corporation formed in 1947. Chesapeake Utilities Corporation is a diversified energy company engaged, through our operating divisions and subsidiaries, in various energy and other businesses. Headquartered in Delaware, Chesapeake Utilities Corporation operates primarily within the Middle-Atlantic, Southeast and Midwest regions, providing natural gas distribution and transmission, natural gas supply, gathering and processing, electric distribution and propane distribution service.

== History ==
Chesapeake Utilities Corporation was incorporated in Delaware in 1947. Chesapeake Utilities Corporation is a diversified energy company engaged, directly or through operating divisions and subsidiaries, in regulated and unregulated energy businesses. The Company's common stock began trading on the NASDAQ Exchange in 1985 and on the New York Stock Exchange (currently traded as CPK) in 1993.

The company began construction of the controversial Eastern Shore Pipeline on the Eastern Shore of Maryland in 2021.

== Subsidiaries ==
Chesapeake Utilities Corporation operates directly or through operating divisions and subsidiaries throughout the diversified energy midstream and downstream supply chain.

Aspire Energy of Ohio operates more than 2,600 miles of pipeline systems in 40 counties throughout Ohio.

Chesapeake Utilities and Sandpiper Energy distribute natural gas to tens of thousands of residential, commercial and industrial customers in Delaware and Maryland. Additionally, Sandpiper Energy distributes propane and natural gas to customers in Worcester County, Maryland.

Eastern Shore Natural Gas owns and operates a 448-mile interstate pipeline that transports natural gas from various points in Pennsylvania to customers in Delaware, Maryland and Pennsylvania.

Florida Public Utilities (FPU) distributes natural gas to tens of thousands of residential and commercial customers in Florida. It also distributes electricity and propane to various regions in Florida.

Peninsula Energy Services Company (PESCO) provides natural gas supply and supply management services to customers in Florida and on the Delmarva Peninsula.

Peninsula Pipeline Company provides natural gas transportation services in Florida.

Sharp Energy distributes propane to nearly 40,000 customers in Delaware, eastern Pennsylvania, Maryland and Virginia. Sharp AutoGas fuels more than 600 vehicles through its more than 30 propane fueling stations throughout the Delmarva Peninsula.
