= Eastern Shore Pipeline =

Maryland natural gas pipeline

- Interactive Map of the Eastern Shore Pipeline

Location
- Country: United States
- State: Maryland; Virginia (possible)
- Start: Wicomico County, Maryland
- Passes through: Salisbury, Maryland; Fruitland, Maryland; Princess Anne, Maryland
- To: University of Maryland Eastern Shore; Eastern Correctional Institution
- Runs alongside: U.S. Route 13

General information
- Type: Natural Gas
- Status: Proposed
- Owner: Eastern Shore Natural Gas Company
- Expected: Late 2021

Technical information
- Length: 16.5 mi (26.6 km)
- Diameter: 10 in (254 mm)

The Eastern Shore Pipeline, part of the Del-Mar Energy Pathway Project, is a fracked natural gas pipeline on the Eastern Shore of Maryland as an expansion of existing pipeline infrastructure on the Delmarva Peninsula. The project was completed in September 2021.

== Overview ==
The pipeline expansion extends further into Wicomico County and into Somerset County, passing through Salisbury, Maryland to reach the termini at University of Maryland Eastern Shore and Eastern Correctional Institution. Somerset was one of three counties in Maryland that did not have access to natural gas. Maryland officials also stated that the pipeline could be expanded south into the Eastern Shore of Virginia. While Maryland has banned the process of fracking statewide, the state allows pipelines carrying fracked natural gas to be built. In 2018, the Maryland Public Service Commission approved $100 million in spending on fracked natural gas infrastructure.

The expansion connects with existing pipeline in a pigging facility in downtown Salisbury owned by Sharp Energy. A 10-inch (250 mm) diameter length of piping measuring 6.8 miles (10.9 km) then extends to a Metering and Regulation Station in Eden, Maryland, running alongside U.S. Route 13. From there, a 9.7-mile (15.6 km) length of 8-inch (200 mm) diameter pipe continues along Route 13 to Eastern Correctional Institution and a Mountaire Farms processing plant. University of Maryland Eastern Shore is connected midway down this stretch.

=== State approval ===
The pipeline has received approval in a number of areas from the state government. In December 2020, one of two wetlands licenses needed due to the fragile ecosystems traversed by the pipeline was granted unanimously by the Maryland Board of Public Works.

== Criticism ==
The pipeline has received significant pushback from local organizations due to primarily environmental concerns, including the Chesapeake Climate Action Network (CCAN), Lower Shore Progressive Caucus, and Sierra Club. The fact that the proposed pipeline would run through primarily minority communities has also been cited as a reason against its construction, with a representative of the CCAN calling the pipeline "an insult and an injustice to those communities."

Critics of the pipeline state that it will encourage fracking outside of the state and is dangerous to both humans and the environment. Environmentalists see the pipeline as a step in the wrong direction, investing in infrastructure that is not as clean as it could or should be. The pipeline's lifetime is also of concern among critics, as it may interfere with Maryland's long-term energy cleanliness goals. The Chesapeake Climate Action Network has expressed concerns that installing the pipeline may trigger a chain reaction of new pipeline construction, further damaging the environment.

== Support ==
Supporters of the pipeline's construction claim that the pipeline will bring jobs and economic growth to Somerset County and the surrounding area. Multiple state representatives, including State Senators Steve Hershey and Mary Beth Carozza, support the pipeline as a relatively clean source of energy that will bring development to the area. Other officials, including the Somerset County Development Commission Director and Salisbury Area Chamber of Commerce President, support the pipeline as well.
