= Hadden Clark =

American serial killer

- Born: Hadden Irving Clark; July 31, 1952 (age 74); Troy, New York, U.S.
- Other names: The Cross Dressing Cannibal; The Rockville Rocket
- Convictions: Second degree murder (2 counts); Robbery
- Penalty: 70 years imprisonment

Details
- Victims: 2+
- Span of crimes: 1986–1992
- Country: United States
- State: Maryland
- Date apprehended: November 6, 1992
- Imprisoned at: Eastern Correctional Institution, Westover, Maryland, U.S.

Hadden Irving Clark (born July 31, 1952) is an American murderer and suspected serial killer currently serving two 30-year sentences for the murders of 6-year-old Michele Lee Dorr in 1986, and 23-year-old Laura Houghteling in 1992. He was also given a 10-year sentence for robbery after stealing from a former landlord.

== Family ==
Clark is the second of four children, and was born and raised in Troy, New York. In 1984, his brother, Bradfield Clark, strangled a woman in California before eating several body parts.

While by all appearances an affluent and happy family to outsiders, Clark's parents were both alcoholics and often fought with each other in front of their children. Clark's father, who had a PhD in chemistry, worked in industrial research for different companies. Unhappy with his pay, he often changed jobs which meant the family moved frequently. As a teenager, Clark tortured and killed animals owned by children who bullied him.

Clark's mother dressed him in girls' clothes when drunk and called him "Kristen". His father, who is said to have suffered from "manic depression", eventually committed suicide in 1982.

Clark trained as a chef and served in the United States Navy until he was discharged after being diagnosed with paranoid schizophrenia in 1985. Over the years, he held a number of menial jobs but was mostly homeless. Clark was arrested multiple times for theft and retaliation. He was arrested for robbery after he vandalized a former landlord's property and committed several thefts.

== Murders ==
On May 31, 1986, Clark was ordered by his brother Geoffrey to move out of the latter's home in Silver Spring, Maryland. Michele Dorr, a six-year-old friend of his niece, came over looking for her. Clark took Michele to an upstairs room and slashed her throat with a chef knife. He attempted to sexually assault her corpse, drank some of her blood, ate a piece of her flesh, and stuffed her in a duffel bag. He buried her in a park 12 miles away.

On October 18, 1992, he killed 23-year-old Laura Houghteling in Bethesda, Maryland. Clark was working as a gardener for Laura's mother Penny when she accused Clark of stealing tools from her backyard shed. Clark entered the house through the back door and stabbed Laura to death in her bedroom with a kitchen knife and suffocated her with a pillow. He carried her body in a bedsheet through a wooded area and buried her a half-mile away. He left behind a pillowcase with his fingerprint as he moved the body. He later returned and dressed up in a wig and women's clothes and left through the front door to make people think Laura left the house alive to buy time to clean the scene. Police soon discovered the bloody pillow and linked the print on it to Clark. Clark confessed and led police to Laura's body eight months after the murder. Police began looking at him for Dorr's murder after discovering he lived two houses down from Dorr's father at the time she disappeared. Police later tested his brother's old house for blood and found Dorr's blood in the wooden floorboards of an upstairs bedroom. Clark later led police to her body in January 2000.

== Alleged murders ==
Clark has confessed to murdering dozens of people starting as a teenager. In 2004, he sent a letter claiming he had killed a then-unidentified woman on Cape Cod, Massachusetts in 1974 known as "Lady of the Dunes". Clark explained that he had buried evidence from the crime in his grandfather's garden and that he knew the woman's identity but was not going to tell authorities because he claimed they mistreated him. As he has paranoid schizophrenia, police doubt the accuracy of the confession. The decedent was identified in 2022 as Ruth Marie Terry, who was married at the time of her death to Guy Rockwall Muldavin, who was identified as her killer on August 28, 2023. Clark led police on December 15, 2000, to his grandparents' former property where they discovered a plastic bucket with more than 200 pieces of jewelry. Among the items were Laura Houghteling's high school class ring. He claimed the items were "trophies" he took from his victims.

== Media ==
=== Books ===
- Author Adrian Havill's book Born Evil: A True Story of Cannibalism and Sexual Murder (2001) is a true crime story of Hadden Clark's crimes.
- Author Robert Keller's book True Crime: American Monsters Volume 3: 12 Horrific American Serial Killers (2013) one of the 12 murderers reported on in the book is Hadden Clark. The author focuses on Clark's cross-dressing cannibalism and his stash of mementos suggesting there are more victims.

=== Television ===
- The Channel 5 (UK) series Born to Kill episode aired: 17 September 2013, reports on Clark's formative years and their impact on his adult criminal behavior.
- The Investigation Discovery network series Evil, I season 5 episode 32, "Dressed to Kill", aired August 3, 2012, reports on Houghteling's disappearance and law enforcement suspects the family gardener Clark is responsible. When police search his storage shed they discover evidence tying him to her death.
- Court TV released multiple crime-documentary episodes from different shows covering the Hadden Clark crimes.
- Forensic Files – Season 7, Episode 25: "Dressed to Kill", aired March 29, 2003, covers Michele Lee Dorr's case. Her dad is mentally traumatized by his daughter's passing and provides detectives with a false confession. However further investigation uncovers evidence leading to the real killer.
- The series Mugshots episode "Portrait of a Serial Killer: Hadden Clark", aired June 1, 2002.
- The true crime and on-the-scene police investigation series Crime Stories episode "Dark Secrets: Hadden Clark", aired: 2002.
- The series The Investigators episode "Dark Secrets", aired: 9 September 2002.
- Forensic Files – Season 3, Episode 9: "Beaten by a Hair", aired: November 26, 1998, covers Laura Houghteling's disappearance. Police find the victim's hair brush with 30 hairs, one of which was artificial and did not belong to Laura. The artificial hair, along with other forensic evidence, directly tied Clark to her death.
- In September 2024, Investigation Discovery aired a seven-episode documentary about Clark, "Born Evil: The Serial Killer and the Savior".

=== Podcasts ===
- The Last Podcast on the Left covered Clark in a two-part episode, "Hadden Clark Part I: Mommy's Basement Bakery" and "Hadden Clark Part II: Women's Panties", aired November 2019.
- In Radio Rental, episode 65 (2024), a woman recounts a run-in with Hadden Clark in Bethesda, Maryland – only years later, after hearing his crimes discussed on another podcast, did she realize how close she had come to tragedy.
- Small Town Murder covered Clark in episode #573, "Serial Killing Schizophrenic Cannibal – Bethesda, Maryland", aired February 2025.

== See also ==
- List of incidents of cannibalism
- List of serial killers in the United States
