= Adrian Havill =

American writer

Adrian Havill is an American author and journalist. Havill has written numerous newspaper and magazine articles, as well as eleven books, many of which are available as recorded audio discs.

== Personal life ==
Adrian Havill was born in Bournemouth, England in 1940 to Leslie and Molly Havill. After World War II ended he was brought to Vancouver, Canada by his mother in 1947. After five more marriages by his mother, he left home. Beginning in 1955 he voluntarily lived in an orphanage, Jeffs Home for Boys, in Kent, Washington until his 18th birthday. On that day he joined the U.S. Army where he became a paratrooper with the 82nd Airborne Division and also the editor of its Fort Bragg, N.C. newspaper, The Paraglide. While in the military, he became an American citizen. In 1962 his extended term of military duty ended and he settled in Washington, D.C.

His first job in Washington was as a copy aide for the then-weekly newsmagazine, U.S. News & World Report. Told he could not write editorially for USN&WR he began freelancing which led to positions in various advertising and public relations agencies. He subsequently formed his own firm, Havill Associates, Inc. In 1992 he wrote The Last Mogul, an unauthorized biography of Jack Kent Cooke, the owner of the then-Washington Redskins, and who had owned both the Los Angeles Lakers and the Los Angeles Kings as well as multiple other franchises in sports.

A year later he authored Deep Truth, a joint biography of journalists Bob Woodward and Carl Bernstein.

Man of Steel, a 1996 biography of actor Christopher Reeve, was sold worldwide and translated into Chinese.

A 1999 book, The Mother, The Son, and the Socialite, detailed the lives of mother and son serial killers, Sante and Kenneth Kimes. It was made into a motion picture starring Mary Tyler Moore and Jean Stapleton.

Another book in the True Crime genre, While Innocents Slept, was published a year later and is also available as an audiobook.

Months later, Havill authored Born Evil, an account of the crimes of serial killer Hadden Clark. Born Evil was a six part series on ID Discovery in 2024 and is also available as an eBook.

In 2001, Havill segued into espionage with The Spy Who Stayed Out In The Cold, an account of an FBI agent who spied for the Soviet and Russian intelligence services, Robert Hanssen.

He has also co-authored books on subjects as varied as OJ Simpson and the 82nd Airborne Division.

Havill lives in Winter Park, Florida with his wife of 60 years, Georgiana. They have 2 children and 3 grandchildren.

== Books authored ==
- The Spy Who Stayed Out in the Cold: The Secret Life of FBI Double Agent Robert Hanssen (2001)
- While Innocents Slept: A Story of Revenge, Murder, and SIDS (2001)
- The Mother, the Son and the Socialite: The True Story of a Mother-Son Crime Spree (1999) (about Kenny and Sante Kimes)
- Man of Steel: the Career and Courage of Christopher Reeve (1996)
- Deep Truth: The Lives of Bob Woodward and Carl Bernstein (1993)
- The Last Mogul: The Unauthorized Biography of Jack Kent Cooke (1992)
- Born Evil: A True Story of Cannibalism and Serial Murder (2001) (about Hadden Clark)
