= Eastern Correctional Institution =

State prison in Westover, Somerset County, Maryland, US

Coordinates: 38°09′26″N 75°42′15″W

- Interactive map of Eastern Correctional Institution
- Location: 30420 Revells Neck Road Westover, Maryland
- Status: medium
- Capacity: 3400
- Opened: 1987
- Managed by: Maryland Department of Public Safety and Correctional Services

The Eastern Correctional Institution (ECI) is a medium-security state prison for men located in Westover, Somerset County, Maryland, owned and operated by the Maryland Department of Public Safety and Correctional Services. Eastern has a minimum-security Annex, completed in 1993, and housing some 560 inmates. The total capacity of the minimum- and medium-security sections is around 3,400. With an actual population of about 3,300, this is Maryland's largest prison.

The facility is adjacent to the Somerset County Detention Center.

In October 2016, federal authorities indicted 80 people as part of a scheme to smuggle drugs, telephones and pornography into the facility. Also while there the federal authorities investigated six different murders within the facility, one of them resulting in one inmate being partially decapitated. The investigation led to the charge and conviction of an inmate Patrick Simpson#3378314, who was also under suspicion for two previous murders and for smuggling large amounts of illicit drugs and tobacco. Simpson subsequently pleaded out to assault with a deadly weapon and received an additional two years on his sentence to be served before his release.

== Notable inmates ==
- Hadden Clark, child murderer, cannibal and serial killer
