= List of ghost towns in Maryland =

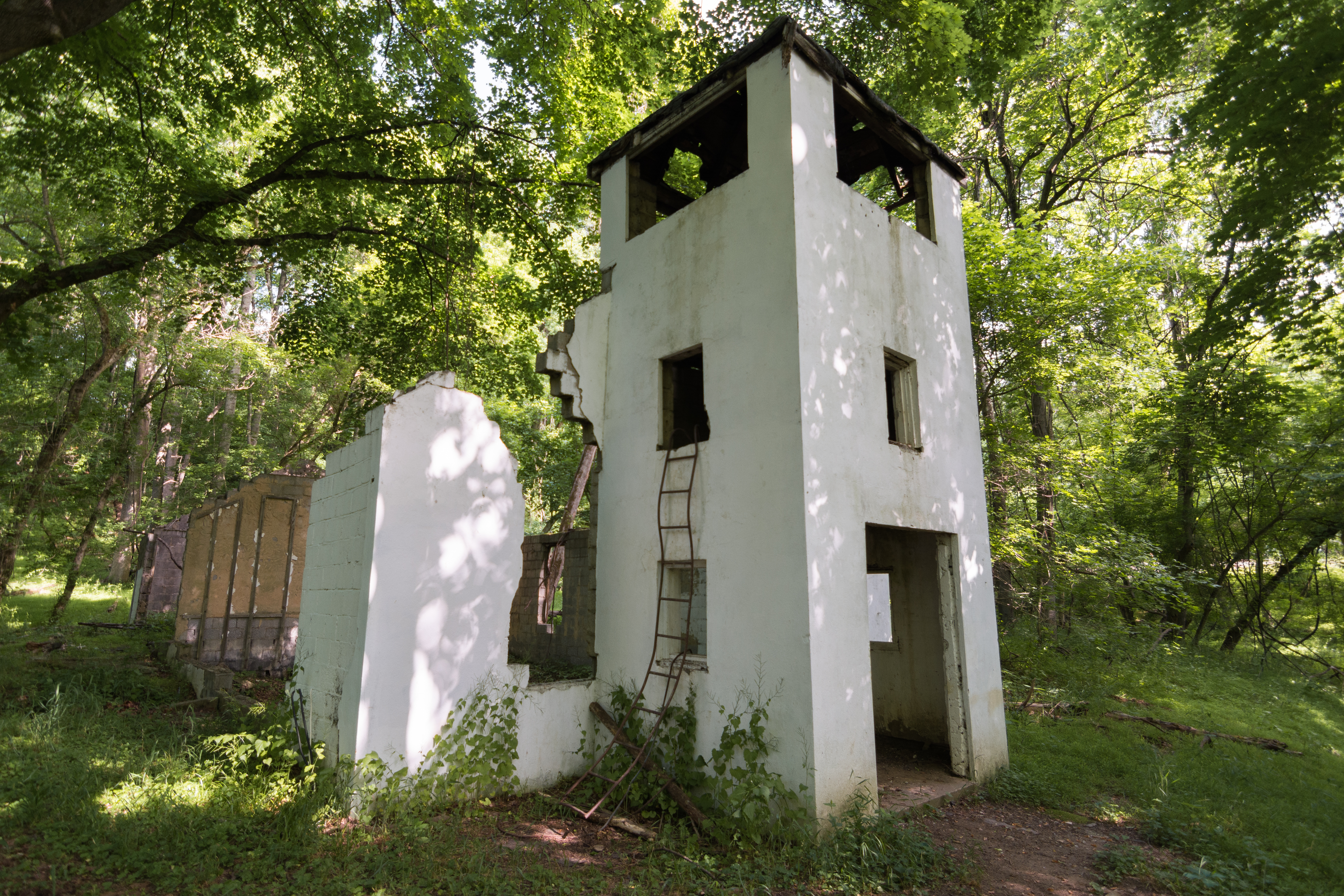
Pentecostal Holiness Church ruins in Daniels

The following is an incomplete list of ghost towns in Maryland. Ghost towns can include sites in various states of disrepair and abandonment. Some sites no longer have any trace of civilization and have reverted to pasture land or empty fields. Other sites are unpopulated but still have standing buildings. Some sites may even have a sizable, though small population, but there are far fewer citizens than in its grander historic past.

Many ghost towns can be located in the Appalachian counties, particularly Garrett County. During the 18th and 19th century, a number of "boom towns" were formed to participate in the flourishing coal, railroad, and iron industries. Towards the late 19th century, the resources in the region had begun to deplete, and the onset of the Great Depression finally killed many of the industrial towns.

== Classification ==
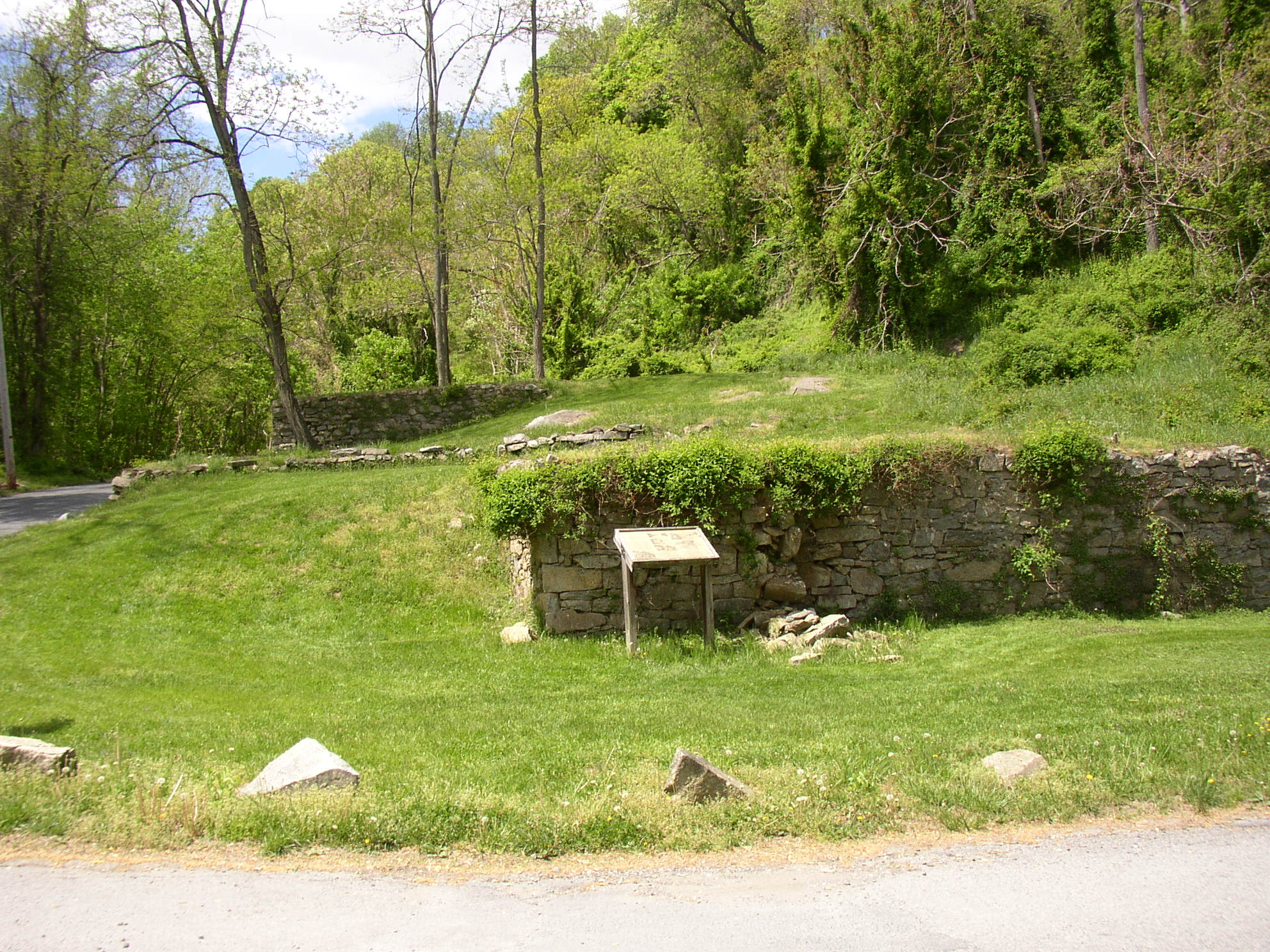
Foundation of a hotel in Lapidum

=== Barren site ===
- Sites no longer in existence
- Sites that have been destroyed
- Covered with water
- Reverted to pasture
- May have a few difficult to find foundations/footings at most

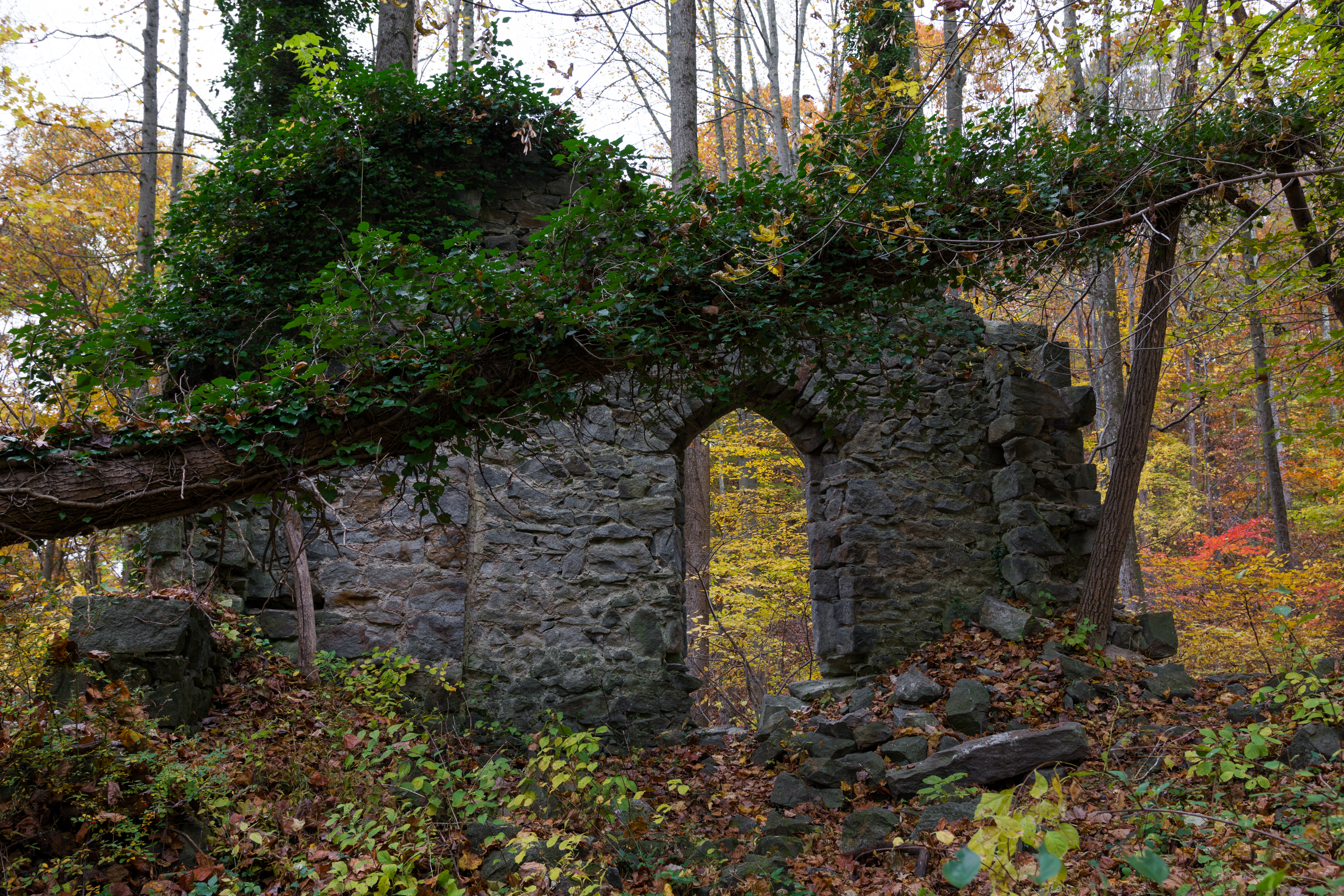
Ruins of a church in Daniels

=== Neglected site ===
  - Only rubble left
  - All buildings uninhabited
  - Roofless building ruins
  - Some buildings or houses still standing, but majority are roofless

=== Abandoned site ===
- Building or houses still standing
- Buildings and houses all abandoned
- No population, except caretaker
- Site no longer in existence except for one or two buildings, for example old church, grocery store

=== Semi abandoned site ===
- Building or houses still standing
- Buildings and houses largely abandoned
- few residents
- many abandoned buildings
- Small population
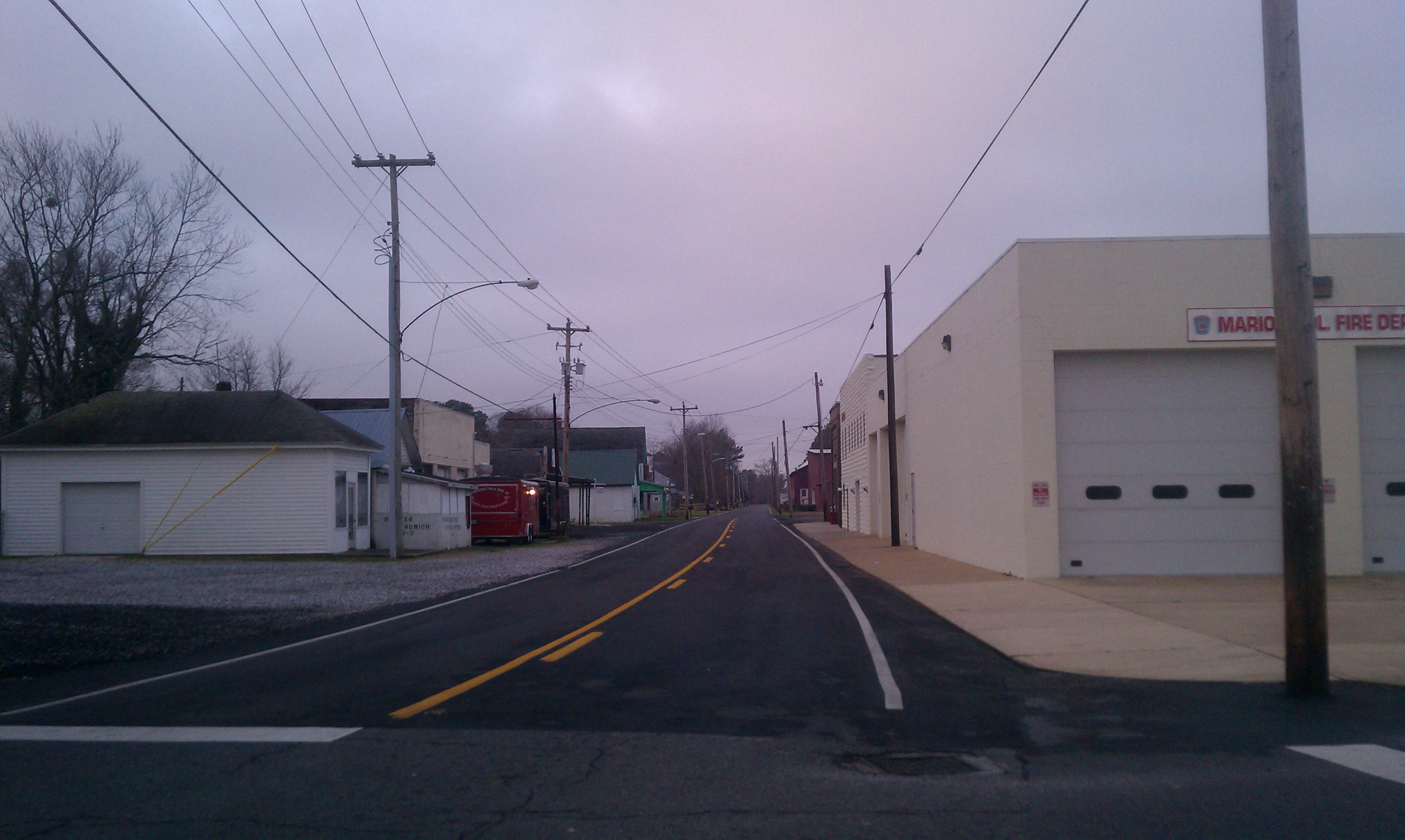
  Marion Station has declined sharply since the 1950s

=== Historic community ===
- Building or houses still standing
- Still a busy community
- Smaller than its boom years
- Population has decreased dramatically, to one fifth or less.

== List by County ==
=== Baltimore City ===
- Old Town Mall, a largely abandoned commercial district in the center of Baltimore.
- Wagner's Point, an industrial area of Baltimore which had all residents forcibly relocated in the late 1990s for environmental concerns.

=== Baltimore County ===
- Daniels (Partially in Howard County), an old milling town on the Patapsco River.
- Relay, is a booming railroad town full of residents, victorian homes and historic landmarks
- Warren, which was flooded during the creation of Loch Raven Reservoir

=== Calvert County ===
- Calverton, the first county seat of Calvert County, which is today a barren site.
- Wilson, which appeared on maps as late as 1901.

=== Cecil County ===
- Conowingo. The original town was flooded by the creation of Conowingo Reservoir, and the residents relocated to a location nearby.
- Frenchtown, formerly a hub for steam boat travel, which was rendered obsolete by the Chesapeake and Delaware Canal and then later by railroads.
- United States Naval Training Center Bainbridge, a naval recruit training center that was operational from 1942 to 1976.

=== Charles County ===
- Port Tobacco Village, once the second largest town in Maryland, by 2010 it had declined to the smallest incorporated town in Maryland.

=== Frederick County ===
- Harmony Grove, a former milling town which was abandoned in the early 20th century and widely demolished in the 1960s-1970s for a highway expansion.
- Monocacy. Considered to be the oldest settlement in Western Maryland, the site of Monocacy was lost completely after being abandoned in the early 19th century, and has never been found despite a multitude of historical evidence it existed.

=== Garrett County ===
- Altamont
- Bloomington
- Blooming Rose, first settled in 1791.
- Davis
- Dodson
- Floyd
- Frankville, notable for the 1876 death of Francis Thomas.
- Gleason
- Gorman
- Kempton, a coal town on the border of West Virginia.
- Kendall, an old logging town.
- Schell (partially in Mineral County, West Virginia)
- Selbysport
- Shallmar
- Skipnish
- Thomas
- Vindex
- Wallman
- Wilson (partially in Grant County, West Virginia)

=== Harford County ===
- Lapidum

=== Howard County ===
- Daniels (Partially in Baltimore County)

=== Prince George's County ===
- Good Luck

=== Queen Anne's County ===
- Broad Creek

=== Somerset County ===
- Marion Station
- Tulls Corner, a nearly extinct community near Marion Station.

=== St. Mary's County ===
- St. Mary's City, a former colonial town that has been replaced by a state-run historic area and St. Mary's College of Maryland.

=== Washington County ===
- Fort Ritchie, a former military base which closed in 1998. The last residents were evicted in 2017.
- Four Locks, found in the Chesapeake and Ohio Canal National Historical Park.
- Weverton. Although there is a current Weverton, it's not located on the original site.

=== Worcester County ===
- Sinepuxent

== See also ==
- List of counties in Maryland
- Category:Mining in Maryland
- Baltimore and Annapolis Railroad
