= Dodson, Maryland =

Ghost town in Garrett County, Maryland

Dodson is a ghost town in Garrett County, Maryland. Dodson was a "boom town" that sprung up with the coal industry in Appalachia in the early 1900s. It died out with other nearby towns in the 1920s and 1930s.

== Geography ==
Dodson is located in the Georges Creek Basin along the Upper Potomac River, upstream of Bloomington and near Kitzmiller and Shallmar. Dodson was divided from Shallmar by a small creek at the end of the main road.

== History ==
Dodson was founded in the early 20th century as a mining community, owned by a coal company. The residents of the town were mostly of European descent, both immigrant and American-born. At its peak, there were 7 coal mines in Dodson. The nearby towns of Gleason and Vindex would also become ghost towns. Notable buildings in Dodson were a store, a schoolhouse, and a Methodist church, though none survive. A house owned by the coal company is the only building still standing in Dodson. the 1920s and 1930s, coal mining in the region became less profitable, and mines across the region closed down, leading to the depopulation of many towns, including Dodson.

== See also ==
- List of ghost towns in Maryland
