= Abram Creek (West Virginia) =

Abram Creek Tributary to North Branch Potomac River
- Location within West Virginia Location within the United States

Location
- Country: United States
- State: West Virginia
- County: Mineral; Grant

Physical characteristics
- Source: North Fork Lunice Creek divide
  - location: about 0.1 miles south-southeast of Bismarck, West Virginia
  - coordinates: 39°12′37″N 079°13′41″W
  - elevation: 2,920 ft (890 m)
- Mouth: North Branch Potomac River
  - location: Harrison, West Virginia / Shallmar, Maryland
  - coordinates: 39°22′45″N 079°12′08″W
  - elevation: 1,670 ft (510 m)
- Length: 18.35 mi (29.53 km)
- Basin size: 44.19 square miles (114.5 km^{2})
- Discharge
  - average: 81.34 cu ft/s (2.303 m^{3}/s) at mouth with North Branch Potomac River

Basin features
- Progression: generally north
- River system: Potomac River
- Tributaries
  - left: Johnnycake Run
  - right: Little Creek; Laurel Run; Glade Run; Emory Creek
- Bridges: US 48, WV 93, Sugar Grove Farm Road, WV 42, Bulldozer Road (x2), Jones Hollow, US 50, WV 2/3, WV 2, WV 2/2

Abram Creek is a 19.4-mile-long (31.2 km) tributary stream of the North Branch Potomac River in Grant and Mineral counties in West Virginia's Eastern Panhandle.

== Variant names ==
In 1895, the Board on Geographic Names officially decided upon Abram Creek as the stream's name. According to the Geographic Names Information System, Abram Creek has been known by the following names:

- Abraham Creek
- Abrahams Creek
- Abram's Creek
- Abrams Creek

== Course ==
Abram Creek rises on the North Fork Lunice Creek divide about 0.1 miles south-southeast of Bismarck, West Virginia. Tributaries to Abram Creek include Laurel Run, Glade Run, Johnnycake Run, and Emory Creek. Abram Creek enters the North Branch Potomac River at Harrison, West Virginia, across from Shallmar, Maryland.

== Watershed ==
Abram Creek drains 44.19 square miles (114.5 km^{2}) of area, receives about 43.2 in/year of precipitation, has a topographic wetness index of 410.24 and is about 75.9% forested.

== See also ==
- List of West Virginia rivers

== Maps ==
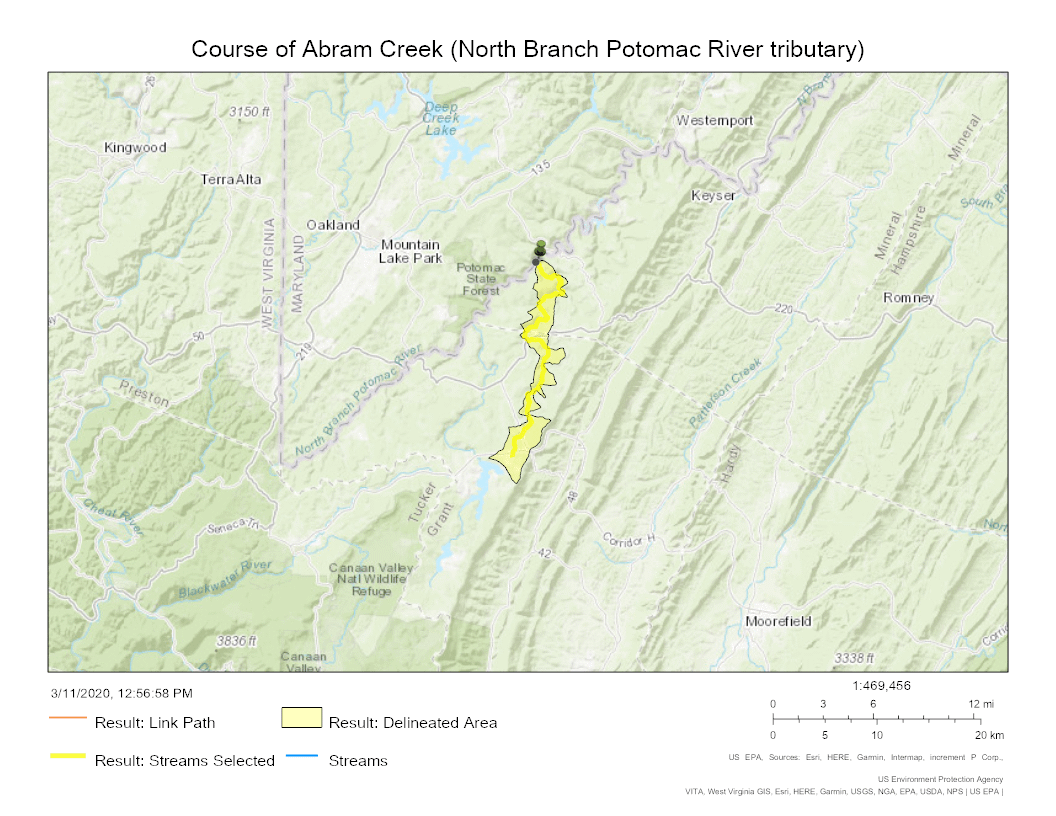
Course of Abram Creek (North Branch Potomac River tributary)

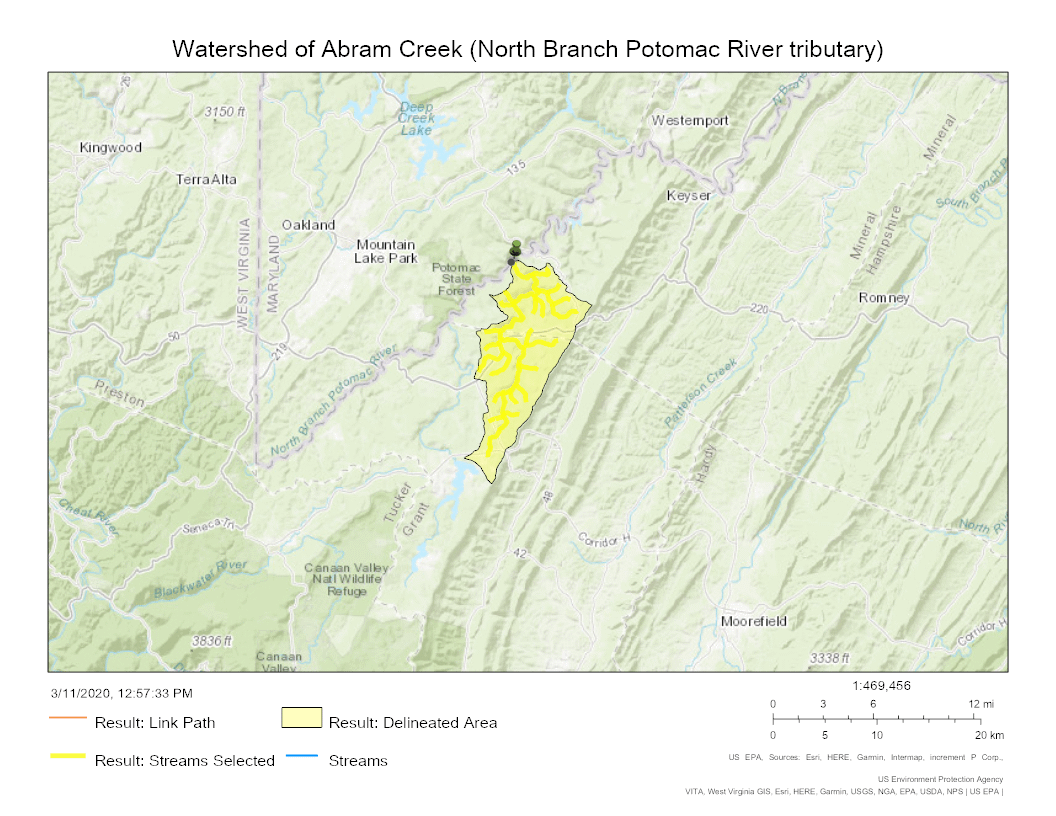
Watershed of Abram Creek (North Branch Potomac River tributary)
