= Daniels, Maryland =

- Ghost town
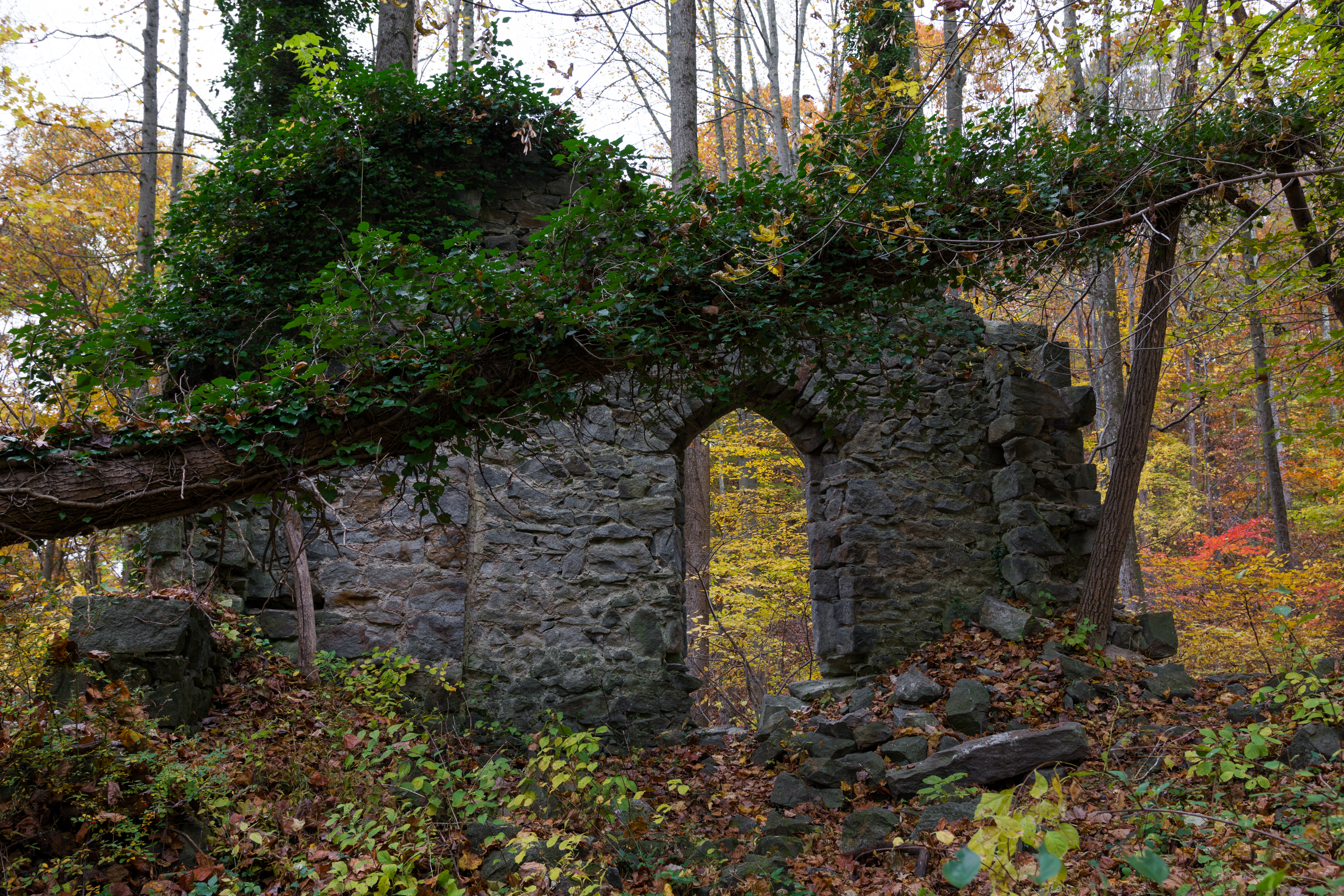
- The Saint Stanislaus Kostka Catholic Church, one of the few structures left in the town

- Location within Maryland Location within the United States
- Coordinates: 39°19′00″N 76°48′59″W
- Country: United States
- State: Maryland
- County: Howard

Daniels is a ghost town straddling the Patapsco River east of Woodstock and north of Old Ellicott City in Baltimore and Howard counties, Maryland, United States. It is the location of the Daniels Mill, a site listed on the National Register of Historic Places. Daniels is the home town of former Howard County Executive and State Senator James N. Robey. A postal office operated in the community from 1 March 1943 to 31 August 1971.

== History ==
The original settlement that would become the town of Daniels formed in 1810, when the family of Thomas Ely came to the area and built a textile mill. The community around the mill was known as Elysville. In 1853, the town was purchased by the family of James S. Gary and renamed to Alberton in honor of James' son Albert. The factory remained with the Gary family until 1940, when the Daniels Company bought the town and changed its name to Daniels. The Saint Stanislaus Kostka Catholic Church was struck by lightning and burnt down on September 24, 1926. By the late 1960s, approximately 90 families lived in Daniels. In 1968, the town's owner, the C.R. Daniels Company, gave notice to the remaining residents that it would close all housing within a few years. In June 1972, tropical storm Agnes rolled through the Patapsco River Valley and destroyed most of the remaining empty buildings in Daniels.

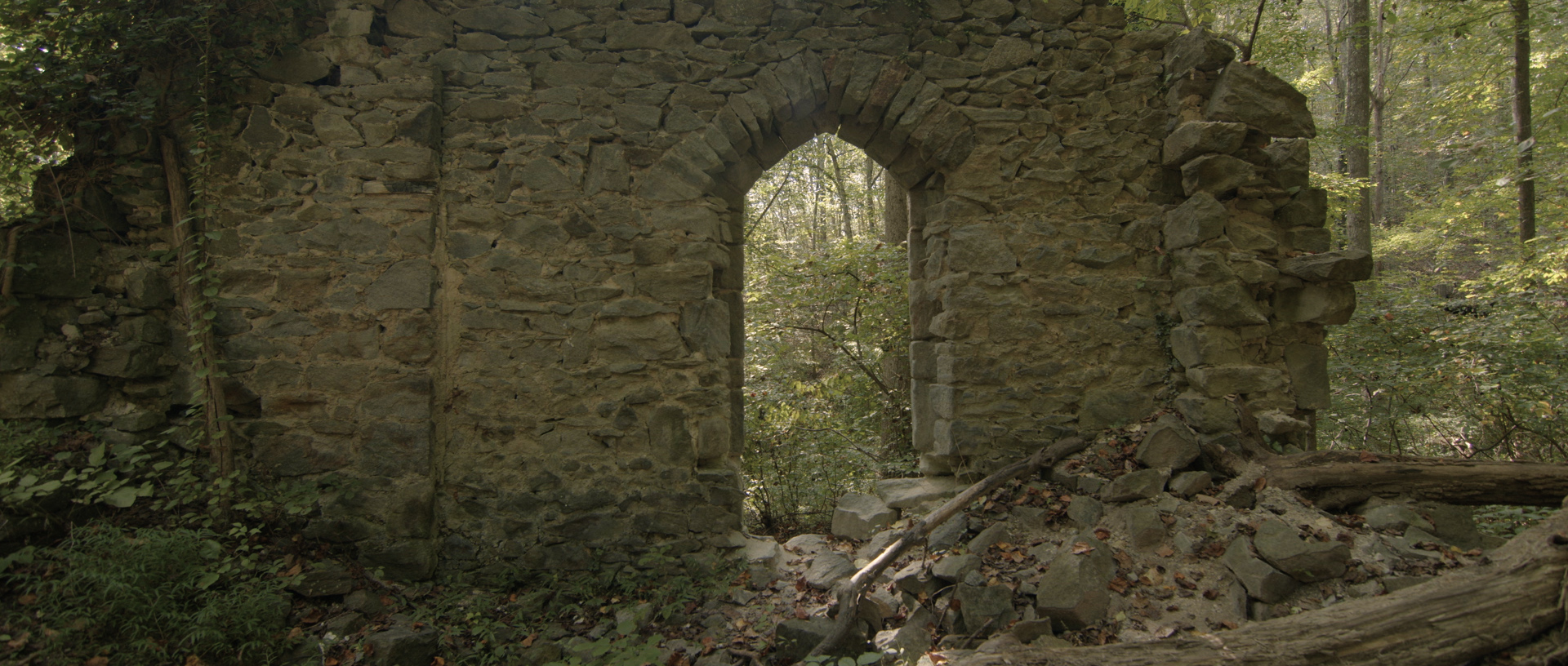

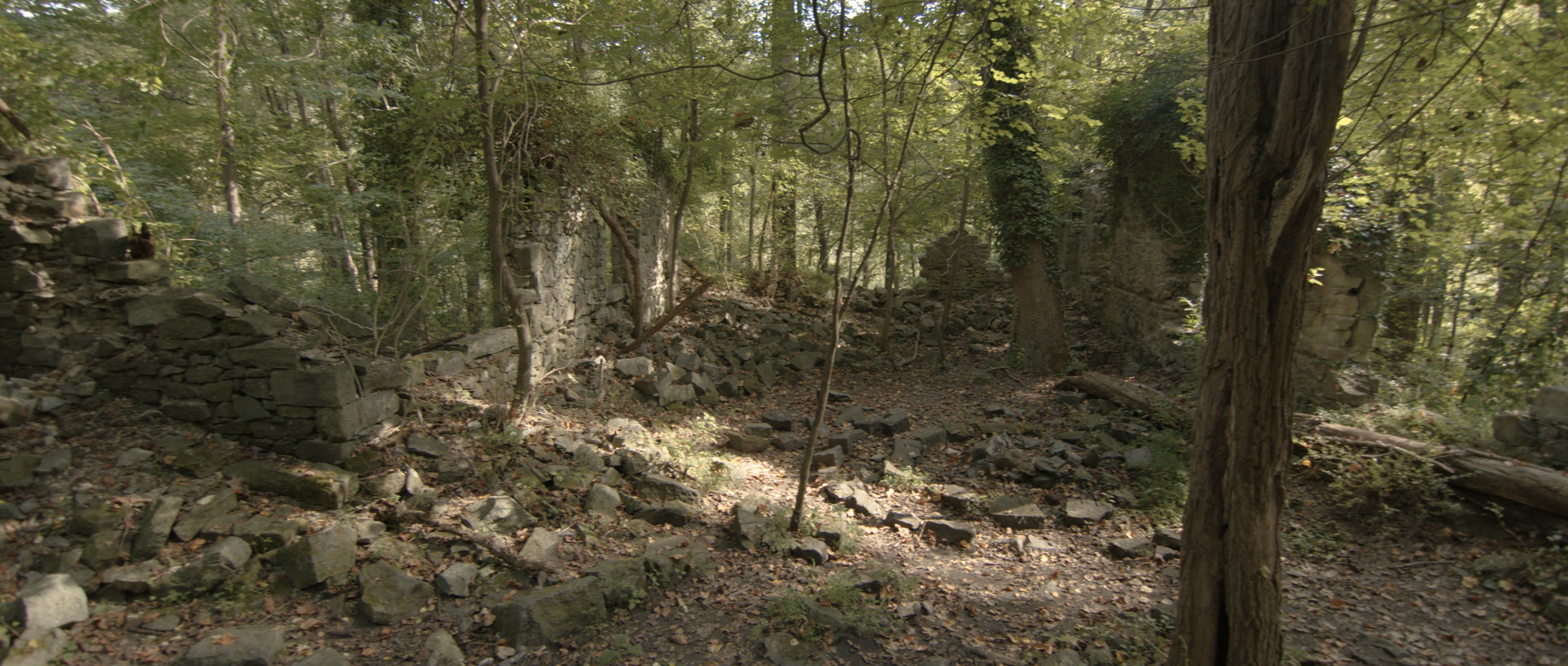

== Gallery ==
Views of Daniels, Maryland

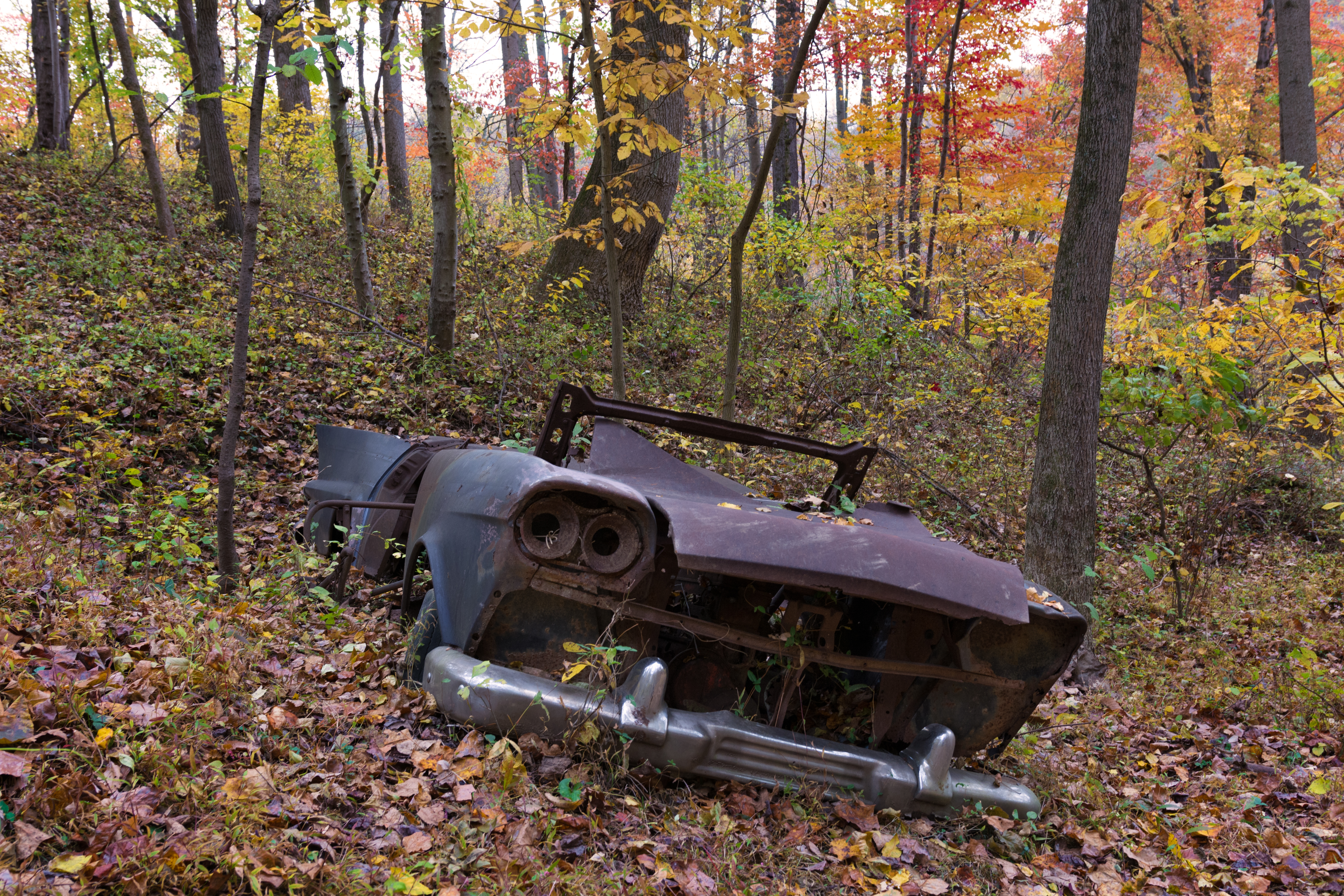
An abandoned car

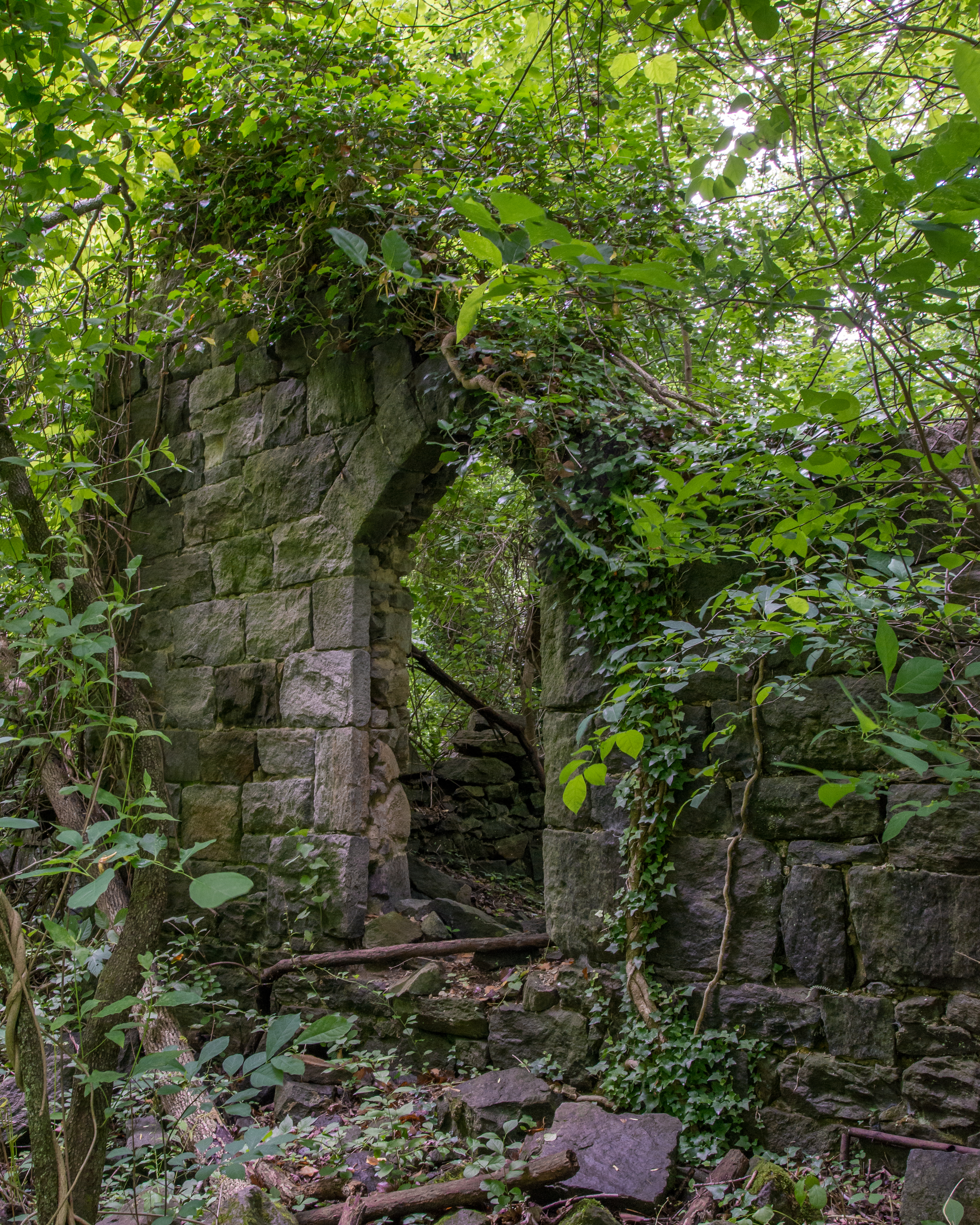
The Saint Stanislaus Kostka Catholic Church

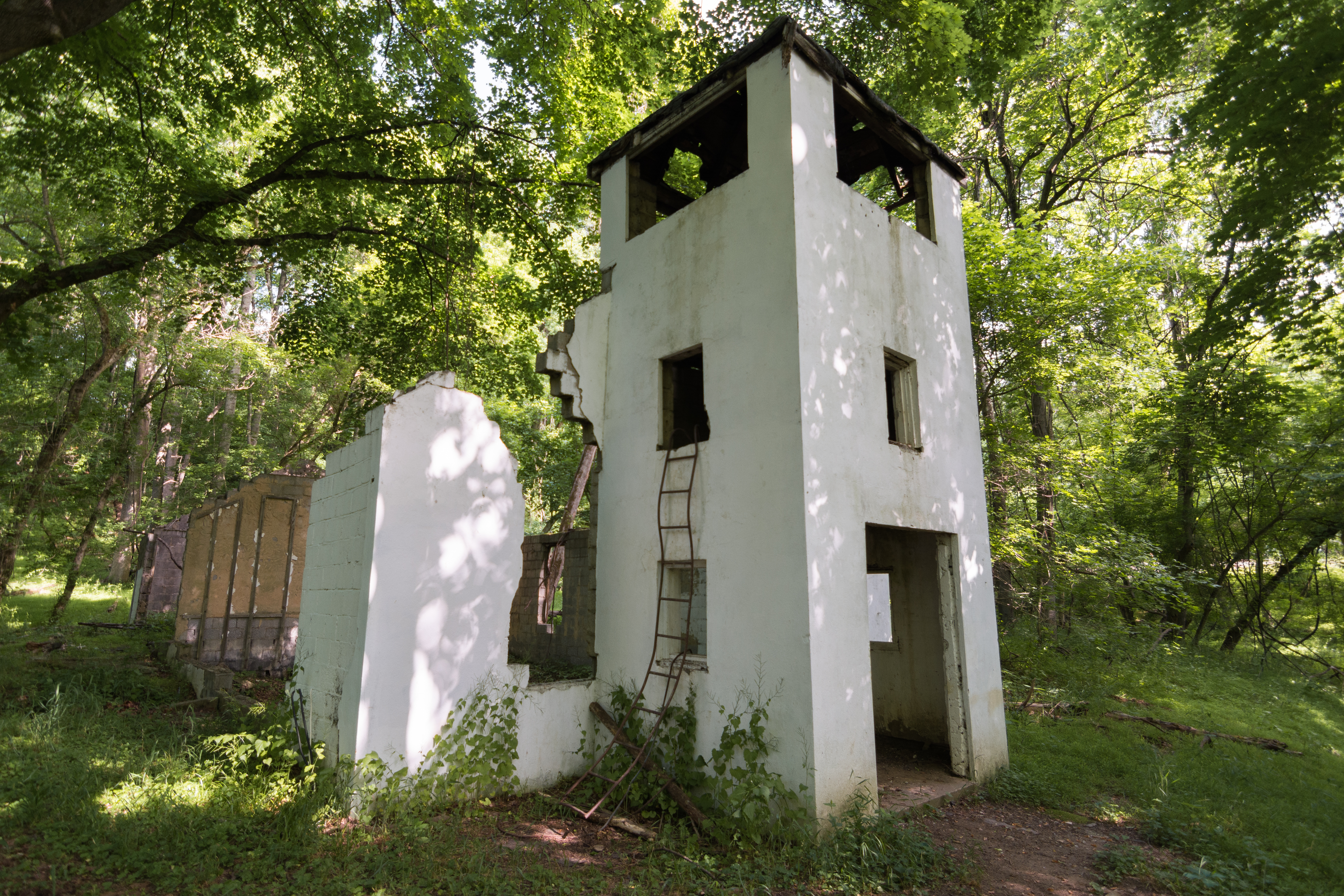
The Pentecostal Holiness Church

== See also ==
- Daniels Mill
- Elysville, Maryland
- Alberton, Maryland
- List of ghost towns in Maryland
