= Vindex, Maryland =

Vindex, Maryland may refer to the following places in Western Maryland:

- East Vindex, Maryland
- West Vindex, Maryland
