= Kempton Park =

Kempton Park may refer to:

- Kempton Park, Gauteng, a city on the East Rand, South Africa
  - Kempton Park (House of Assembly of South Africa constituency)
- Kempton Park, Surrey, a district in the borough of Spelthorne, Surrey, UK, adjacent to Sunbury-on-Thames
  - Kempton Park Racecourse, a horse racing track in Sunbury-on-Thames
  - Kempton Park railway station, a railway station in Sunbury-on-Thames
  - Kempton Park Steam Engines, two very large triple-expansion steam pumping engines formerly used to supply north London with drinking water

== See also ==
- Kempton (disambiguation)
