= Kempton =

Kempton may refer to:

== Places ==
=== Australia ===
- Kempton, Tasmania, a township in Tasmania, Australia

=== England ===
- Kempton, Shropshire, a village in the west of England
- Kempton, a former manor and hamlet, now part of Sunbury-on-Thames, Surrey in the southeast of England
- Kempton, an English local nature reserve in Hounslow, London

=== United States ===
- Kempton, Illinois, a village in Ford County
- Kempton, Indiana, a town in Tipton County
- Kempton, Maryland, a ghost town in Mayland
- Kempton, North Dakota, an unincorporated community in Grand Forks County
- Kempton, Pennsylvania, a town in Berks County

== Other uses ==
- Kempton (name)
