= Frankville, Maryland =

Ghost town in Garrett County, Maryland

Coordinates: 39.49478°N 79.16578°W

Frankville is a ghost town in Garrett County, Maryland. The geography of Frankville is largely mountainous.

== History ==
Frankville was settled and a post office established at some point prior to 1853. In 1853, the Frankville Road Company was incorporated by law. In 1856, Frankville included 2 sawmills and 17 residences. Frankville was located near Floyd, and at one time around the turn of the 20th century housed a rail station on the Baltimore and Ohio Railroad. There were still residents recorded in Frankville in 1912.

== Death of Francis Thomas ==
One of the more notable events to happen in Frankville was the death of Francis Thomas, who was the Governor of Maryland from 1842 to 1845. Thomas was struck by a train while walking alongside railroad tracks in Frankville. He had come to Frankville in 1820 to practice law. On the afternoon of January 22, 1876, Thomas was walking along railroad tracks near his home, when he was run over by an eastbound engine of the B&O Railroad, crushing his skull before ejecting his body from the track. The stretch of track where Thomas had been walking contained a sharp curve, preventing Thomas or the engineer from seeing each other coming.

== See also ==
- Blooming Rose, Maryland
- List of ghost towns in Maryland
- List of American railroad accidents
