= Harrison, West Virginia =

Harrison, West Virginia may refer to:

- Harrison, Clay County, West Virginia, an unincorporated community in Clay County
- Harrison, Mineral County, West Virginia, an unincorporated community in Mineral County

== See also ==
- Harrison County, West Virginia
