= Kempten (disambiguation) =

Kempten is a town in Bavaria, Germany.

Kempten may also refer to:

- Kempten, Switzerland, a village in Wetzikon, Zürich, Switzerland
- Free Imperial City of Kempten, a free city in the Holy Roman Empire
- Kempten am Rhein, a district of Bingen am Rhein

== See also ==
- Kempten railway station (disambiguation)
- Kempton (disambiguation)
- Kempten Abbey, an abbey and state of the Holy Roman Empire
