= Kempt =

Kempt may refer to:

== People ==
- George Kempt (1821–1885), Ontario businessman and political figure
- James Kempt (1765–1854), British Army officer, Lieutenant Governor of Nova Scotia, and Governor General of British North America

== Toponyms ==
=== Canada ===
- Kempt Lake (Matawinie), Matawinie Regional County Municipality, Lanaudière, Quebec
- Kempt, Nova Scotia, a community in the Region of Queens Municipality
- Kempt Shore, Nova Scotia, a small community, in The Municipality of the District of West Hants in Hants County
- Kempt Head, Nova Scotia, a small community in Victoria County on Boularderie Island
- Kempt Road, Nova Scotia, a small community in Richmond County on Cape Breton Island

=== Switzerland ===
- Kempt, a tributary of the Töss (river) in the canton of Zurich

== See also ==
- Kempten (disambiguation)
