= Williams' Conquest =

Historic house in Maryland, United States

- U.S. National Register of Historic Places
- Location within Maryland Location within the United States
- Location: Charles Cannon Road, Marion Station, Maryland
- Coordinates: 38°4′23″N 75°45′43″W
- Area: 13.1 acres (5.3 ha)
- Built: 1733
- NRHP reference No.: 84001886
- Added to NRHP: May 3, 1984

Williams' Conquest, also known as Williams' Green, is a historic home located at Marion Station, Somerset County, Maryland, United States. It is a 1 1/2-story Flemish bond brick house constructed about 1733 on Gales Creek. Additions occurred between 1825 and 1850 with the frame kitchen with an exterior chimney on the gable end, and a smaller utility wing added in 1968. The house represent the first phase of permanent Somerset County buildings that have survived to modern times.

Williams' Conquest was listed on the National Register of Historic Places in 1984.
