= Daniels Mill (Daniels, Maryland) =

Historic district in Maryland, United States

- U.S. National Register of Historic Places
- U.S. Historic district
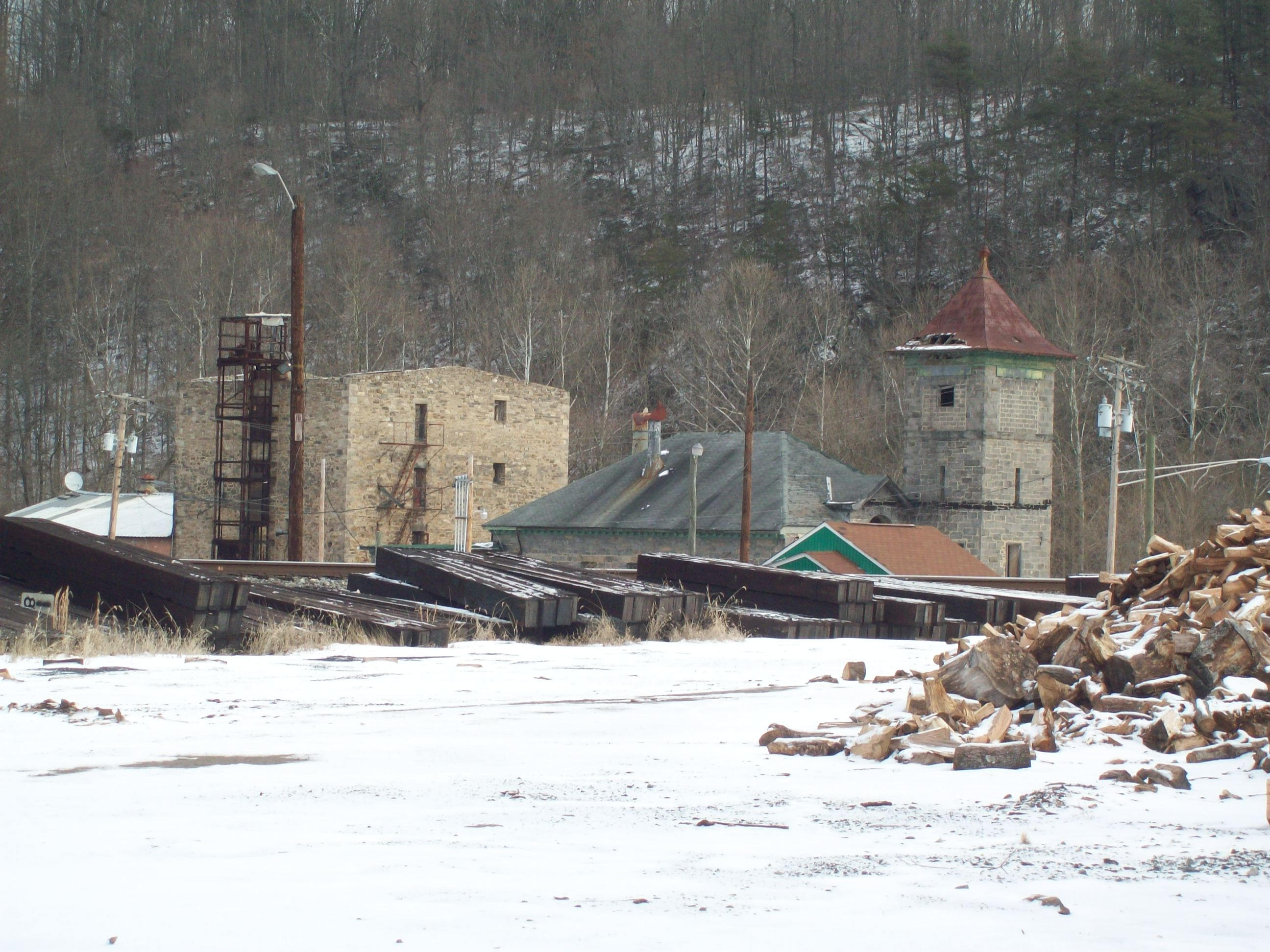
- Daniels Mill, January 2011

- Location within Maryland Location within the United States
- Location: Daniels Rd., Daniels, Maryland
- Coordinates: 39°19′2″N 76°48′47″W
- Area: 105 acres (42 ha)
- Built: 1845
- Architectural style: Gothic, Romanesque
- NRHP reference No.: 73000929
- Added to NRHP: April 11, 1973

Daniels Mill is a historic mill complex located at Daniels, Howard County, Maryland, in a sheltered, wooded valley of the upper Patapsco River. The complex consists of seven early industrial structures, several concrete block and brick structures of 20th century date, and Gary Memorial United Methodist Church, a granite church built in the High Victorian Gothic style with an off-center tower entrance on the west gable. South of the church is a small cemetery.

In the 19th century, an industrial village existed on the site, including stores, a railroad station, a school and several mill workers' houses. The large majority of these supportive structures were demolished in the 1960s. The Elysville Manufacturing Company was incorporated in 1829, by Thomas Ely, to manufacture cotton textiles. The mill was erected between August 1845 and spring 1846. It was acquired by the Oskiska Manufacturing Company which went bankrupt, then by the Alberton Manufacturing Company in 1853, and the mill village was called Alberton at least through the 1870s. The mill was then acquired in the 1860s by James S. Gary, who created still another firm which operated the mill until the 1940s, when the C.R. Daniels Company took control.

C.R. Daniels was a New York-based company founded in 1918 that manufactured sail cloth material. The company purchased the 500-acre Daniels mill and 118 houses in 1940 for $65,000, doubling its size by 1950, and eventually over 300,000 sq ft. The company produced a wide variety of canvas products and canvas covers with over 200 sewing machines to assemble patterns. Later specialties included fiberglass components and conveyor belts. In 1965, the mill phased out company housing, tearing down the historic buildings and churches. In 1972, flooding from Hurricane Agnes damaged or destroyed the majority of the buildings and mill site. In 1977 a fire destroyed the remainder of the mill.

It was listed on the National Register of Historic Places in 1973.

== See also ==
- List of Howard County properties in the Maryland Historical Trust
- Elysville, Maryland

== Gallery ==
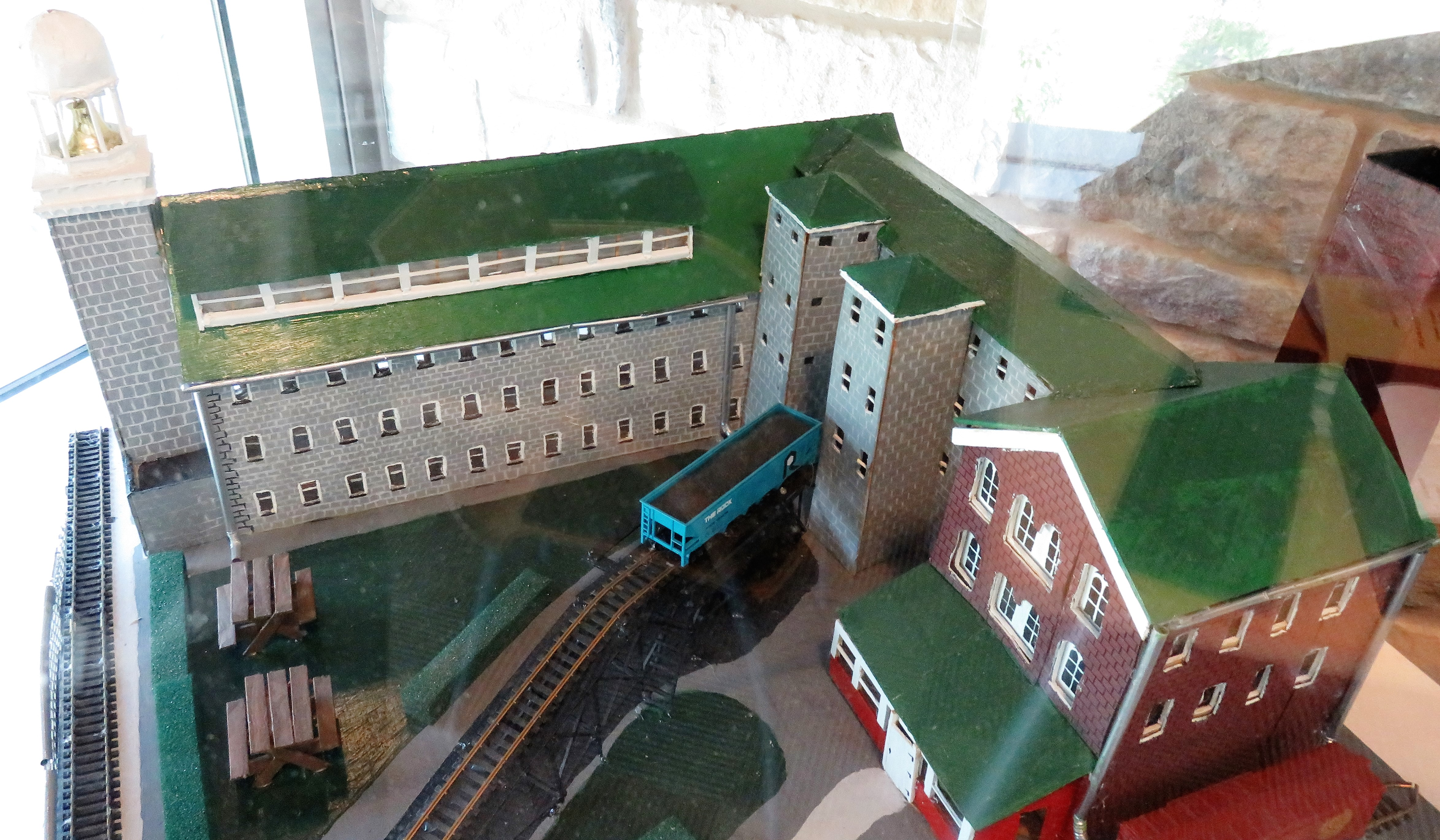
Model of Daniels Mill

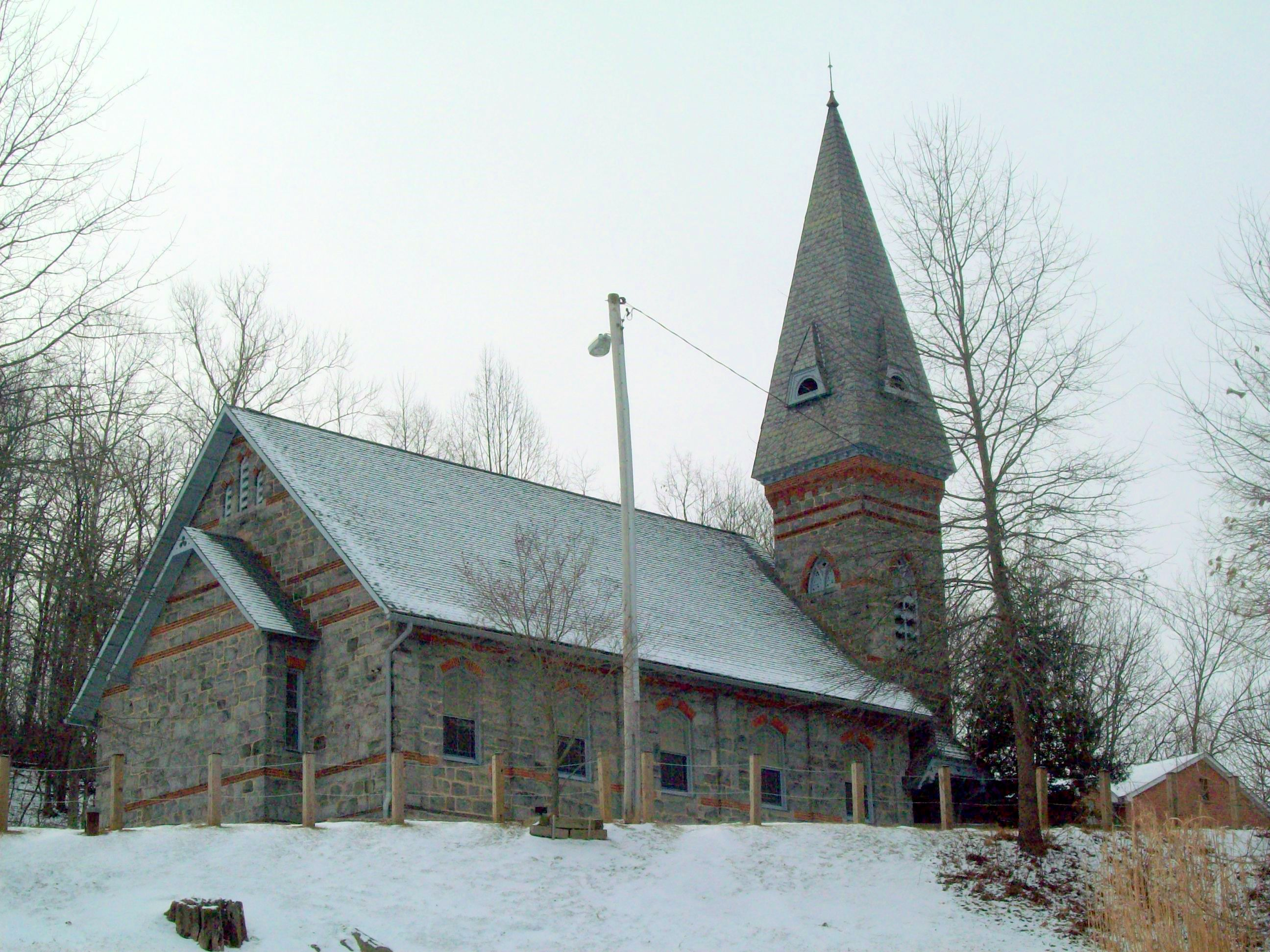
Gary Memorial United Methodist Church, January 2011
