= Kempton (name) =

Kempton is both an English surname and a given name. Notable people with the name include:

Surname:

- Adam Kempton (born 1957) Australian politician
- Arthur Kempton (1889–1958), English footballer
- David Kempton (born 1956), Australian politician
- George Kempton (1871–1945), Australian politician
- Gloria Kempton (1951–1991) American author
- Greta Kempton (1901–1991) Austrian-born American artist
- Jenny Twitchell Kempton (1835–1921), American classical contralto
- Murray Kempton (1917–1997) American journalist
- Tim Kempton (born 1964) American professional basketball player

Given name:

- Kempton Bunton (1900–1976) British disabled pensioner who allegedly stole a Francisco Goya painting
- Kempton Greene (1890–1966) American silent film actor

Fictional characters:

- Dane Kempton, elderly poet in the 1903 novel The Kempton-Wace Letters by Jack London and Anna Strunsky
- Jack Kempton, fictional character in Best Friends Together
