= Tulls Corner, Maryland =

Unincorporated community in Maryland, United States

- Unincorporated community
- Location within Maryland
- Coordinates: 38°00′55″N 75°45′15″W
- Country: United States
- State: Maryland
- County: Somerset
- Elevation: 3 ft (0.91 m)
- Time zone: UTC-5 (Eastern (EST))
  - Summer (DST): UTC-4 (EDT)
- ZIP code: 21838
- Area codes: 410, 443, and 667
- GNIS feature ID: 591438

Tulls Corner is an unincorporated community in Somerset County, Maryland, United States. Tulls Corner is at the intersection of Tulls Corner Road and L.Q. Powell Road, south-southeast of Marion Station.

== History ==
Tulls Corner is in Quindocqua, just west of Quindocqua United Methodist Church, at the intersection of Tulls Corner Road and L.Q. Powell Road, near Marion Station. At one time it was a busy, flourishing, self-sustaining center of activity with numerous homes and places of business.

Tulls Corner started originally from a crossroads store prior to the Revolutionary War and expanded gradually until it reached its height shortly after the end of the American Civil War. It is named after the Tull family, who evidently came to Somerset County c. 1666 from Northampton County, Virginia. Thomas Tull IV (1750-1818) created the settlement, which became known as Tulls Corner. He owned a gristmill and became a farmer and ship owner. At that time, the settlement consisted of several homes, three or four stores, a post office, shoe shop, blacksmith shop, tannery, and a nearby school and church. Later a saloon, millinery shop, barrel factory, tomato cannery and other businesses were added. After its heyday, it declined into obscurity. The Tulls are completely gone from the area and the name of the community is almost extinct.

St. Paul's Protestant Episcopal Church was listed on the National Register of Historic Places in 1990.
