= Lankford House =

Historic house in Maryland, United States

- U.S. National Register of Historic Places
- Location within Maryland Location within the United States
- Location: Maryland Route 667, Marion, Maryland
- Coordinates: 38°3′4″N 75°42′21″W
- Area: 15.5 acres (6.3 ha)
- Built: 1798
- NRHP reference No.: 84001870
- Added to NRHP: August 9, 1984

Lankford House, also known as Anderson House, is a historic home located at Marion, Somerset County, Maryland. It is a two-story, four-bay, single-pile frame house constructed between 1834 and 1840. It features well executed, Greek Revival trim and woodwork. A single story frame hyphen connects the main house to a frame kitchen built about 1798. Also on the property is the 19th century Lankford family burial plot and frame smokehouse.

It was listed on the National Register of Historic Places in 1984.
