= Wilson (ghost town), Calvert County, Maryland =

Wilson, Maryland
- Ghost town
- Location within Maryland
- Coordinates: 38°44′15″N 76°37′34″W
- Country: United States
- State: Maryland
- County: Calvert
- Elevation: 112 ft (34 m)
- GNIS feature ID: 1676134

Wilson is a ghost town in Calvert County, Maryland, United States. Wilson was located in northern Calvert County along what is now Maryland Route 260, 2.15 miles (3.46 km) northeast of Dunkirk. Wilson appeared on USGS maps as late as 1901.
