= Pomfret Plantation =

Historic house in Maryland, United States

- U.S. National Register of Historic Places
- Location within Maryland Location within the United States
- Location: Old Rehobeth Road (MD 667), Marion, Maryland
- Coordinates: 38°2′31″N 75°48′6″W
- Area: 72.3 acres (29.3 ha)
- Built: 1810
- Architectural style: Federal
- NRHP reference No.: 84001874
- Added to NRHP: September 7, 1984

Pomfret Plantation is a historic house located at Marion, Somerset County, Maryland, United States. It is a two-story, four room plan gable roofed frame house constructed between 1810 and 1830. A two-story hyphen joins an early 19th-century kitchen wing to the main block. The property also includes a post-Civil War frame tenant house, and a 19th-century Coulbourne family cemetery. The Coulbourne family and their descendants owned the property through nine continuous generations beginning with William Coulbourne in 1663, and ending with the sale of the farm in 1921.

The Pomfret Plantation was listed on the National Register of Historic Places in 1984.
