= Spring Bank Farm =

Historic house in Maryland, United States

- Spring Bank
- U.S. National Register of Historic Places
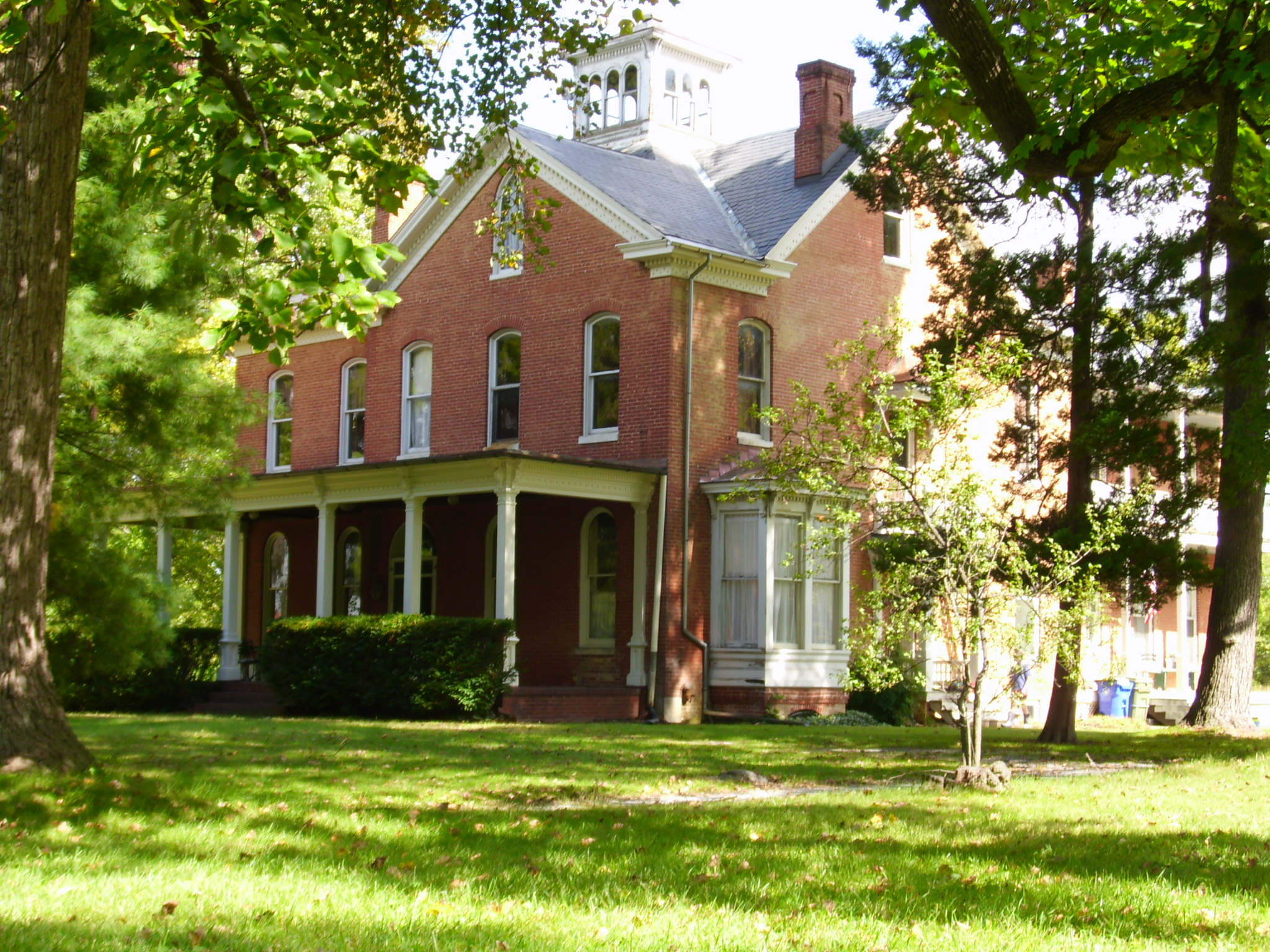

- Location within Maryland Location within the United States
- Location: 7945 Worman's Mill Rd., Frederick, Maryland
- Coordinates: 39°27′10″N 77°23′56″W
- Area: 10.4 acres (4.2 ha)
- Built: 1880
- Built by: Walter, Charles G.
- Architectural style: Late Gothic Revival, Italianate
- NRHP reference No.: 84001772
- Added to NRHP: September 7, 1984

Spring Bank Farm is a large house, built in 1880 near Frederick, Maryland in the small community of Harmony Grove. The house combines Gothic Revival and Italianate architecture. The house retains much of its historic detailing and interior fabric, as well as a number of outbuildings.

The Spring Bank Farm was listed on the National Register of Historic Places in 1984.
