= Lapidum, Maryland =

Coordinates: 39°35′52″N 76°07′44″W

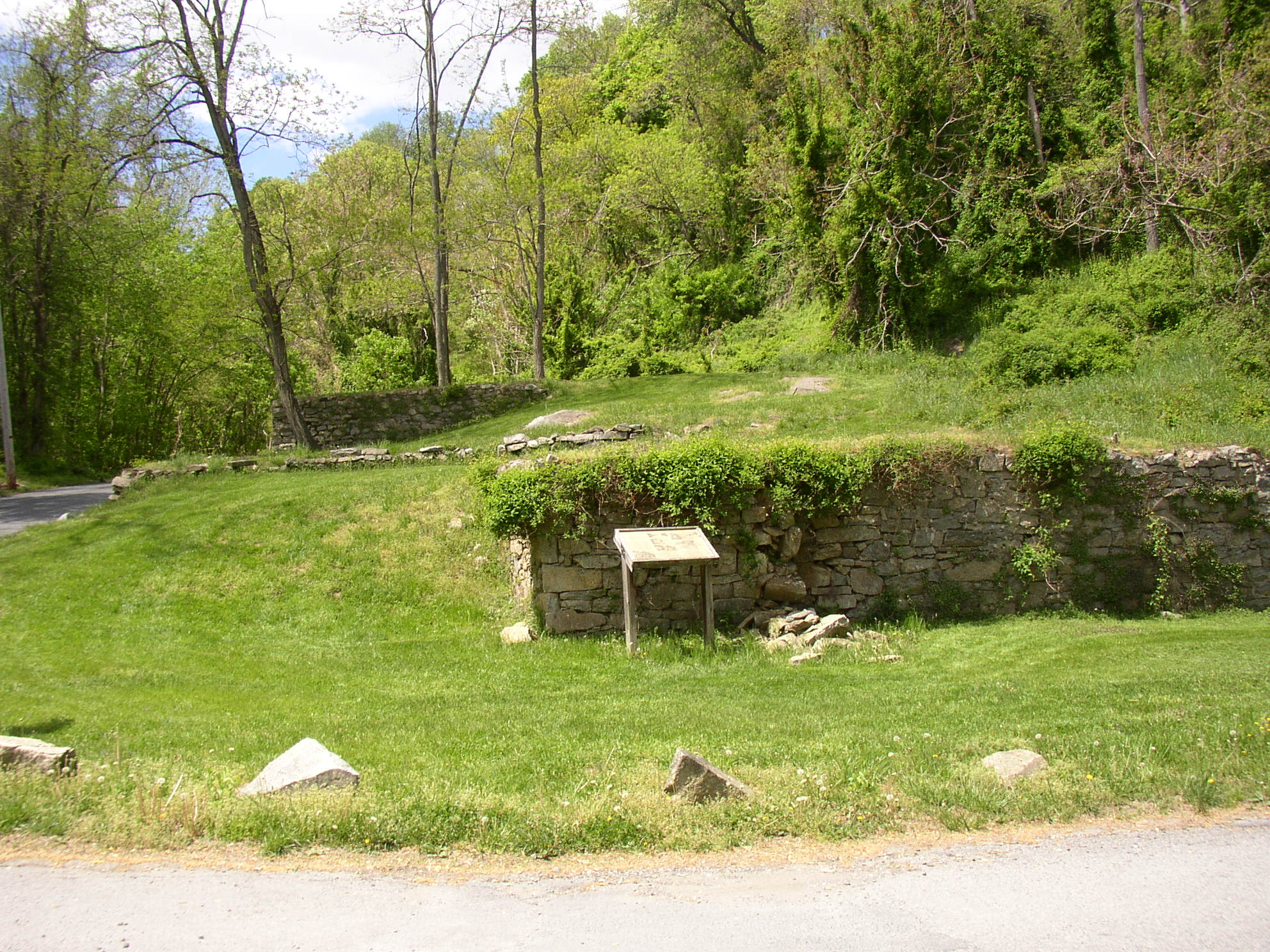
Foundation of former hotel in Lapidum.

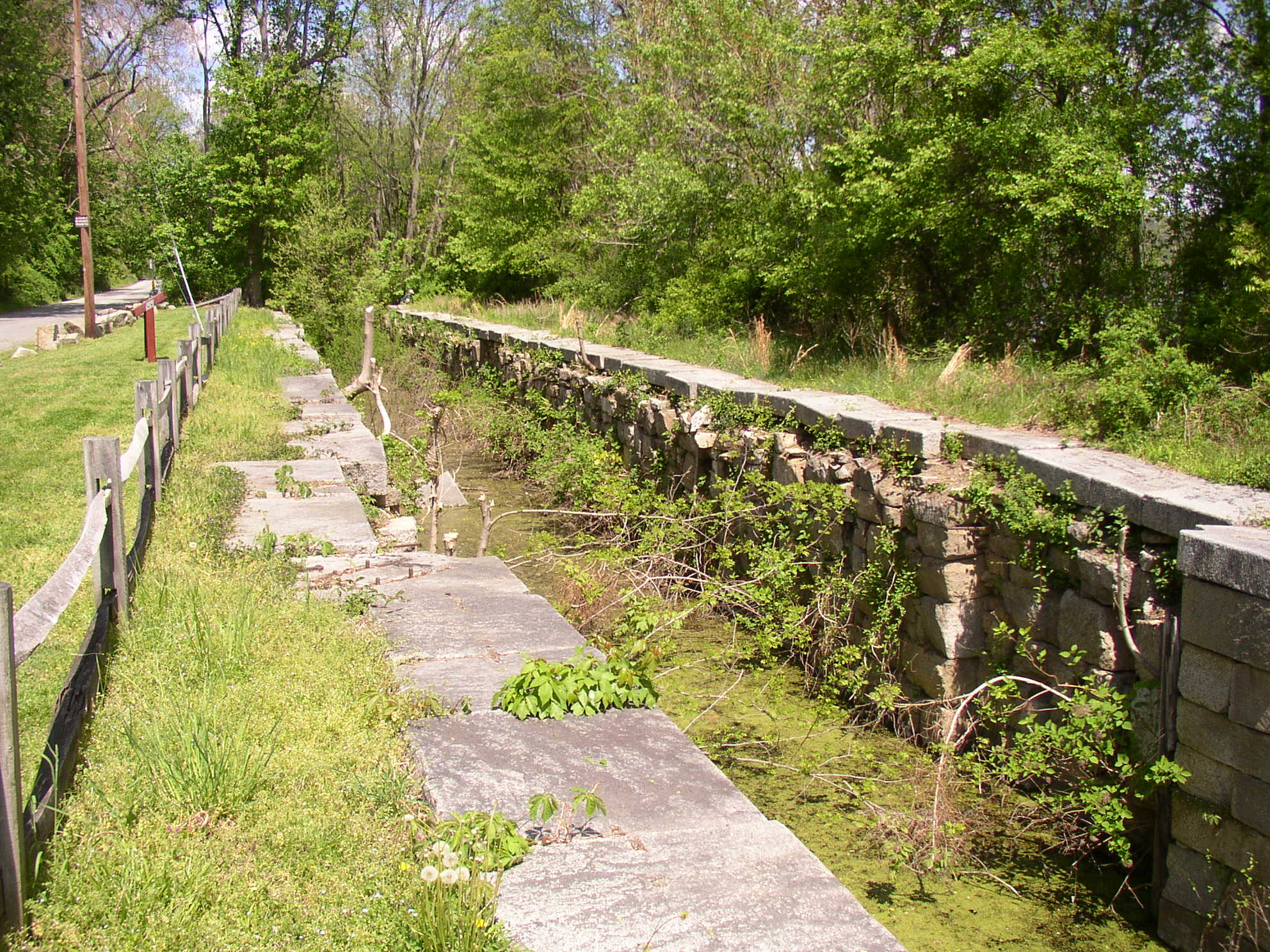
Lock 9 at Lapidum on the former Tidewater Canal.

Lapidum is a ghost town in Harford County, Maryland, USA, located at the head of navigation of the Susquehanna River on the west bank across from Port Deposit.

== History ==
=== 17th century ===
Lapidum traces its history to the granting of early land patents for the tracts known as "Eightrapp" (1665), "Faton" (1679) and "Land of Promise" (1684). As settlers transformed the surrounding land from forest to farmland the area grew in importance as a commercial center. Fields of corn and tobacco were grown on land near the river, and an important fishing industry also developed, based on the runs of shad and herring.

=== 18th century ===
A ferry was established between this point and Port Deposit in the 1720s and operated until the completion of the bridge from Port Deposit to the Rock Run Mill just upstream of Lapidum in 1818. In 1729, Thomas Cresap established a regular ferry service near Smith's Falls (in the upper Port Deposit area) crossing the Susquehanna to Lapidum; this was referred to as Smith's Ferry or Upper Ferry (there was a lower ferry at the mouth of the Susquehanna River just off the Chesapeake Bay). In 1731, a road from Susquehanna Upper Ferry toward Philadelphia, as far as the jurisdiction extends, was authorized. In the same year, in the jurisdiction south of the river, a petition was submitted for a road from the mill at Rock Run just above Lapidum to Peach Bottom, Pennsylvania. This upper ferry came to be known as "Creswell's Ferry."

=== 19th century ===
A three-story Victorian building, the Susquehanna Hotel, was built here by Conrad Baker in 1868. It was constructed of stone, brick and framed with lumber, and included several large porches. Other buildings included a church, a mill, a Masonic hall, a school, and numerous houses, stores and warehouses as well as wharves to serve the trade from goods being brought down the Susquehanna River or by road from the adjacent countryside to be loaded onto ships.

Lapidum profited from the financial success of the ferry, the Susquehanna and Tidewater Canal, and from its location as one of the highest deepwater landings for Chesapeake Bay shipping.

=== 20th century ===
By 1900, the sources of Lapidum's commerce and prosperity were lost to railroad competition. Ice accumulations (referred to locally as "ice gorges") eventually destroyed the warehouses and wharves. The hotel continued as a fishing lodge and men's club until the 1960s, when it was torn down.

The land is currently part of Susquehanna State Park in Maryland.

== See also ==
- List of ghost towns in Maryland
