= Arthur Kempton =

English footballer (1889–1958)

Personal information
- Full name: Arthur Richard Kempton
- Date of birth: 29 January 1889
- Place of birth: West Thurrock, England
- Date of death: December 1958 (aged 69)
- Place of death: Reading, England
- Position: Goalkeeper

Senior career*
Years	Team	Apps	(Gls)
–1913	Hastings & St Leonards United		
1913–1914	Tufnell Park		
1914–1921	Arsenal	0	(0)
1921–1922	Reading	9	(0)
- Folkestone
- Tunbridge Wells Rangers
- * Club domestic league appearances and goals

Arthur Richard Kempton (29 January 1889 – December 1958) was an English professional footballer who played as a goalkeeper in the Football League for Reading. In 2018, he was named in the RAF XI.

== Personal life ==
Kempton worked as a carpenter. In July 1916, two years after the outbreak of the First World War, he enlisted as an Air Mechanic 2nd Class in the Royal Flying Corps. By September 1918, Kempton had been promoted to corporal. Nearly 18 months after the armistice, he was discharged from the RAF Reserve in April 1920.

== Career statistics ==
Appearances and goals by club, season and competition
Club	Season	League			FA Cup		Total	
Club	Season	Division	Apps	Goals	Apps	Goals	Apps	Goals
Arsenal	1914–15	Second Division	0	0	1	0	1	0
Reading	1921–22	Third Division South	9	0	1	0	10	0
Career total			9	0	2	0	11	0
