= St. Paul's Protestant Episcopal Church (Tulls Corner, Maryland) =

Historic church in Maryland, United States

- U.S. National Register of Historic Places
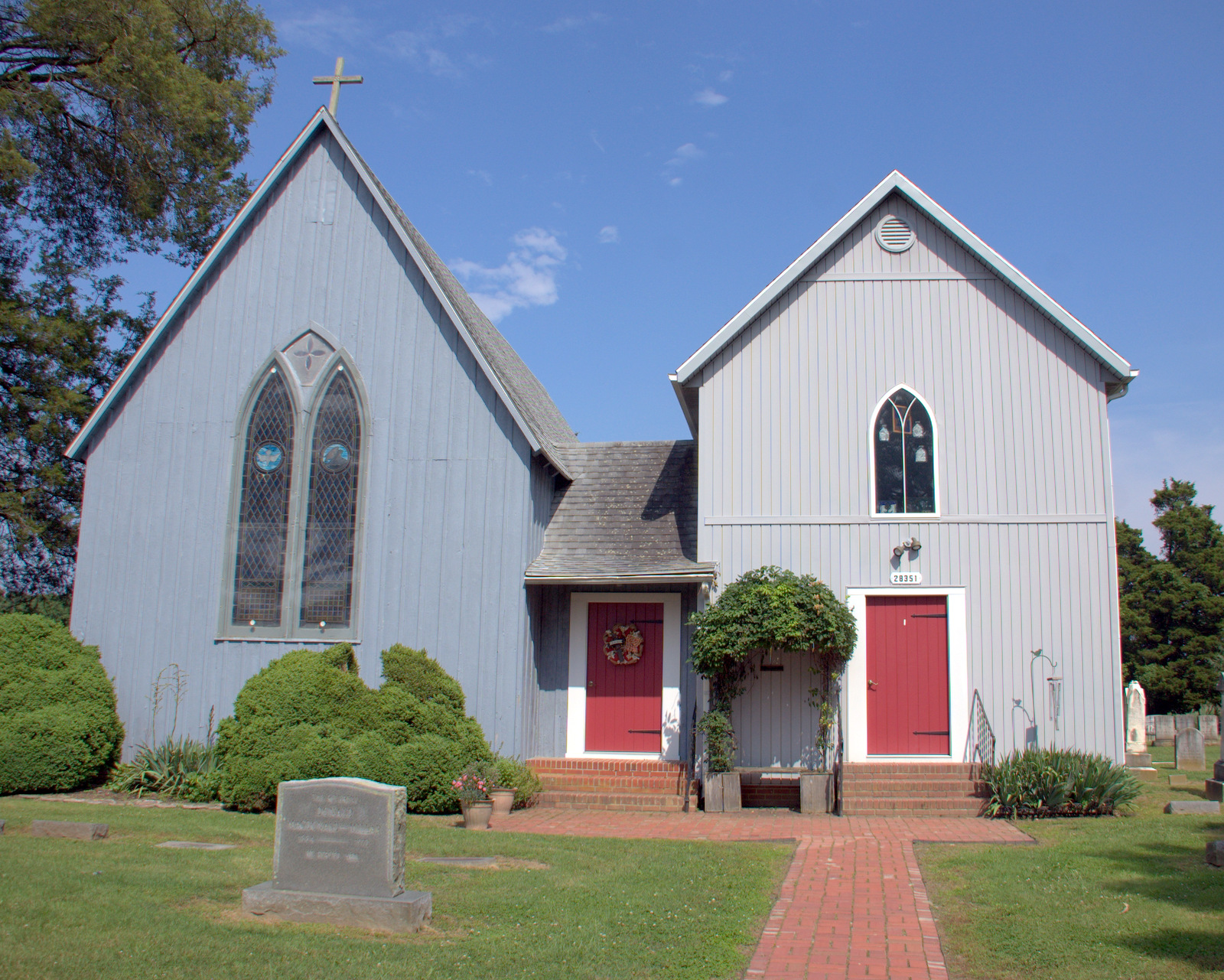

- Location within Maryland Location within the United States
- Location: Near the junction of Farm Market Rd. and St. Pauls Church Rd., Tulls Corner, Maryland
- Coordinates: 38°0′56″N 75°46′14″W
- Area: 2.5 acres (1.0 ha)
- Built: 1848
- Built by: Marshall, Issac T.
- Architectural style: Gothic Revival
- NRHP reference No.: 90001153
- Added to NRHP: August 3, 1990

St. Paul's Protestant Episcopal Church is a historic frame Episcopal church located at Tulls Corner, Somerset County, Maryland. Built in 1848, it is a Carpenter Gothic-style church sheathed with beveled-edge board-and-batten siding. Also on the property is a cemetery surrounded by an early-20th century iron fence.

It was listed on the National Register of Historic Places in 1990.
