= Watkins Point Farm =

Historic house in Maryland, United States

- U.S. National Register of Historic Places
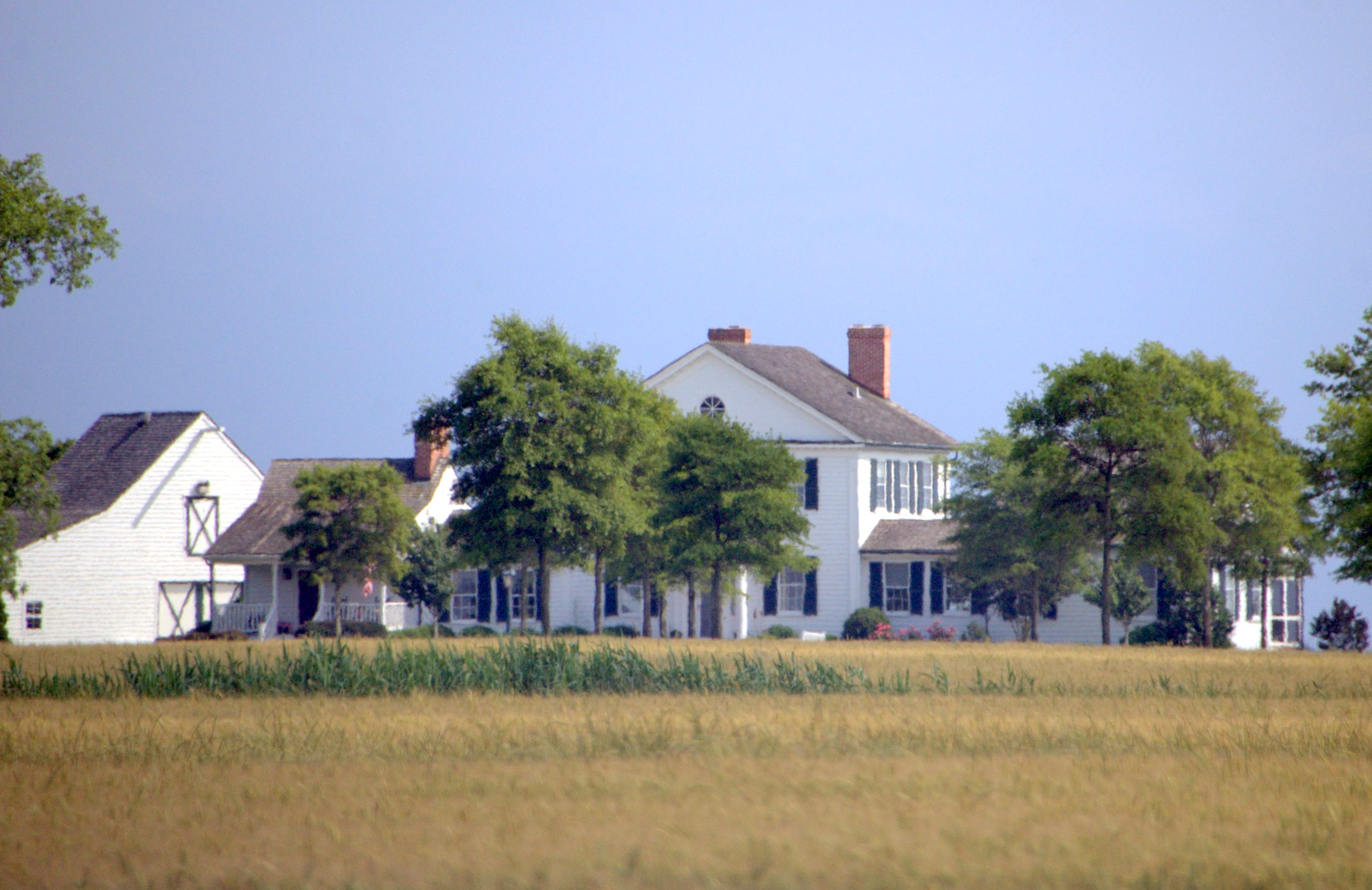

- Location within Maryland Location within the United States
- Location: 27737 Phoenix Church Road, Marion Station, Maryland
- Coordinates: 37°58′51″N 75°47′28″W
- Area: 0.5 acres (0.20 ha)
- Built: 1780
- Architectural style: Federal, Greek Revival
- NRHP reference No.: 02001586
- Added to NRHP: December 27, 2002

Watkins Point Farm, also known as the James L. Horsey Farm and John T. Adams Farm, is a historic home located at Marion Station, Somerset County, Maryland. It is a three-part frame and sawn log dwelling. The one-room plan sawn log house was erected around 1780-90 and is extended to the west by a single-story, mid-19th century hyphen that connects the two-story, transverse-hall plan main block, erected around 1850. The interiors retain large portions of original woodwork. Also on the property is a 20th-century rusticated-block potato house.

It was listed on the National Register of Historic Places in 2002.
