= Harmony Grove, Maryland =

Ghost town in Frederick County, Maryland

Coordinates: 39°27′13″N 77°23′57″W

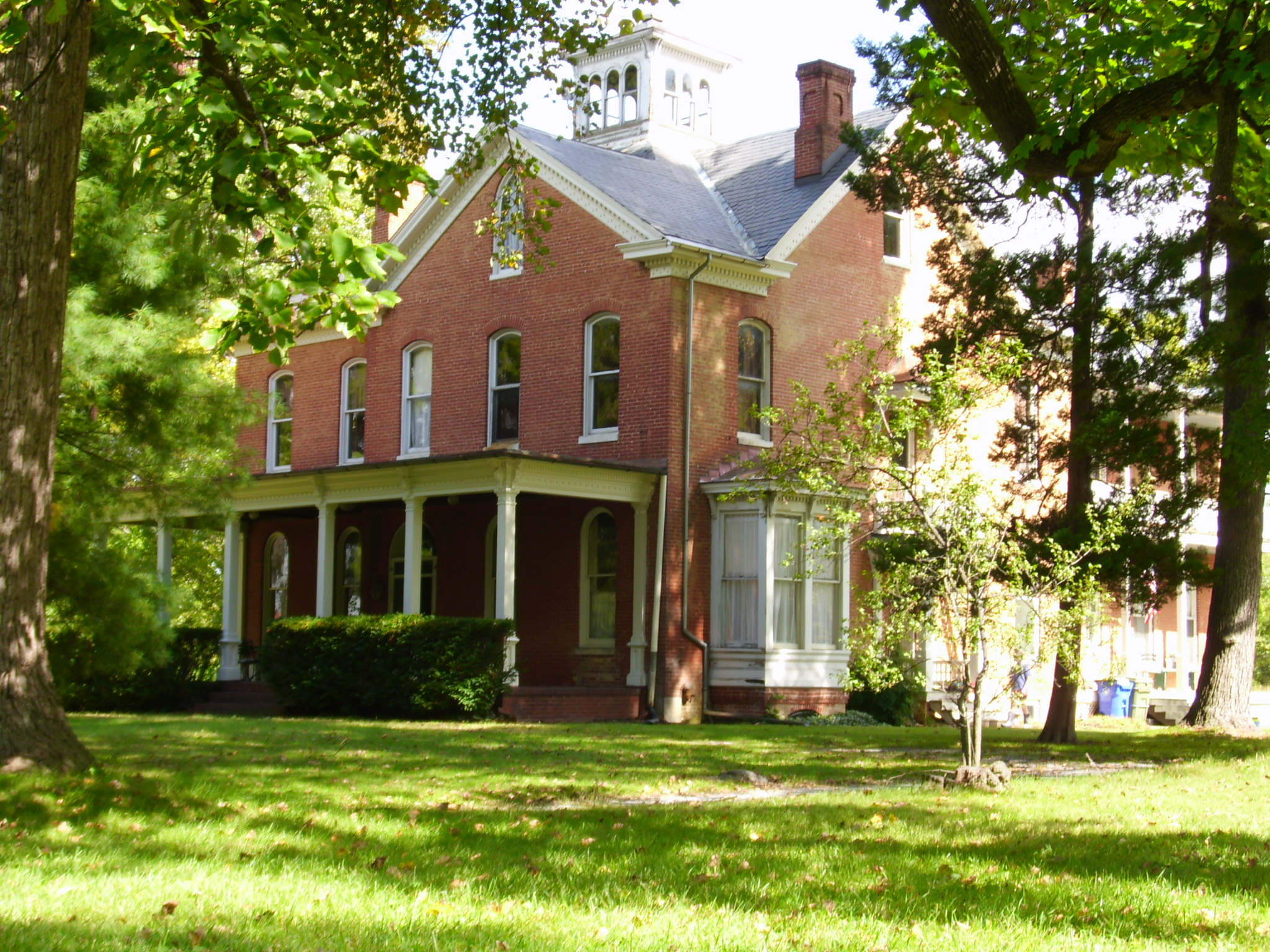
Photograph of Spring Bank taken 2009

Harmony Grove is a ghost town located close to U.S. Route 15, north of Frederick (city) in Frederick County, Maryland. Harmony Grove is considered part of the Piedmont region of Maryland.

== History ==
Harmony Grove first developed as a mill town in the early 19th century, starting around 1820 until the early 20th century. The town was developed around Worman's Mill, giving the main street of the town the name of Worman's Mill Road. In 1872, the Frederick & Pennsylvania Railroad connected the town to the larger towns of Frederick and Walkersville, increasing commercial trade in Harmony Grove. A post office was founded circa 1873, which closed in 1919. The building was demolished in the 1960s. A notable building in Harmony Grove was the Spring Bank Inn, which today stands in disrepair. A schoolhouse was built in 1876, and was closed in 1910 before being converted to a teahouse in 1915, then a private residence in 1940.

== Spring Bank Inn ==
The Spring Bank Inn was first included in the National Register of Historic Places in 1984 for its mix of Gothic Revival and Italianate architecture. Spring Bank Inn was constructed from bricks in 1880 as the country home of a wealthy businessman from Frederick. The construction of Spring Bank Inn signaled a shift in Harmony Grove from a working class town to a country home destination.

== Decline ==
At the end of the 19th century, the decline of the railroads eventually led to the closure and eventual demolition of the railroad buildings, but the town itself was not considered in decline until the closure of the school in 1910. Harmony Grove's population decreased sharply in the 1960s after the closure of the mill and post office. Many of the remaining buildings were later demolished to make room for a lane expansion on U.S. Route 15 during the 1970s. Other buildings have been lost to development throughout the years, particularly in the 20th century, including the railroad station, post office, and freight warehouse, as well as the stone Worman Mill. Today, Harmony Grove is mostly train tracks and foundations, although a few houses as well as the Spring Bank Inn remain standing, along with a church from 1878. The earliest standing structure is a log house from circa 1840, which may have been slave quarters for the Worman farm.

== See also ==
- List of ghost towns in Maryland
- National Register of Historic Places listings in Frederick County, Maryland
