= Kendall, Maryland =

Ghost town in Maryland, U.S.

Coordinates: 39°38′00″N 79°25′03″W

Kendall is a ghost town in Garrett County, Maryland. Kendall was originally known as Yough Manor, named after the first lumber company in the area. Kendall was a logging town founded in the mid 19th century.

== History ==
Kendall was used for logging since the mid 19th century. Appalachian Maryland is known for its old-growth forests, which were highly profitable for the industry. During the Civil War, the Kendall area played a crucial role in the Union supply chain. In 1889, railroads were opened that connected the Kendall area to nearby Friendsville, which were then extended further up river to service a sawmill. The community that sprung up around it was named Yough Manor, after the Yough Manor Lumber Company. In 1891 the town was renamed to Krug, for company official Henry Krug. In the early 1900s, it was renamed again to Kendall, after the Kendall Lumber Company. By the early 20th century, Kendall was known locally as a weekend vacation spot for residents of Friendsville.

== Geography ==
Kendall is located along the Youghiogheny River, upstream from Friendsville. Though there are no working railroads in Kendall anymore, Kendall used to be the southern terminus for the Confluence & Oakland Railroad, as well as the start of the Krug Lumber Railroad. A Historical Marker is located on a nature trail at the location of Kendall. The ruins themselves are located across the river from the trail.

== Decline ==
In 1912, the timber industry collapsed in Kendall, prompting residents to leave. Trains continued to ship coal, but the population of Kendall continued to decline. Most of the residents had left Kendall by the 1920s. Although a new company took up operations, the town never returned to full activity. By 1942, the railroad was rerouted through Confluence, to prepare for the filling of Yough Lake, which partially flooded the deserted town. Today, Kendall is mostly foundations.

== See also ==
- List of ghost towns in Maryland
