= Kempton, Maryland =

Coordinates: 39°12′24″N 79°29′07″W

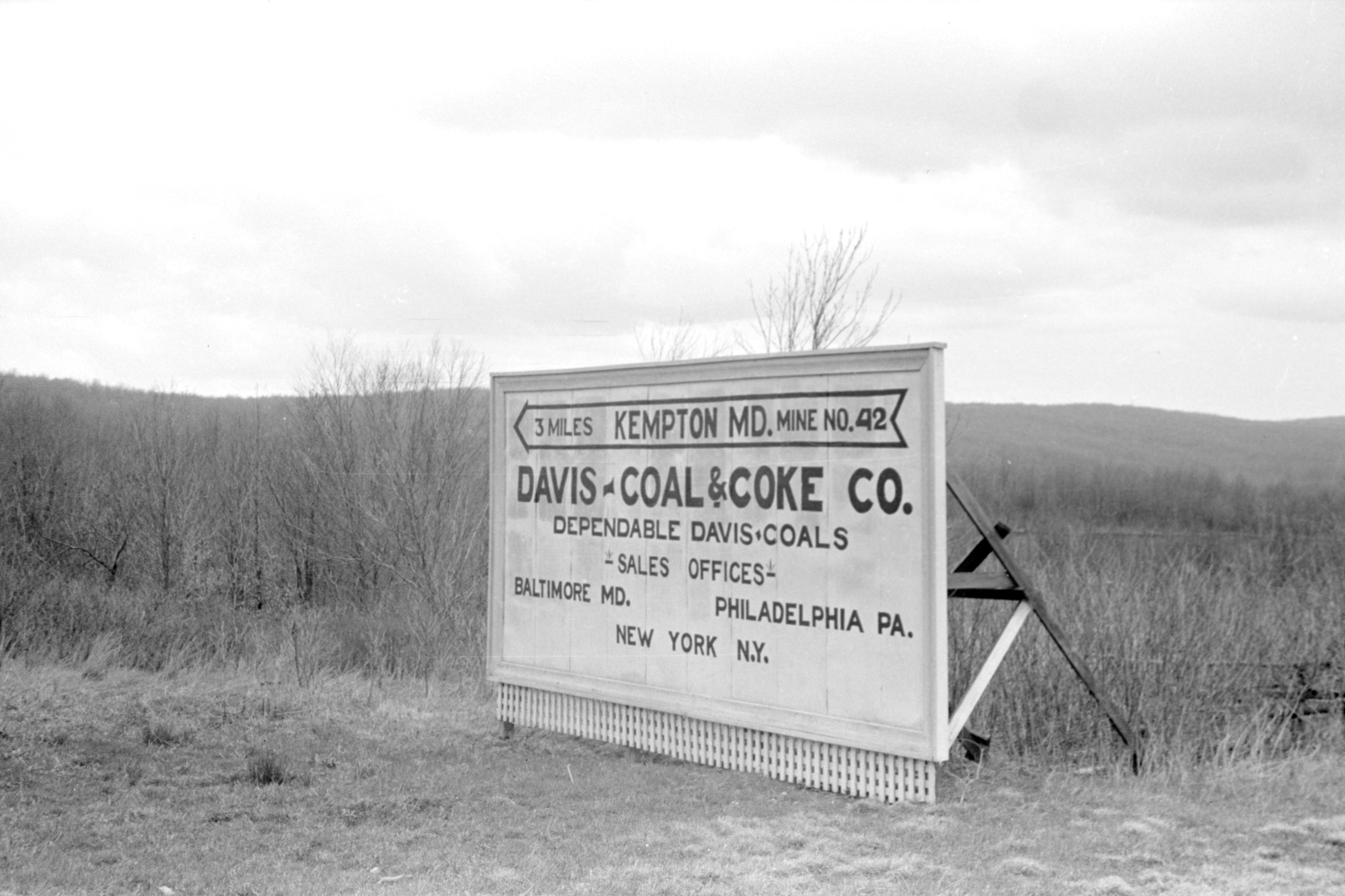
Entrance sign to Kempton, ca. 1939

Kempton is a ghost town in Garrett County, Maryland. Kempton is also partially located in Tucker County, West Virginia.

== Geography ==
Kempton is located on the North Branch Potomac River, which feeds the larger Potomac River. Runoff from human activity at Kempton feeds the wetlands at Laurel Run. Kempton contains a vast mining complex, much of which has been reforested. Mining at Kempton takes up more than 7,680 acres of land. Kempton is partially located in Tucker County, West Virginia, close to Thomas. The location of the town is nearby to several notable natural sites, such as Blackwater Falls State Park and the Dolly Sods Wilderness.

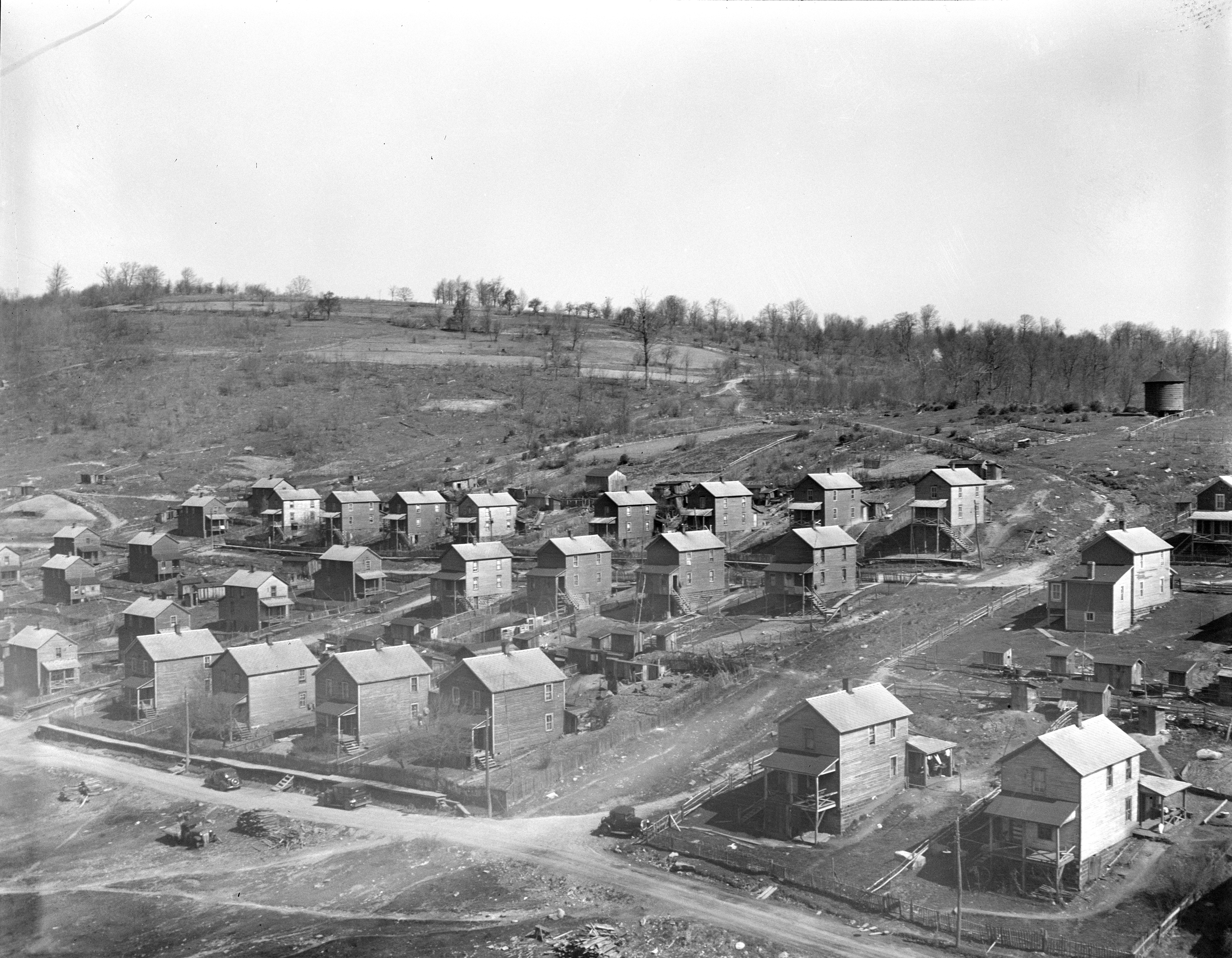
Dwellings at Kempton, ca. 1939

== History ==
Kempton was founded in 1913 as a company town of the coal industry. Kempton was founded by the Davis Coal and Coke Company. In 1915, mining operations began at Kempton Mine Company, a subsidiary of Davis C&C Company. By the 1930s, Kempton's population had grown to approximately 900 residents. In 1950, the main mine, Mine No.42, closed unexpectedly.

== Decline ==
After the mining industry dried up during the 1950s following unexpected mine closures, the population of Kempton declined sharply. As of 2003, a small number of residents remain in old company housing at Kempton. Over the years, mining at Kempton has put significant strain on the local watershed. The mining complexes at Kempton are the most significant contributor to acid mine drainage (AMD) on the North Branch, which used to house thriving trout and bass industries. After the closure of Mine No.42 in 1950, lack of maintenance on the abandoned mines caused large amounts of AMD into surrounding waterways. In 1977, the Surface Mining Control and Reclamation Act was passed to help regulate the environmental impacts of both active and abandoned coal mines. By this time, many of the mines were abandoned and Kempton had already been a ghost town for several years.

== See also ==
- List of ghost towns in Maryland
