= Alberton, Maryland =

Unincorporated community in Maryland, U.S.

Coordinates: 39°18′58.2″N 76°48′48.8″W

Alberton is an unincorporated community in Howard County, Maryland, United States. A postal office operated in the community from 3 February 1854 to 1 March 1943.

Alberton was the site of a large cotton mill along the Patapsco River, founded by James S. Gary after moving from Connecticut in 1839. A store and seventy company buildings for workers were built on 820 acres around the factory. The mill used adult and child labor, including Gary's son, James Albert Gary. In 1866 and 1868, the mill was damaged by flooding, which Gary survived by floating with his daughter on a log. In 1870, James Albert Gary inherited the mill and the town named after him, "Alberton". In 1885, his son E. Stanley Gary took over the mill, which operated 228 looms and 8,000–9,000 spindles.

In 1879, the stone Victorian Gary Memorial church was built and in 1893, St. Alban's chapel was built as an Episcopal church for the mill town. In 1938, the mill and town was sold to the C.R. Daniels company and renamed Daniels.

== See also ==
- Elysville, Maryland
- Daniels Mill (Daniels, Maryland)
