= Schell, Maryland and West Virginia =

Ghost town in Maryland and West Virginia

Coordinates: 39°20′31″N 79°15′25″W

Schell is an extinct town in Garrett County, Maryland and Mineral County, West Virginia, United States.

== History ==
A post office called Schell was established in 1883 on the West Virginia side, where it remained in operation until it was discontinued in 1931. The community most likely was named after Augustus Schell, a New York politician and lawyer.
