= 1914–15 Arsenal F.C. season =

English football club season

Arsenal
1914–15 season
- Chairman: Henry Norris
- Manager: George Morrell
- Stadium: Highbury
- Second Division: 5th
- FA Cup: 2nd Round
Home colours	Away colours

In the 1914–15 season, the Arsenal F.C. played 38 games, of which it won 19, drew 5 and lost 14. The team finished 5th, but was promoted to the First Division due to the League's expansion to 22 teams. It was the first season since 1893 that the team dropped "Woolwich" from their name, rebranding as Arsenal F.C. They continue to play under this name today.

== Results ==
Arsenal's score comes first

Win	Draw	Loss

=== Football League Second Division ===
Date	Opponent	Venue	Result	Attendance	Scorers
1 September 1914	Glossop	H	3–0		
5 September 1914	Wolverhampton Wanderers	A	1–0		
8 September 1914	Glossop	A	4–0		
12 September 1914	Fulham	H	3–0		
19 September 1914	Stockport County	A	1–1		
26 September 1914	Hull City	H	0–1		
3 October 1914	Leeds City	A	2–2		
10 October 1914	Clapton Orient	H	2–1		
17 October 1914	Blackpool	H	2–1		
24 October 1914	Derby County	A	0–4		
31 October 1914	Lincoln City	H	1–1		
7 November 1914	Birmingham	A	0–3		
14 November 1914	Grimsby Town	H	6–0		
18 November 1914	Nottingham Forest	A	1–1		
21 November 1914	Huddersfield Town	A	0–3		
28 November 1914	Bristol City	H	3–0		
5 December 1914	Bury	A	1–3		
12 December 1914	Preston North End	H	1–2		
25 December 1914	Leicester Fosse	A	4–1		
26 December 1914	Leicester Fosse	H	4–2		
1 January 1915	Barnsley	A	0–1		
2 January 1915	Wolverhampton Wanderers	H	5–1		
16 January 1915	Fulham	A	1–0		
23 January 1915	Stockport County	H	3–1		
6 February 1915	Leeds City	H	2–0		
13 February 1915	Clapton Orient	A	0–1		
20 February 1915	Blackpool	A	4–1		
27 February 1915	Derby County	H	1–2		
6 March 1915	Lincoln City	A	0–1		
13 March 1915	Birmingham	H	1–0		
20 March 1915	Grimsby Town	A	0–1		
27 March 1915	Huddersfield Town	H	0–3		
2 April 1915	Hull City	A	0–1		
3 April 1915	Bristol City	A	1–1		
5 April 1915	Barnsley	H	1–0		
10 April 1915	Bury	H	3–1		
17 April 1915	Preston North End	A	0–3		
24 April 1915	Nottingham Forest	H	7–0		

==== Final League table ====
Pos	Team	Pld	W	D	L	GF	GA	GAv	Pts	Promotion or relegation
3	Barnsley	38	22	3	13	51	51	1.000	47	
4	Wolverhampton Wanderers	38	19	7	12	77	52	1.481	45	
5	Arsenal (P)	38	19	5	14	69	41	1.683	43 (Note: The official Football League records originally showed Birmingham in 5th place and Arsenal in 6th place. In 1975 it was discovered that an error in the calculation of Goal Average had been made and the table was corrected.)	Promotion to the First Division
6	Birmingham	38	17	9	12	62	39	1.590	43	
7	Hull City	38	19	5	14	65	54	1.204	43	

(P) Promoted

=== FA Cup ===
Round	Date	Opponent	Venue	Result	Attendance	Goalscorers
R1	9 January 1915	Merthyr Town	H	3–0		
R2	30 January 1915	Chelsea	A	0–1		
