= Harrison, Mineral County, West Virginia =

Harrison, West Virginia
- Unincorporated community
- Location within West Virginia Location within the United States
- Coordinates: 39°22′38″N 79°12′13″W
- Country: United States
- State: West Virginia
- County: Mineral
- Elevation: 1,680 ft (510 m)
- Time zone: UTC-5 (Eastern (EST))
  - Summer (DST): UTC-4 (EDT)
- Area codes: 304 & 681
- GNIS feature ID: 1554657

Harrison is an unincorporated community in Mineral County, West Virginia, United States. Harrison is located on the Potomac River across from Shallmar, Maryland.

The community was named in honor of Benjamin Harrison (1833–1901), the 23rd President of the United States (1889–1893).
