= Quindocqua United Methodist Church =

Historic church in Maryland, US

- U.S. National Register of Historic Places
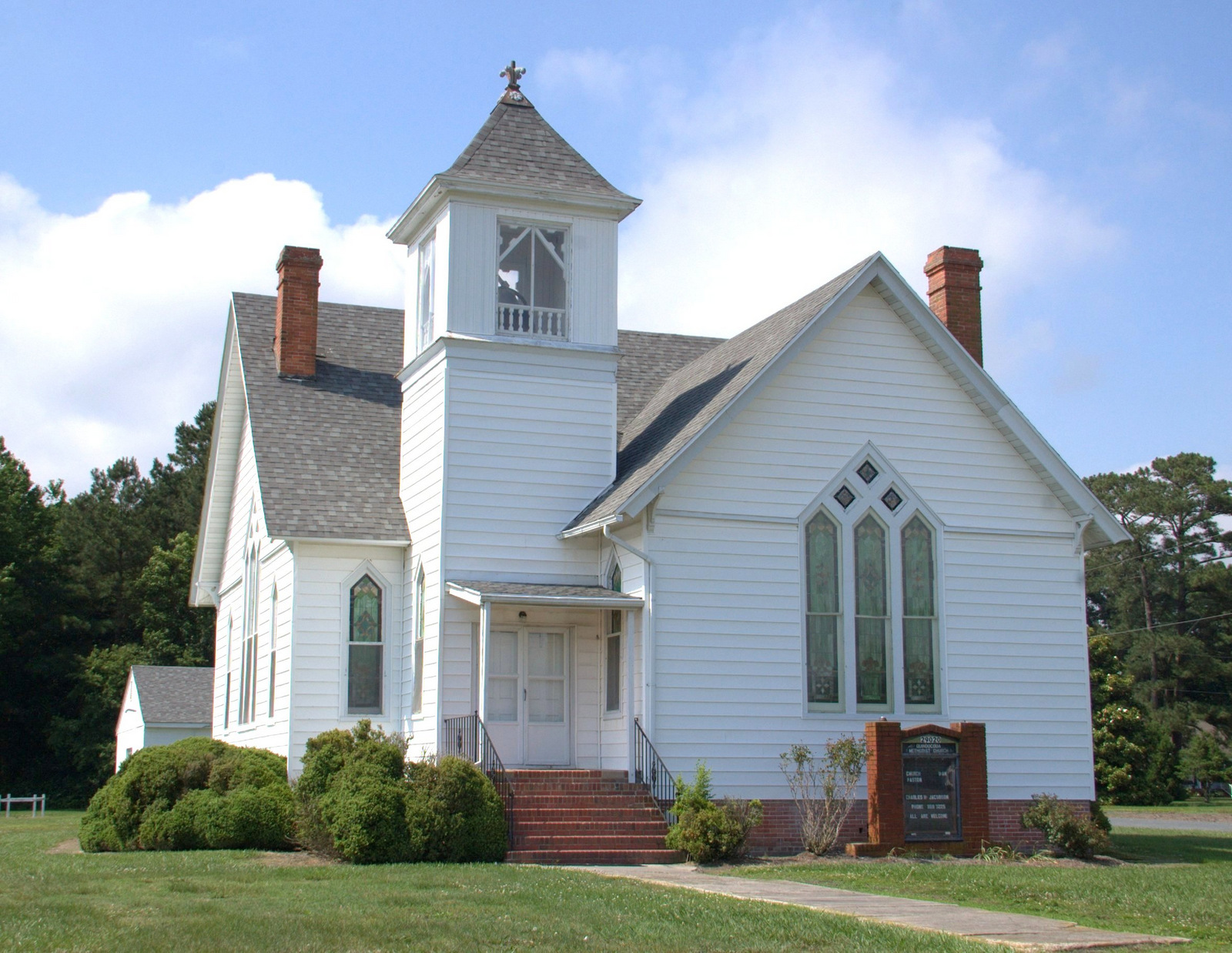

- Location within Maryland Location within the United States
- Location: Quindocqua Road & Whittington Road, Marion, Maryland
- Coordinates: 38°1′2″N 75°44′58″W
- Area: 0.8 acres (0.32 ha)
- Built: 1913
- Architectural style: Late Gothic Revival
- NRHP reference No.: 96000313
- Added to NRHP: March 28, 1996

Quindocqua United Methodist Church is a historic United Methodist church located at Marion, Somerset County, Maryland. It is a single-story, roughly cruciform frame building resting on a raised foundation of common bond brick erected in 1913. It features pointed-arch colored glass windows on three sides, fishscale shingles in the gables, and a three-story bell tower topped by a pyramidal roof. The interior presents a well-preserved example of early-20th-century church design with its ramped floor, semicircular seating, pressed metal ceiling, and period lighting fixtures.

It was listed on the National Register of Historic Places in 1996.
