= Blooming Rose, Maryland =

- Ghost town
- Location within Maryland
- Coordinates: 39.6507°N 79.4533°W
- Country: United States
- State: Maryland
- County: Garrett County
- Established: 1770s-1780s
- Founder: Reverend Jonathan Boucher
- Named for: Surrounding wildflowers
- Elevation: 2,142 ft (653 m)

Blooming Rose is a ghost town in Garrett County, Maryland. The town was named after the large quantity of wildflowers visible when the area was first surveyed.

== History ==
During the American Revolution, the Maryland General Assembly allotted, among other items, 50 acres of land to soldiers and 200 acres of land to officers as payment for their service. All of these plots were located in Garrett County and many would make up the early settlers of Blooming Rose.

In the 1770s and 1780s, settlers moved into the western Maryland land that previously belonged to Lord Baltimore. One of these speculators was Reverend Jonathan Boucher, who named his claim Blooming Rose. Some of the land he claimed already housed a man named Richard Hall, making Hall the first official resident. Little record survives of Hall besides his 1791 death; however, a Private Richard Hall is listed in Maryland land allotments as having received a 50-acre land parcel in Garrett County for Revolution military service.

In 1791, about forty families moved to Blooming Rose. Most of the husbands had been involved in the Northwest Indian War and sought an area with no fighting.

Blooming Rose was never officially abandoned. Instead, it slowly became part of the larger community of nearby Friendsville. It lives on as a sparsely populated hamlet.

== Notable sites ==
Blooming Rose has 11 sites in the Maryland Inventory of Historical Properties. They are:

=== Blooming Rose Church ===
The Blooming Rose Methodist Church is a representative example of the rural, frame, simple Gothic church employed by Protestant denominations in Garrett County. The towers of churches like this are important focal points on the landscape.

=== Old Knights of Pythias Hall ===
The former Knights of Pythias Hall is a 2-story frame building on the west bank of the Youghiogheny River. Now a private residence, the first floor appears to have at one time been some sort of a commercial establishment, as there is a recessed central entrance flanked by large windows. It served as the meeting place for a local chapter of the Knights of Pythias secret society during the late 1800s and early 1900s.

=== Friendsville Commercial Block ===
Now used as private residences, this large frame building was once a commercial block comprising two or three stores. The building is probably two smaller structures joined some years ago. The larger portion of this block has a false front at attic level adding to the appearance of a country town commercial building.

=== Josephine Coffman Fike House ===
Built c.1890, the Josephine Coffman Fike House is situated several feet below Blooming Rose Road, between the road and a small creek. The site consists of the house and several small outbuildings. The house is a two-story, gable-roofed, T-plan house with an asymmetrical three-bay facade. The out buildings include a concrete block, gable-roofed garage and several frame outbuildings. This house is an example of a common western Maryland type. Houses of this general configuration, a rectangular main block and rear kitchen wing, were constructed in Garrett County from the late nineteenth through the early twentieth centuries.

=== William C. Nedrow House ===
Built c.1900, the William C. Nedrow House is situated a few feet from Blooming Rose Road. The house has a vista across the road of a creek valley and hills beyond. The house is a one and half story plank-constructed house with a gable roof. The interior is divided into two rooms. In the northeast corner of the east room is an enclosed corner stair leading to the second floor. There is no cellar. West of the house is a small spring. Northwest of the house is a small frame barn, covered with vertical boards. The house is abandoned and in very poor condition. The barn is in better shape. This house is an example of plank construction popular in western Maryland in the nineteenth and early twentieth centuries.

=== Edgar S. Bartholomew House ===
Built c.1900, The Edgar S. Bartholomew House is situated on a slope several yards north of Blooming Rose Road. several small frame outbuildings are scattered about the property. The property is unoccupied. This house is an example of a common western Maryland type. Houses of this general configuration, a rectangular main block measuring three bays by one bay, were constructed in Garrett County from the late nineteenth through the early twentieth centuries.

=== Milton Frazee House ===
The house was constructed in the late 19th century and bought by Jeff Frazee, an ancestor of owner Milton Frazee, in 1905. This is one of the most elaborately detailed farmhouses in Garrett County. The two-story vertical-plank structure includes a galleried porch, a two-story bay window, decorative exterior trim, and an intricately detailed interior stair built by Fred Fox of Friendsville.

=== Forsythe House ===
Like its neighbor, Milton Frazee House, this is an unusually fancy farmhouse for this area. The roof configuration and elaborate entrance porch are particularly unusual features. A frame bank barn on a stone foundation stands to the northwest. The stone ruins of a spring house lie to the south.

=== Ray Friend House ===
This two-story frame house stands on the side of a gently sloping hill. A vertical-plank garage and a collapesed bank barn are located east of the house. A stone milk house stands to the west. This dwelling is slightly larger and better-finished than the typical Garrett County farmhouse. It is of no known historical significance.

=== Ward O. Sisler House ===
This one-story frame house measures four bays long. The building's northwest facade is covered by a porch. This side's entrance appears in the third bay from the left. A brick stove flue chimney heats the center of the house. It is of no known historical significance.

=== SHA Bridge No. 1104201 ===
The Maryland State Roads Commission developed Bridge Number 1104201 to carry Blooming Rose Road over I-68 in Garrett County. Completed in 1975, the bridge was designed by the Baltimore engineering firm of Ewell, Bomhardt & Associates. The steel for bridge was fabricated by former Cumberland Bridge Co. of Camp Hill, PA, and the bridge was constructed by the former S. J. Groves & Sons Co., Camp Hill, PA. The structure is classified as an inclined leg rigid frame bridge.

== Recreation ==
Blooming Rose is close to Deep Creek Lake, the largest inland body of water in Maryland; it has fishing, boating, and other water-based recreation. It's also near the Wisp Resort, which is a ski resort that operates throughout the year.

== See also ==
- List of ghost towns in Maryland
