= Elysville, Maryland =

Unincorporated community in Maryland, U.S.

Coordinates: 39°19′2″N 76°48′47″W

Elysville is an unincorporated community in Howard County, Maryland, United States. A postal stop operated between February 22, 1834, and February 3, 1854.

== Industry ==
A quarry was constructed on the north side of the Patapsco river in the "Limestone Valley". Joseph Evans and Anne Ellicott settled the site building a small mill in the late 18th century.

The Elysville Manufacturing Company was incorporated in 1829, by Thomas Ely to manufacture cotton textiles. A mill was built on the northern side of the river at Ben's Branch. In 1831, railroad construction of the B&O started through the area. Ely purchased the Evans property on his death in 1833, with a location on Southern shore. The mill was funded by $25,000 in stock sales in July 1845 and erected between August 1845 and the spring of 1846. The mill was owned for a period of time by the Okisko Company, before being acquired by the Alberton Manufacturing Company in 1853. The population was 106 and the mill village was called Alberton at least through the 1870s. The mill changed names to the Sagoman Manufacturing Company, then was then acquired by James S. Gary in 1860, who created still another firm which operated the mill until the 1940s when the C.R. Daniels Company took control.

== Transit ==
In 1853, The Elysville and Canton railroad proposed a rail line through the river valley. In 1877 a stagecoach line was founded with once daily trips to Baltimore for one dollar to compete with rail service charging $1.50.

== See also ==
- Daniels Mill (Daniels, Maryland)
- Elysville bridges
- Bollman Bridge
