= Kempten railway station =

Kempten railway station, or Kempten station, may refer to:

- Kempten (Allgäu) Hauptbahnhof, the main station for the town of Kempten in the German state of Bavaria
- Kempten Ost railway station, another station in the town of Kempten in the German state of Bavaria
- Kempten railway station (Switzerland), serving the village of Kempten in the Swiss canton of Zurich
