= Marion Station, Maryland =

Unincorporated community in Maryland, United States

Marion Station, Maryland Marion
- Unincorporated community
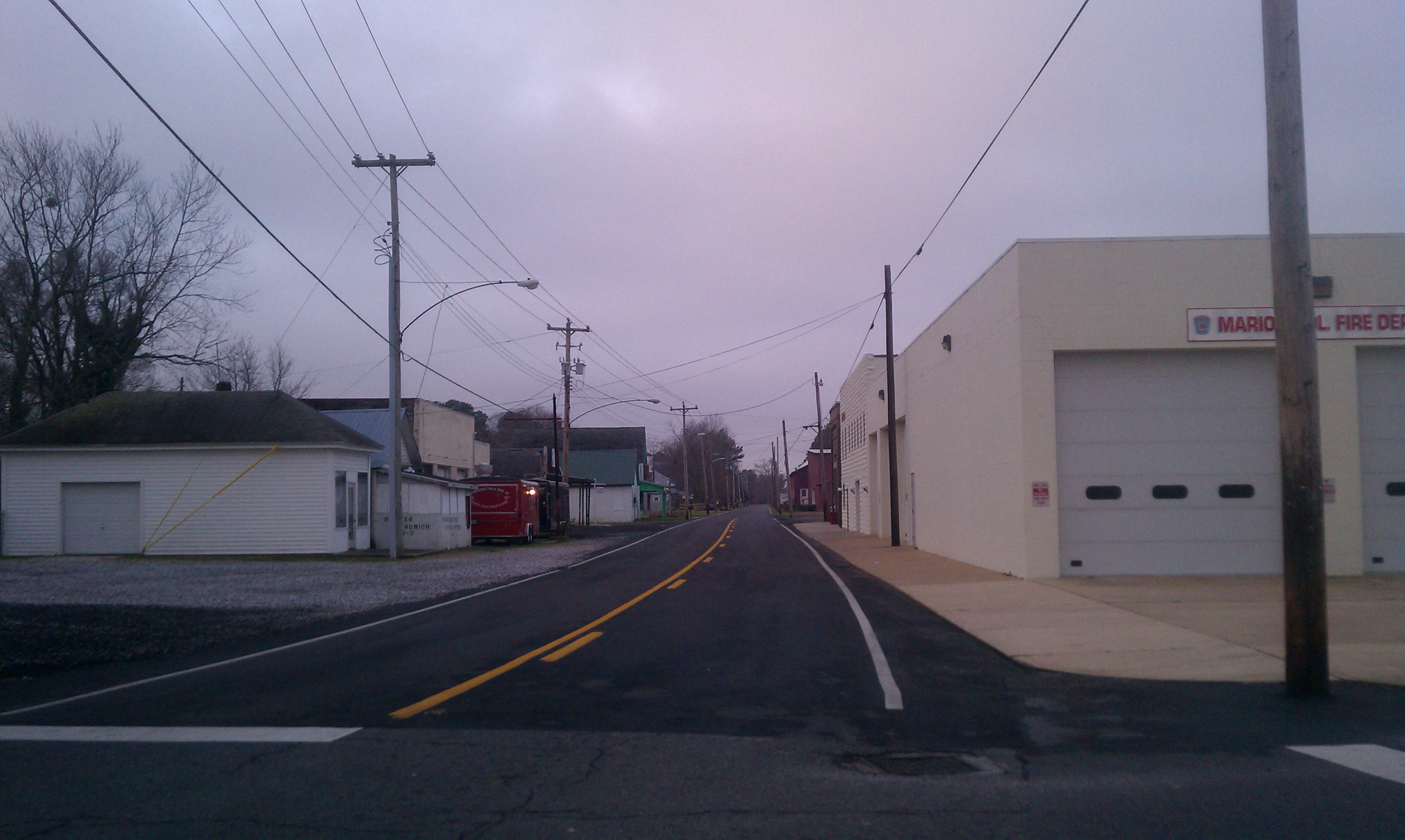
- View looking west on Crisfield-Marion Road

- Location within Maryland Location within the United States
- Coordinates: 38°2′21″N 75°46′15″W
- Country: United States
- State: Maryland
- County: Somerset
- Elevation: 7 ft (2.1 m)
- Time zone: UTC-5 (Eastern (EST))
  - Summer (DST): UTC-4 (EDT)
- ZIP code: 21838
- Area codes: 410 & 443
- GNIS feature ID: 590741

Marion Station, also known as Marion, is an unincorporated community in Somerset County, Maryland, United States. It is located at the northern intersection of Maryland routes 413 and 667. After the arrival of the Pennsylvania Railroad arm known as the "Eastern Shore Railroad" toward Crisfield in 1866, Marion was locally hailed as the "strawberry capital of the world". After the trains stopped coming it went into decline, with some sources even hailing it as a ghost town.

== History ==
Marion Station was once known as Coulbourne Creek until the Pennsylvania Railroad line known as the Crisfield Secondary Branch of the Eastern Shore Railroad reached Crisfield. A train station was built in the town thanks to John C. Horsey, who paid for the right-of-way for the train and the station house. The town was then renamed Marion; the name was taken from Horsey's daughter. Because of the railroad, Marion Station experienced an economic boom, and became the world's leader in strawberry production, utilizing the railroad to ship strawberries across the country. Large trains came to Marion's train station every day to collect strawberries, pulling loaded ice-refrigeration cars out to sell them in large cities. The town saw the construction of several businesses along its Main Street (now Maryland Route 667) corridor: a movie house, grocery store, blacksmith shop, and pharmacy, including a primary school, and several churches. A garage was also built, as was a bar and a volunteer fire department. Marion Station also possessed the first hospital ever built in Somerset County, and the town grew to the point where it needed its own police force.

After several decades, however, the town began to slip into decline. This occurred in the 1950s, when the trains stopped coming to Marion for strawberries. The railroad line was officially abandoned on April 1, 1976 when Conrail was established, and the steel rails were removed from the railroad bed later; however, the railroad was supplanted earlier by the construction of Maryland Route 413's current alignment. Many of the old buildings have been torn down or are now vacant. The train station still stands in the town. In 1997, a revitalization project began to restore the building. It was reopened in the early 2000s as the new Accohannock Indian Museum, containing various relics from the time when Marion Station was a bustling city. The fire department was moved across MD 667 to where it currently stands; the old building is now a flea market. The former pharmacy is located on the short stub of Charles Cannon Road between MD 413 and 667, and has been boarded up for decades. Even the two gas stations located in the town have both closed; the last one closed in the early 2000s.

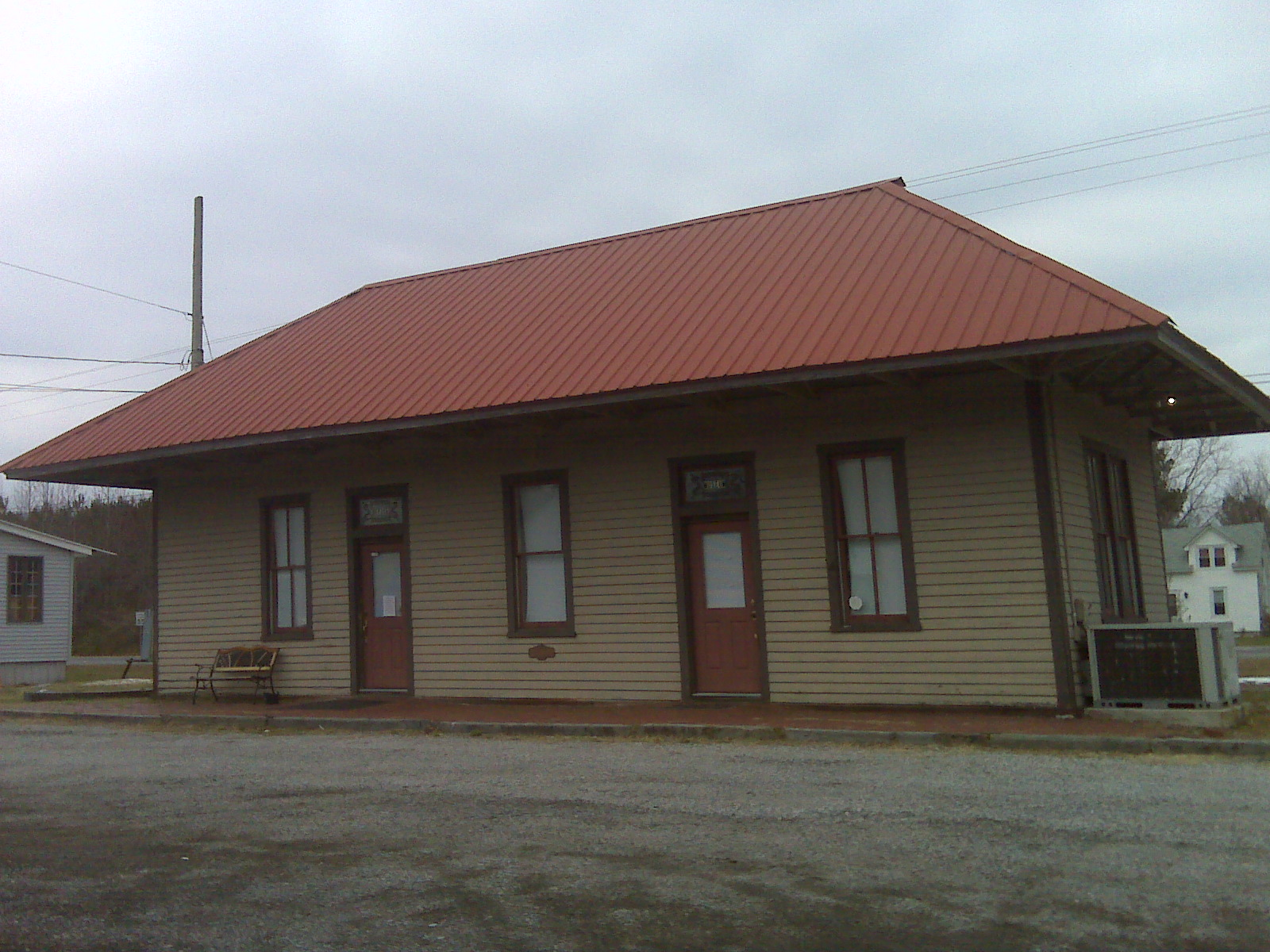
The train station building, which is now the Accohannock Indian Museum.

The lack of trains coming for the strawberries prompted the collapse of Marion's strawberry industry. The fields are now dominated by other food crops, such as soybeans and corn; other fields remain completely vacant, such as the field directly east of the center of the community (between Hudson's Corner Road and Tulls Corner Road). Additionally, Marion Station is home to a very large organic vegetable farm, which was started by sociologists from New Jersey. In the 2000s, housing development began to arise in Marion Station, along the Charles Cannon Road corridor west of the community, making the community a retirement destination.

The Lankford House, Pomfret Plantation, Quindocqua United Methodist Church, Watkins Point Farm, and Williams' Conquest are listed on the National Register of Historic Places.

== Education ==
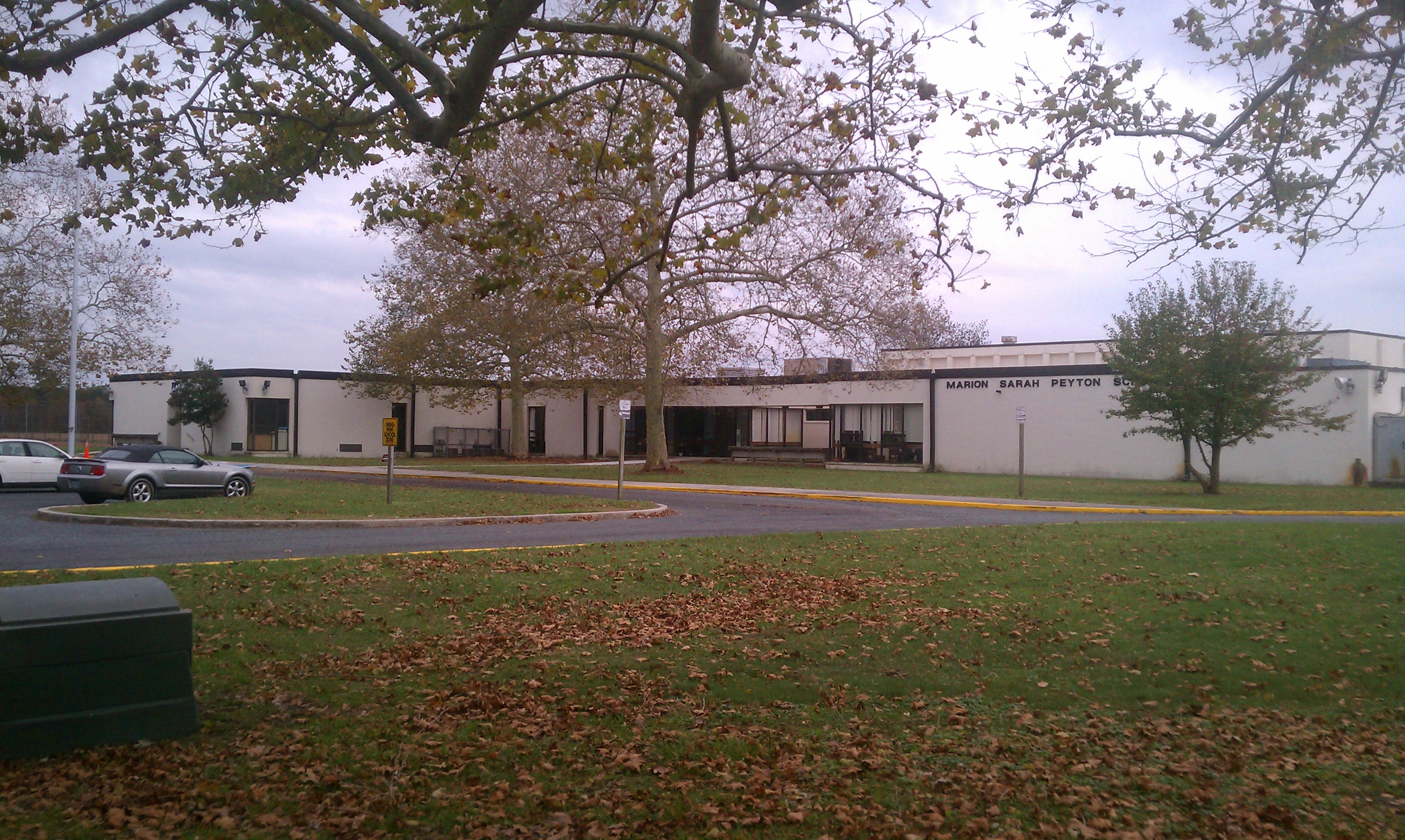
Marion Sarah Peyton School, as of November 2012

The building for Marion Sarah Peyton and Elementary School is located on MD 667: Hudson Corner Road, and once served grades 3–5 for the southern half of Somerset County. After the consolidation of schools which occurred in 2004, however, those grades were moved to Crisfield, and the school closed down. It was reopened in 2007 for adult GED classes. Living Hope Christian School is currently the only school in Marion Station. It is a recently added school opened in 2020 and located on the corner of Hollands Crossing and Crisfield Marion Road.

== Transportation ==
=== Main roads ===
Maryland Route 667 is the main road of the community, housing most of the important facilities in years past and today, such as the volunteer fire department, the train station, the school, and the post office. The road crosses Tulls Corner and Charles Cannon Road; MD 667 is also known as Hudson Corner Road north of and Crisfield–Marion Road south of this intersection. At the turn of the 20th century, Crisfield–Marion Road was known as Main Street. MD 667 also links the town to Pocomoke and U.S. Route 13 southbound to Virginia. The speed limit on the road in town is 30 mph.

Tulls Corner Road leads east out of the town, to the ghost town of Tulls Corner. It passes by a facility for the elderly. Between this facility and Marion, the road was Maryland Route 357 until the early 1990s. Charles Cannon Road is a continuation of Tulls Corner Road after it intersects both MD 413 and MD 667, and eventually leads north to Kingston, also granting access to the boat dock. A small portion of this road, between MD 413 and the subtransmission power line crossing, was also MD 357. Both Tulls Corner Road and Charles Cannon Road largely serve residences in the community.

Also important to the community is Maryland Route 413, the main highway between Crisfield and points north on US 13. It is paralleled closely by MD 667 through the community and carries a speed limit of 55 miles per hour (89 km/h).

=== Navigable rivers ===
The Big Annemessex River passes by the town, with a small local arm known as Coulbourne's Creek. The convergence of these two bodies of water is accessible by Coulbourne Creek Road, off Charles Cannon Road, where a public boat dock is located. The activity in Marion was centered around this area before the economic boom brought about by the Eastern Shore Railroad and the shift to strawberry farming.

=== Public transportation ===
Shore Transit has two routes which serve the community: Route 706 North and Route 706 South. The bus is accessible from two stops within the area: Marion Volunteer Fire Department and the former Marion Sarah Peyton Elementary School, and both operate along the MD 667 corridor within the business area before returning to MD 413.

== See also ==
- Pomfret Plantation
- Williams' Conquest
- WBEY-FM
