= East Vindex, Maryland =

Unincorporated community in Maryland, United States

- Unincorporated community
- Location within Maryland
- Coordinates: 39°25′04″N 79°11′14″W
- Country: United States
- State: Maryland
- County: Garrett
- Elevation: 1,795 ft (547 m)
- Time zone: UTC-5 (Eastern (EST))
  - Summer (DST): UTC-4 (EDT)
- Area codes: 301 & 240
- GNIS feature ID: 590125

East Vindex is an unincorporated community in Garrett County, Maryland, United States. The town is located near the Maryland/West Virginia border. There is also a West Vindex. East Vindex is located 2.1 miles (3.4 km) north of Kitzmiller.
