= West Vindex, Maryland =

Unincorporated community in Maryland, United States

- Unincorporated community
- Location within Maryland
- Coordinates: 39°25′03″N 79°12′20″W
- Country: United States
- State: Maryland
- County: Garrett
- Elevation: 2,329 ft (710 m)
- Time zone: UTC-5 (Eastern (EST))
  - Summer (DST): UTC-4 (EDT)
- Area codes: 301, 240
- GNIS feature ID: 591529

West Vindex is an unincorporated community in Garrett County, Maryland, United States. West Vindex is 2.4 miles (3.9 km) north-northwest of Kitzmiller.
