= Maryland Route 380 =

State highway in Maryland, US

Maryland Route 380
- Maryland Route 380 highlighted in red

Route information
- Maintained by MDSHA
- Length: 1.56 mi (2.51 km)
- Existed: 1934–present

Major junctions
- South end: Ape Hole Road at Lawsonia
- North end: Main Street in Crisfield

Location
- Country: United States
- State: Maryland
- Counties: Somerset

Highway system
- Maryland highway system; Interstate; US; State; Scenic Byways
← MD 378	→ MD 381

Maryland Route 380 (MD 380) is a state highway in the U.S. state of Maryland. The state highway runs 1.56 miles (2.51 km) from Ape Hole Road at Lawsonia north to Main Street at the city limit of Crisfield in southwestern Somerset County. MD 380, which is the southernmost state highway in Maryland, provides access to a suburban area south of Crisfield. The state highway was built in the mid-1930s.

== Route description ==
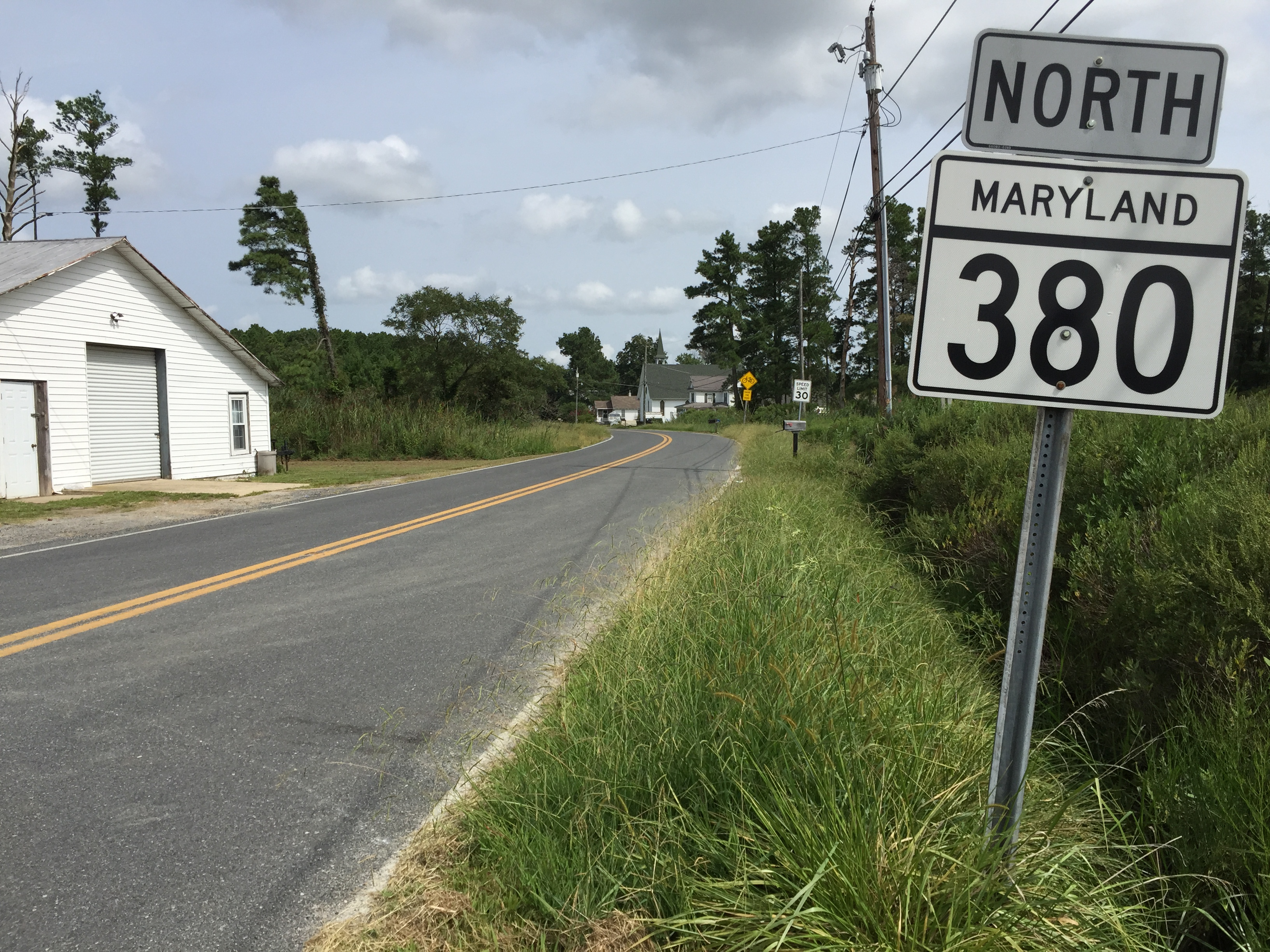
View north at the south end of MD 380 at Ape Hole Road in Lawsonia

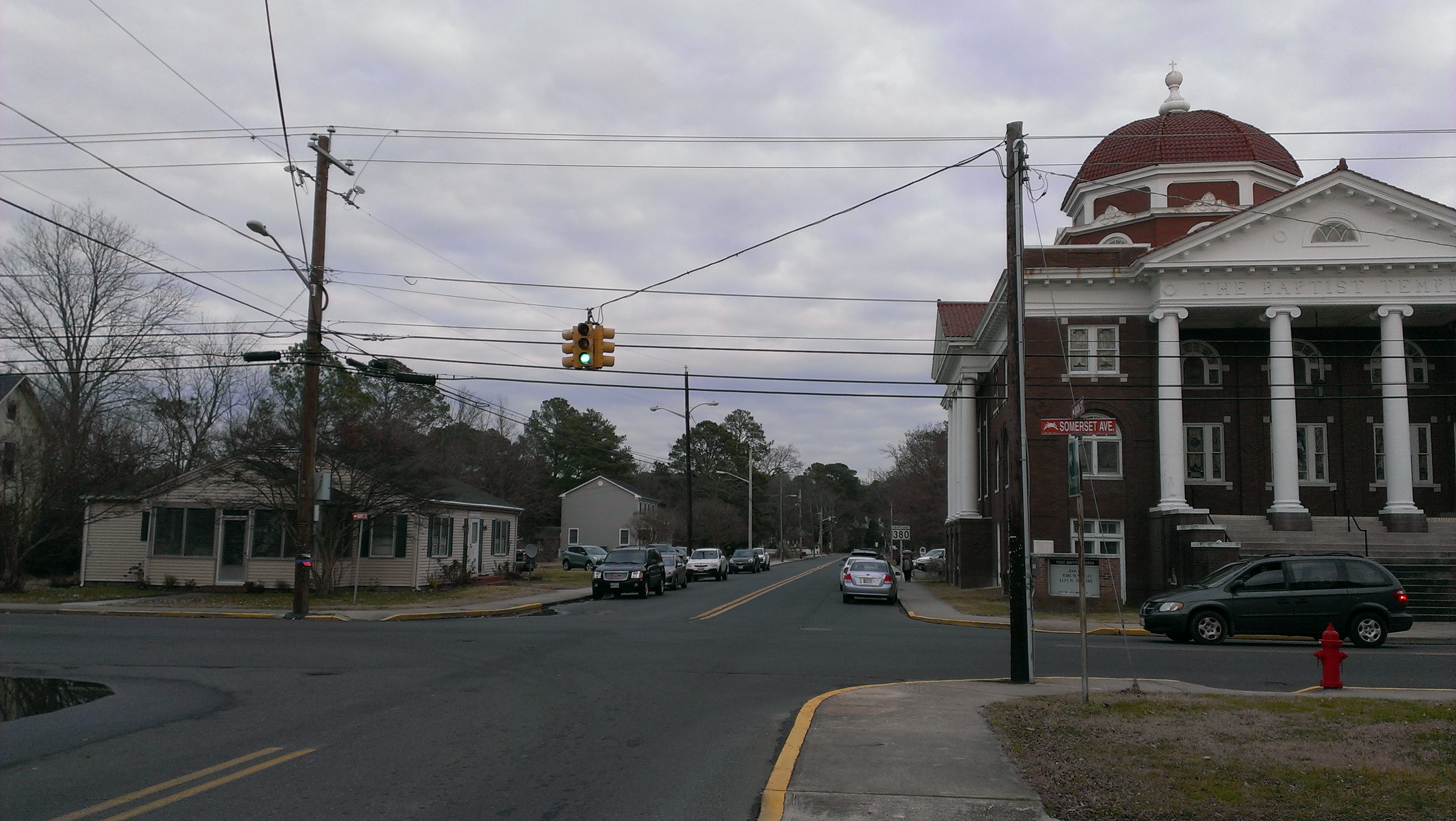
A view of the north end of MD 380 from Main Street, across Somerset Avenue.

MD 380 begins at a three-way intersection with Byrdtown Road, which heads southwest, and Ape Hole Road, which heads southeast toward Ape Hole Creek, an inlet of the Pocomoke Sound. The state highway heads north as two-lane undivided Lawsonia Road through a residential area. MD 380 passes Boone Road and Asbury Road, which were formerly MD 359 and MD 358, respectively, before reaching a four-way intersection with Walter Jones Road, Freedomtown Road, and Main Street Extended. MD 380 turns west onto Main Street Extended. The state highway reaches its northern terminus at the Crisfield city limits adjacent to the Crisfield Armory. Main Street heads west through the Crisfield Historic District, where the street intersects Somerset Avenue and MD 413.

== History ==
MD 380 was constructed east and south from the pre-existing concrete Main Street in Crisfield starting in 1934. The state highway was completed and marked along its present route by 1939. MD 380 extended west to Somerset Avenue, then part of MD 358, in the mid-1950s when the highway was widened, but was removed from the city of Crisfield by 1995.

== Junction list ==
The entire route is in Somerset County.

Location	mi	km	Destinations	Notes
Lawsonia	0.00	0.00	Ape Hole Road east / Byrdtown Road west	Southern terminus
Crisfield	1.56	2.51	Main Street west	Crisfield city limit; northern terminus
1.000 mi = 1.609 km; 1.000 km = 0.621 mi
