= Maryland Route 358 =

State highway in Maryland, United States

Maryland Route 358
- Jacksonville Road
- Maryland Route 358 highlighted in red

Route information
- Maintained by MDSHA and City of Crisfield
- Length: 1.13 mi (1.82 km)
- Existed: 1927–present

Major junctions
- South end: MD 413 in Crisfield
- North end: End of state maintenance near Alfred J. Lawson Road near Crisfield

Location
- Country: United States
- State: Maryland
- Counties: Somerset

Highway system
- Maryland highway system; Interstate; US; State; Scenic Byways
← MD 355	→ MD 359

Maryland Route 358 (MD 358) is a state highway located in Somerset County in the U.S. state of Maryland. Known as Jacksonville Road, the state highway runs 1.13 miles (1.82 km) from MD 413 in Crisfield north to the end of state maintenance near Alfred J. Lawson Road. MD 358 connects Crisfield with Janes Island State Park and Crisfield Municipal Airport. MD 358 was constructed on the south side of Crisfield in the mid-1920s. What is now MD 358 north of MD 413 was originally MD 475, which was built in the early 1930s. MD 358 was extended north through Crisfield in the 1940s, taking over MD 475. The portion of MD 358 south of MD 413 was later returned to the city of Crisfield and Somerset County.

== Route description ==
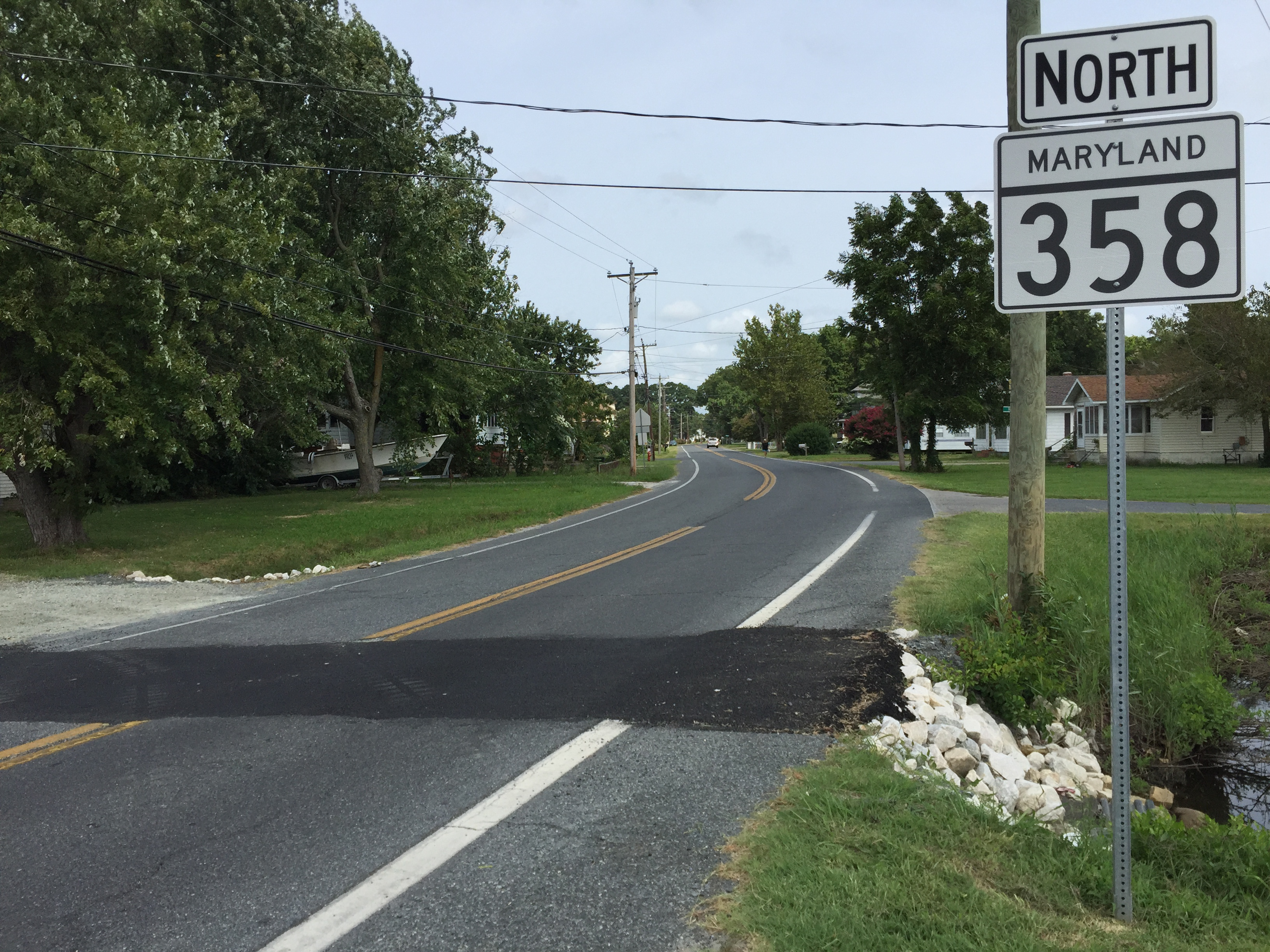
View north along MD 358 at MD 413 in Crisfield

MD 358 begins at an intersection with MD 413 in the city of Crisfield. MD 413 is formed by a one-way pair—Richardson Avenue running northbound and Maryland Avenue running southbound—around a median that once featured the Crisfield Secondary track of the Pennsylvania Railroad. Somerset Avenue, which was once part of MD 358, heads south from the junction as a city street toward Crisfield Academy and High School and the Crisfield Historic District. MD 358 heads north as two-lane undivided Jacksonville Road. The state highway is maintained by the city of Crisfield for 0.09 miles (0.14 km) north to the city limits, where state maintenance begins. MD 358 passes through a residential area that transitions to farmland as the highway approaches Box Iron Road, which is the old alignment of MD 358 and is now unsigned MD 358A. Immediately beyond Box Iron Road, the state highway intersects Alfred J. Lawson Road, which leads to the main entrance to Janes Island State Park, then reaches its northern terminus at the end of state maintenance. Jacksonville Road continues north as a county highway toward Crisfield Municipal Airport.

== History ==
Maryland Route 475
- Location: Crisfield
- Existed: 1933–c. 1946

MD 358 was first constructed in 1925 along Somerset Avenue south from the Crisfield city limits and east along Asbury Road to Lawsonia Road, which later became MD 380. The Asbury Road segment connected Crisfield with Sackertown Road, which was once MD 360. Another section of MD 358 was paved from the Pennsylvania Railroad (now the MD 413 corridor) to its present northern terminus in 1933; this segment was originally designated MD 475. MD 358 was extended north along Somerset Avenue to Chesapeake Avenue (MD 667) by 1939 and to its present northern terminus by 1946, assuming MD 475. The state highway along Somerset Avenue was widened from Main Street to MD 413 around 1954. MD 358 was removed from the state highway system south of MD 413 by 1995. The state highway was relocated at Box Iron Road to eliminate two sharp curves between 1988 and 1999.

== Junction list ==
The entire route is in Crisfield, Somerset County.

mi	km	Destinations	Notes
0.00	0.00	MD 413 (Maryland Avenue/Richardson Avenue) / Somerset Avenue south – Princess Anne	Southern terminus; Somerset Avenue is former MD 358; MD 413 is Richardson Avenue northbound and Maryland Avenue southbound
1.11	1.79	Alfred J. Lawson Road west – Janes Island State Park	
1.13	1.82	Jacksonville Road north – Crisfield Municipal Airport	Northern terminus; end of state maintenance
1.000 mi = 1.609 km; 1.000 km = 0.621 mi

== Auxiliary route ==
MD 358A is the designation for the 0.07-mile (0.11 km) portion of Box Iron Road adjacent to MD 358's southern intersection with its old alignment.
