= Tawes =

Tawes is a surname. It is also applied to some buildings.

== People ==
- J. Millard Tawes, 54th Governor of Maryland in the United States from 1959 to 1967.

== Geography ==
=== Places ===
==== Wales ====
- Tawe Valley, one of the South Wales Valleys.
- River Tawe (Welsh: Afon Tawe) a river in South Wales.
- Tawe Uchaf a community in the Brecknockshire district of Powys, Wales.
- Tawe barrage in Swansea, Wales.

=== Buildings ===
==== United States ====
- Hytche Athletic Center - formerly known as J. Millard Tawes Gym
- Capt. Leonard Tawes House, a historic home located at Crisfield, Maryland.
- J. Millard Tawes Historical Museum, a museum located in Crisfield, Maryland.

==== Wales ====
- Tawes Theatre, also known as the Tawes Fine Arts Building and Tawes Hall, the home of the Department of English at the University of Maryland.
- Parc Tawe, a retail park and leisure area in Swansea, Wales

== Other ==
- Tawe Valley Disturbance, a geological structure in Wales, UK.
- The Java barb, a species of fish
