= Maryland Route 667 =

State highway in Maryland, United States

Maryland Route 667
- Maryland Route 667 highlighted in red

Route information
- Maintained by MDSHA
- Length: 17.61 mi (28.34 km)
- Existed: 1939–present

Major junctions
- West end: Chesapeake Avenue in Crisfield
- MD 413 at Hopewell and Marion Station
- East end: US 13 in West Pocomoke

Location
- Country: United States
- State: Maryland
- Counties: Somerset

Highway system
- Maryland highway system; Interstate; US; State; Scenic Byways
← MD 665	→ MD 668

Maryland Route 667 (MD 667) is a state highway in the U.S. state of Maryland. The highway runs 17.61 miles (28.34 km) from Chesapeake Avenue in Crisfield east to U.S. Route 13 (US 13) in West Pocomoke. MD 667 forms the old alignment of MD 413 from Crisfield to Hudson Corner in southern Somerset County. The highway has a curvaceously course through the villages of Hopewell and Marion Station while MD 413 passes them on a straight course. The portion of MD 667 between Hudson Corner and West Pocomoke serves the community of Rehobeth. This segment, which was built as Maryland Route 406, serves as a shortcut allowing traffic between Crisfield and Pocomoke City to avoid Westover at the junction of MD 413 and US 13. Portions of MD 667 are part of the Beach to Bay Indian Trail.

The Crisfield–Westover highway was constructed in the 1910s and was numbered MD 413 in 1927. The present course of MD 413 was built from Crisfield to Marion Station in the late 1930s and early 1940s; MD 667 was assigned to the old segments of the highway. When modern MD 413 was completed from Marion Station to Westover in 1950, MD 667 was extended from Marion Station east and north to Westover along the old road. MD 406 started as a short segment of modern highway east from Hudson Corner in the late 1920s. That highway was extended east through Rehobeth to US 13 in the mid-1950s. MD 667 was removed from the Hudson Corner–Westover road and extended over the course of MD 406 to US 13 in 1961.

== Route description ==
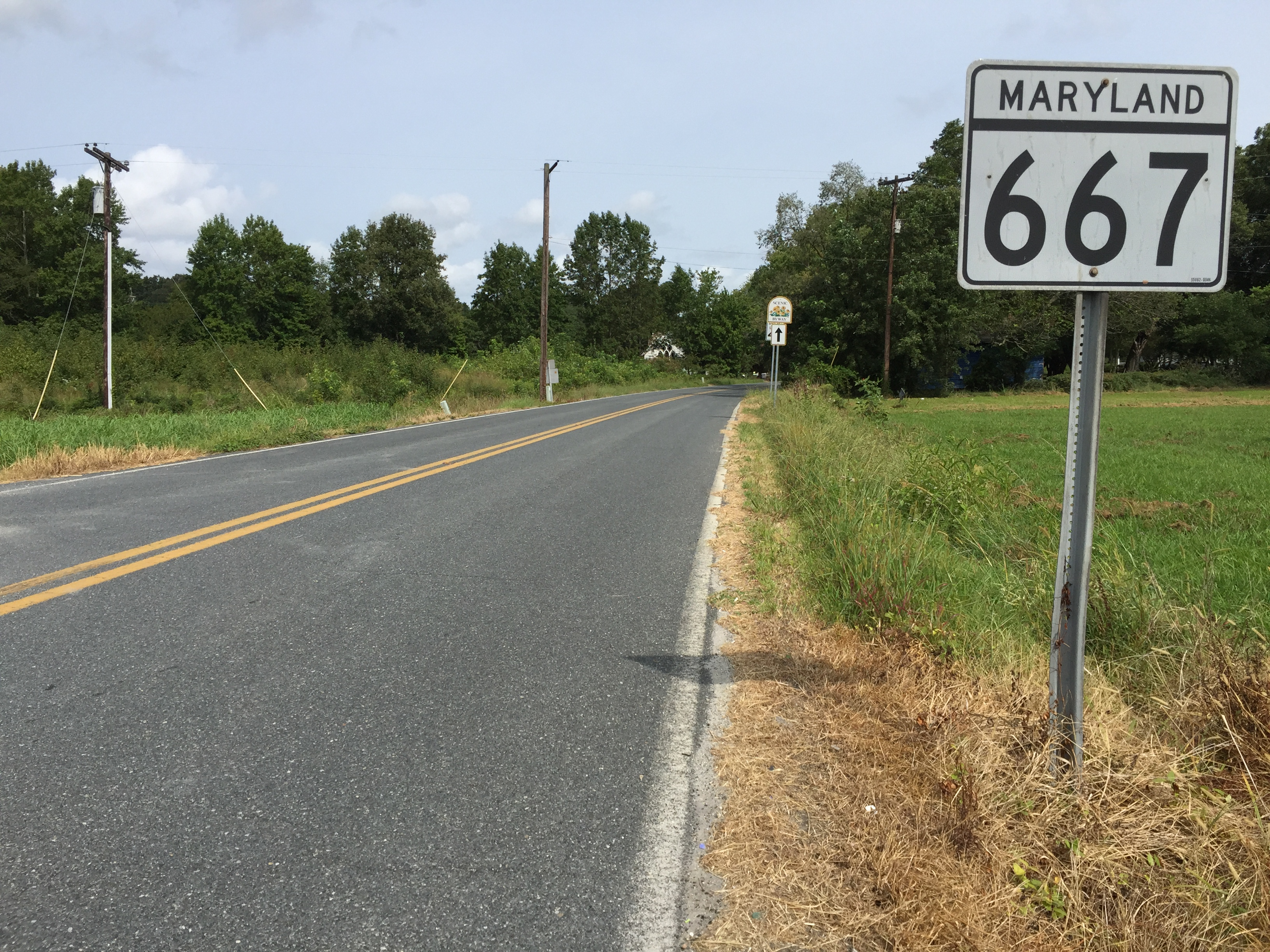
View east along MD 667 at MD 413 in Hopewell

MD 667 begins at the eastern Crisfield city limit. The road continues west as Chesapeake Avenue, which intersects Somerset Avenue on its way toward downtown Crisfield. MD 667 heads east as two-lane undivided Old State Road. The highway curves north, then veers northeast parallel to MD 413 through the village of Hopewell. MD 667 veers north and intersects MD 413 (Crisfield Highway), where its name changes to Crisfield Marion Road. The highway leaves the suburban area surrounding Crisfield and enters a rural area as it continues northeast past St. Peter's Church Road, which leads toward St. Peter's Methodist Episcopal Church and Crisfield Municipal Airport. MD 667 curves east and intersects MD 413 again, then turns northeast and closely parallels the main highway to Marion Station. In the center of the village, the highway intersects Tulls Corner Road and its name changes to Hudson Corner Road.

MD 667 heads east away from MD 413 and crosses East Creek. The highway veers northeast at Burnettsville Road and north as it reaches the hamlet of Hudson Corner. There, the roadway continues straight as Old Westover Marion Road, which passes to the east of Kingston on its way to Westover. MD 667 turns east onto Rehobeth Road, which immediately crosses Marumsco Creek. Old Rehobeth Road splits southeast toward the hamlets of Rehobeth and Shelltown while MD 667 curves northeast in a sweeping curve within which it crosses the Rehobeth Branch of the Pocomoke River. The highway continues between the branch and the main river, then veers east away from the branch. MD 667 veers north and then back east again and crosses Puncheon Landing Branch immediately before the highway reaches its eastern terminus at US 13 (Ocean Highway) near the community of West Pocomoke.

== History ==
Maryland Route 406
- Location: Hudson Corner–West Pocomoke
- Existed: 1930–1961

The Crisfield–Westover road was one of the original state roads marked for improvement by the Maryland State Roads Commission in 1909. The highway was proposed to follow what is today MD 667 from the Crisfield city limits to Marion Station, Charles Cannon Road from Marion Station to west of Kingston, then Kingston Lane through Kingston. East of Kingston and north of Hudson Corner, the proposed highway turned north onto Old Westover Marion Road, which it followed to Westover. The state road then turned right onto Sam Barnes Road and followed what is now US 13 to Old Princess Anne Road. The highway was under construction from Old Princess Anne Road to Kingston Lane by 1911. That segment was completed as a 14-foot-wide (4.3 m) macadam road in 1913. The macadam road was extended southwest to Marion Station in 1915. Another section of the highway was built as a 14-foot-wide (4.3 m) concrete road from the city limits of Crisfield to Hopewell in 1914. The gap between Hopewell and Marion and improvement of Chesapeake Avenue within Crisfield were not completed by 1915; both segments were built as concrete roads by 1921. The Crisfield–Westover highway was designated MD 413 in 1927.

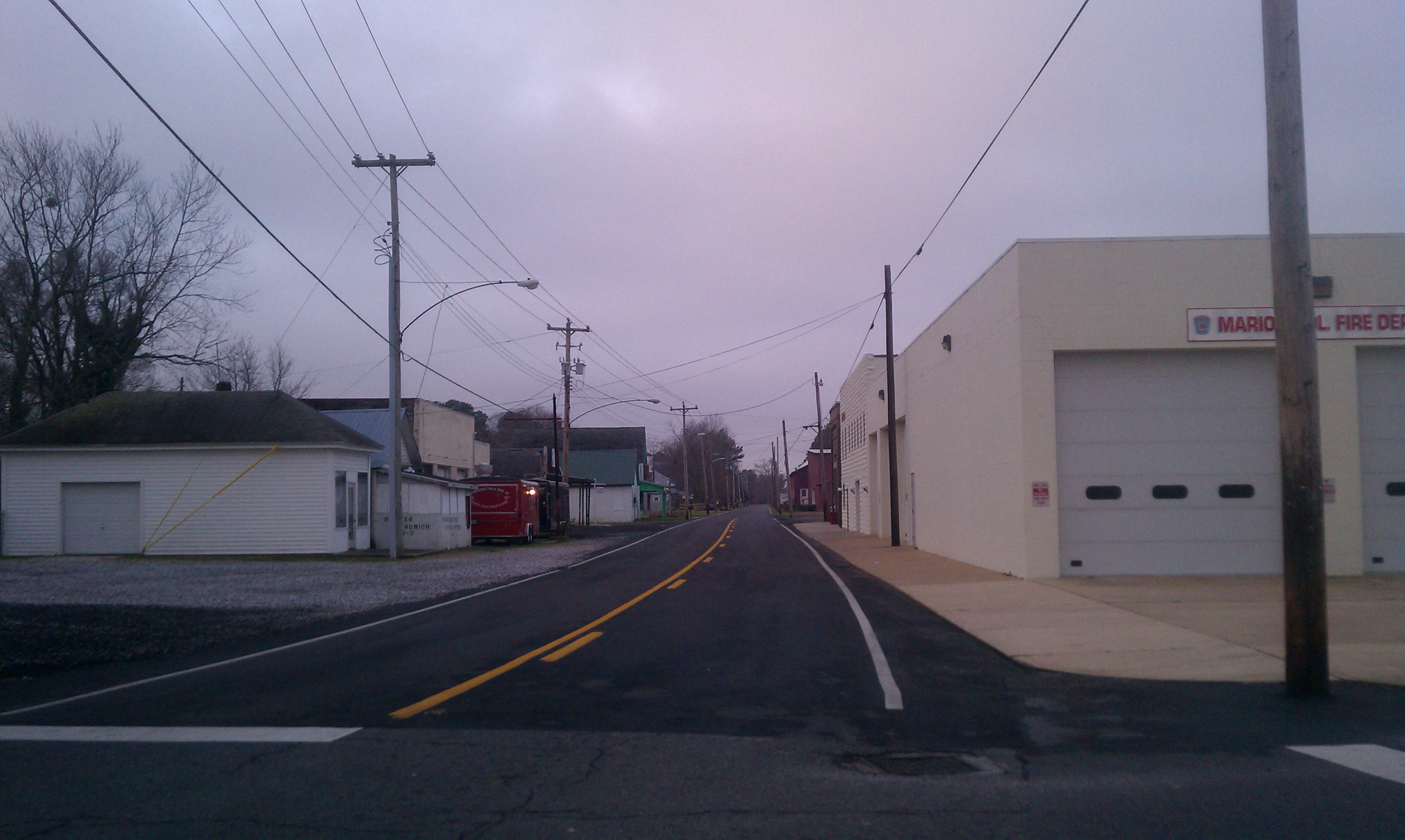
Looking west along MD 667 from Charles Cannon Road in Marion Station

MD 413 was widened to 18 feet (5.5 m) from Crisfield to Marion Station by 1930. The first section of the state highway to be moved to its present course was through Westover; the new highway was built as a concrete road in conjunction with the relocation of US 13 in 1934 and 1935. Sam Barnes Road between the new alignments of MD 413 and US 13 became MD 757 by 1946 and MD 673 in 1950. The next section of new MD 413 was built from the Crisfield city limits at MD 358 to the old road at Hopewell in 1938 and 1939; the old highway was designated MD 667. MD 667 was extended to Marion Station when new MD 413 was extended there in 1942. The remainder of modern MD 413 was constructed from Marion Station to Westover in 1949 and 1950; MD 667 was extended to Westover along the old road. The first segment of MD 406 was constructed as a concrete road from MD 413 at Hudson Corner east to Corntrack Road in 1929 and 1930. The original segment of MD 406 and the remainder of Rehobeth Road were relocated to the modern alignment, paved, and widened to 20 feet (6.1 m) in 1953 and 1954. MD 667 north of Hudson Corner was transferred to county maintenance and the route assumed all of MD 406 from Hudson Corner to US 13 in 1961. The western terminus of MD 667 was rolled back to the Crisfield city limit by 1995.

== Junction list ==
The entire route is in Somerset County.

Location	mi	km	Destinations	Notes
Crisfield	0.00	0.00	Chesapeake Avenue west	Crisfield city limit; western terminius
Hopewell	2.77	4.46	MD 413 (Crisfield Highway) – Crisfield, Princess Anne	
Marion Station	5.81	9.35	MD 413 (Crisfield Highway) – Crisfield, Princess Anne	
Hudson Corner	10.39	16.72	Old Westover Marion Road north – Westover	MD 667 turns east onto Rehobeth Road
West Pocomoke	17.61	28.34	US 13 (Ocean Highway) – Pocomoke, Princess Anne	Eastern terminus
1.000 mi = 1.609 km; 1.000 km = 0.621 mi
