= WBYC-LP =

- Crisfield, Maryland; United States
- Broadcast area: Crisfield, Maryland; Hopewell, Maryland
- Frequency: 107.3 MHz
- Branding: 107.3 WBYC

Programming
- Format: Variety

Ownership
- Owner: The Somerset County Arts Council

History
- First air date: March 19, 2016
- Call sign meaning: "By C" for "by sea"

Technical information
- Licensing authority: FCC
- Facility ID: 191707
- ERP: 48.2 watts
- HAAT: 42.9 meters (141 ft)
- Transmitter coordinates: 37°58′46.47″N 75°51′30.46″W

Links
- Public license information: LMS
- Website: www.wbycradio.com

WBYC-LP is a Variety formatted broadcast radio station licensed to Crisfield, Maryland, serving Crisfield and Hopewell in Maryland. WBYC-LP is owned and operated by The Somerset County Arts Council.
