= Cullen Homestead Historic District =

Historic district in Maryland, United States

- U.S. National Register of Historic Places
- U.S. Historic district
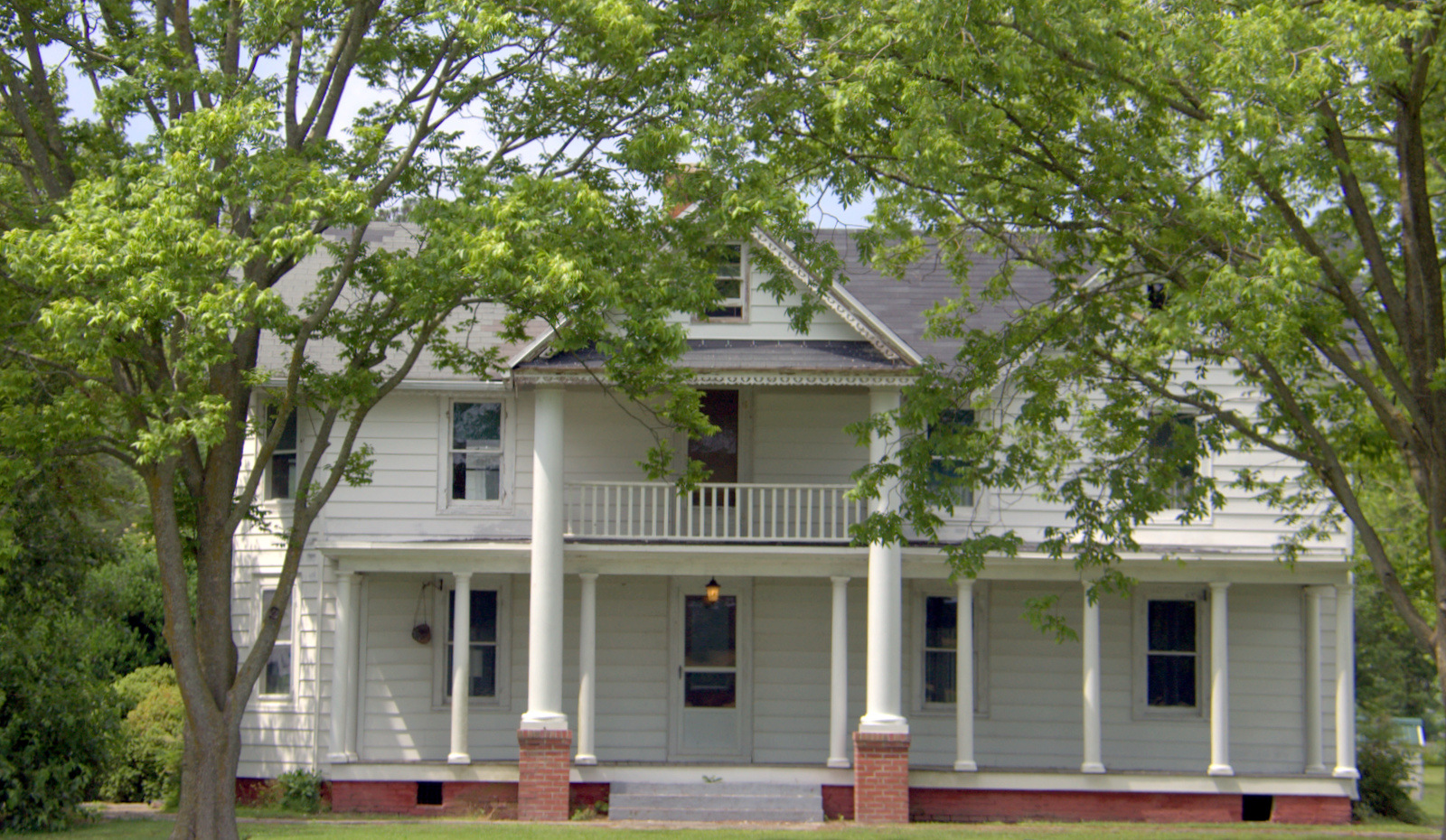

- Location within Maryland Location within the United States
- Location: 4533, 27049, 27067 Lawson Barnes Road, Crisfield, Maryland
- Coordinates: 38°0′27″N 75°49′5″W
- Area: 4.2 acres (1.7 ha)
- Architectural style: Federal, Late Victorian
- NRHP reference No.: 09000932
- Added to NRHP: November 18, 2009

The Cullen Homestead Historic District encompasses a cluster of properties associated with the Cullen family in rural Somerset County, Maryland, United States. Located in the center of Hopewell, just northeast of Crisfield, the district has three main features. The first is, known as the Cullen Homestead, is a c. 1820 Federal style wood frame dwelling. The building has retained much of its interior period woodwork, despite being added to and altered over the years, and has retained its original board sheathing under modern aluminum siding. The second house in the district is a later 19th century house built by Jacob Hoke Cullen in 1880. The oldest part of the house is a T-shaped portion, which was roughly mirrored by a later addition around 1910, giving the house its present H shape. This house has also retained interior and some exterior finish work. The third element of the district is the family cemetery.

The district was listed on the National Register of Historic Places in 2009.

== See also ==
- National Register of Historic Places listings in Somerset County, Maryland
