= Hudson Corner, Maryland =

Unincorporated community in Maryland, United States

- Unincorporated community
- Location within Maryland
- Coordinates: 38°03′11″N 75°42′31″W
- Country: United States
- State: Maryland
- County: Somerset
- Elevation: 3 ft (0.91 m)
- Time zone: UTC-5 (Eastern (EST))
  - Summer (DST): UTC-4 (EDT)
- ZIP code: 21838
- Area codes: 410, 443, and 667
- GNIS feature ID: 588675

Hudson Corner is an unincorporated community in Somerset County, Maryland, United States. Hudson Corner is located at the intersection of Maryland Route 667 and Old Westover Marion Road, northeast of Marion Station.
