= Somers Cove Marina =

Marina in Somerset County, Maryland, US

Coordinates: 37°58′37″N 75°51′22″W

Somers Cove Marina is a marina owned by the state of Maryland and governed by a seven-member Commission. It is located in Crisfield, Somerset County. 37°58.6 N, 75°51.9 W

The perfect marina for boating, sailing and fishing on the Chesapeake Bay and the Tangier and Pocomoke Sounds. Home to charter boats, head boats, bait & tackle, and stainless steel fish-cleaning stations. This 515 slip marina offers access to many of Somerset County's finest attractions.
