= Make Peace =

Historic house in Maryland, United States

- U.S. National Register of Historic Places
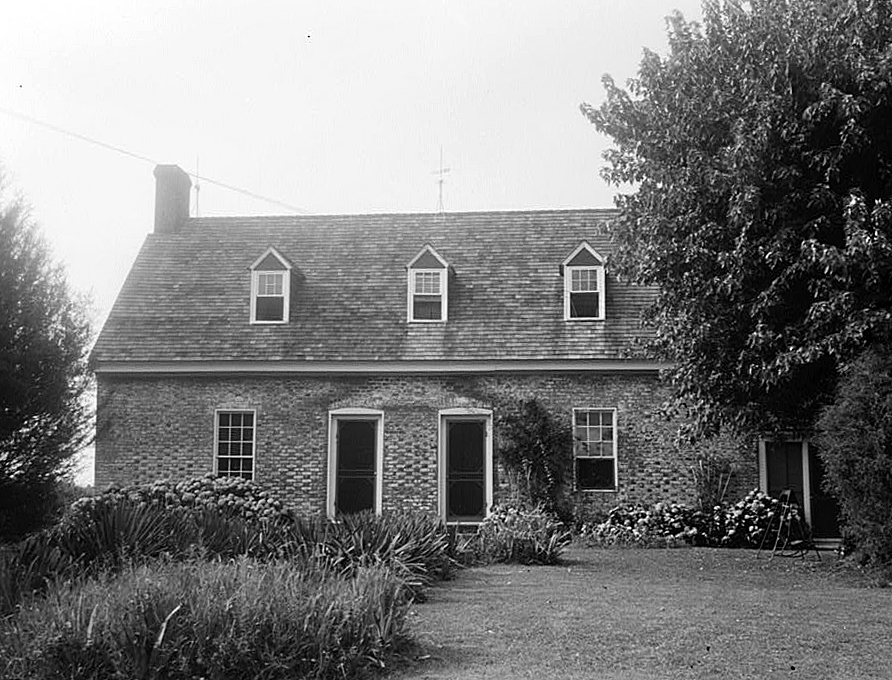

- Location within Maryland Location within the United States
- Location: Johnson Creek Road, Crisfield, Maryland
- Coordinates: 37°58′25″N 75°49′13″W
- Area: 10 acres (4.0 ha)
- Built: 1725
- NRHP reference No.: 75000917
- Added to NRHP: November 20, 1975

Make Peace (or Makepeace) is a historic home located at Crisfield, Somerset County, Maryland, United States.

It is a 1 1/2-story Flemish bond brick house of the early 18th century.

Make Peace was listed on the National Register of Historic Places in 1975.
