= Maryland Route 413 =

State highway in Somerset County in Maryland, USA

Maryland Route 413
- Maryland Route 413 highlighted in red

Route information
- Maintained by MDSHA
- Length: 14.61 mi (23.51 km)
- Existed: 1927–present
- Tourist routes: Chesapeake Country Scenic Byway

Major junctions
- South end: Dead end in Crisfield
- MD 460 in Crisfield; MD 358 in Crisfield; MD 667 in Hopewell; MD 667 in Marion Station; MD 361 in Westover
- North end: US 13 near Westover

Location
- Country: United States
- State: Maryland
- Counties: Somerset

Highway system
- Maryland highway system; Interstate; US; State; Scenic Byways
← MD 410	→ MD 414

Maryland Route 413 (also known as MD 413 or Route 413) is a 14.61-mile (23.51 km) state highway in Somerset County in the U.S. state of Maryland. The route runs from a dead end at Crisfield's city dock, which is located on the Tangier Sound, northeast to U.S. Route 13 (US 13) in Westover. It is the main highway leading into Crisfield, and is known as Crisfield Highway for much of its length. The highway travels through mostly rural areas of farms and woods as well as the communities of Hopewell, Marion Station, and Kingston. It is a two-lane undivided road for most of its length; a portion of the road in Crisfield is a four-lane road that follows a one-way pair. MD 413 is part of two scenic routes: Chesapeake Country Scenic Byway and the Beach to Bay Indian Trail; both are Maryland Scenic Byways.

The Crisfield–Westover Road was one of the original state roads marked for improvement by the Maryland State Roads Commission. The highway was paved in the 1910s and designated MD 413 in 1927. MD 413 was relocated starting in the late 1930s to a new alignment parallel to the Eastern Shore Railroad line that made Crisfield the "Seafood Capital of the World." The relocation began in Crisfield and was completed to Westover in 1950. The old alignment of MD 413 was designated MD 667. The state highway was expanded to a divided highway in the mid-1950s in Crisfield. The railroad track was abandoned in 1976 and later removed, and the right-of-way began conversion into a rail-trail in 2019.

== Route description ==
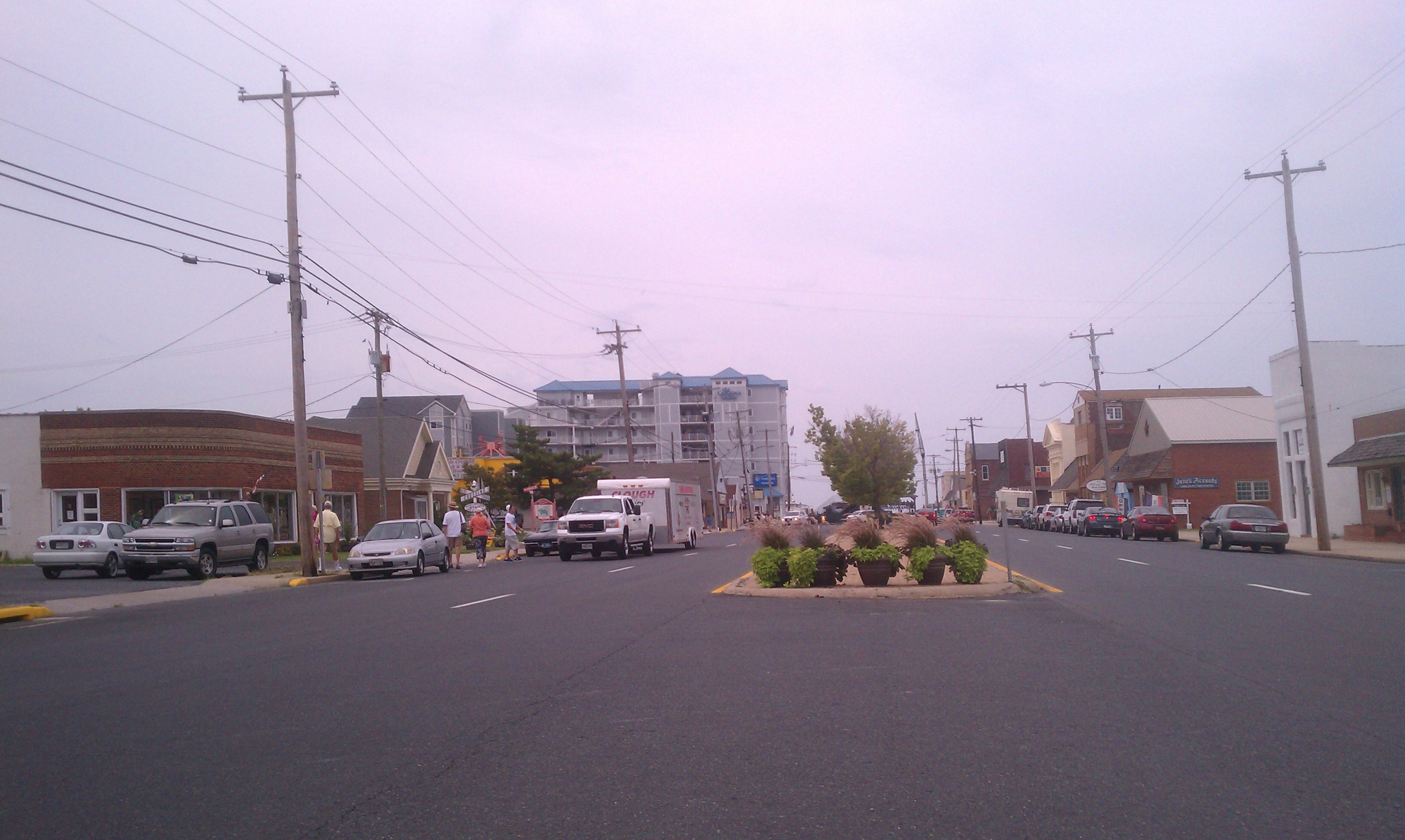
West Main Street (MD 413) in downtown Crisfield

MD 413 begins at the city dock on the waterfront in Crisfield at the intersection with Dock Street, heading to the northeast. It begins on a four-lane divided boulevard, and is known as West Main Street, fronting local businesses in the downtown area. After Seventh Street, Main Street leaves MD 413, and the boulevard's two carriageways become known as Richardson Avenue northbound and Maryland Avenue southbound. At this point the road begins to front mostly homes on Maryland Avenue, while on Richardson Avenue it runs past and homes and businesses, such as gas stations and restaurants. On a gentle curve, Chesapeake Avenue intersects the northbound carriageway, providing access to the southern beginning of MD 667.

Before leaving the city, the route intersects MD 460, also known as Hall Highway, immediately accessible only from the southbound carriageway. MD 460 provides a direct link to McCready Memorial Hospital. Access to that route from northbound MD 413 is given by Wynfall Avenue, which the road intersects farther south. Very soon after, it intersects MD 358 (Jacksonville Road), which heads north, and Somerset Avenue, which heads south. Past the MD 358 intersection, the road narrows to two travel lanes with the median becoming a center left-turn lane as many businesses and side streets front the road. The route becomes the Crisfield Highway, which it is known as for the remainder of its journey. After intersecting Silver Lane, the left turn lane ends, and MD 413 becomes a rural, two-lane undivided highway with full shoulders, exiting Crisfield's corporate limits just north of the Sherwin–Williams (former Rubberset) entrance and continuing past the old site of Carvel Hall Cutlery.

Upon leaving Crisfield, MD 413 passes through a mix of woodland and farmland. In Hopewell, MD 667 intersects the highway, and after clearing some modest wooded development up to and slightly beyond the Holland Crossing Road intersection, the route enters heavy woodland. It passes a man-made pond before intersecting MD 667 again. Both routes parallel each other on the way into the community of Marion Station, straddling the old railroad bed. Both routes are intersected by Davis Road and Tulls Corner Road/Charles Cannon Road, after which MD 667 turns almost due east, with MD 413 heading through a small neighborhood outside the center of Marion.

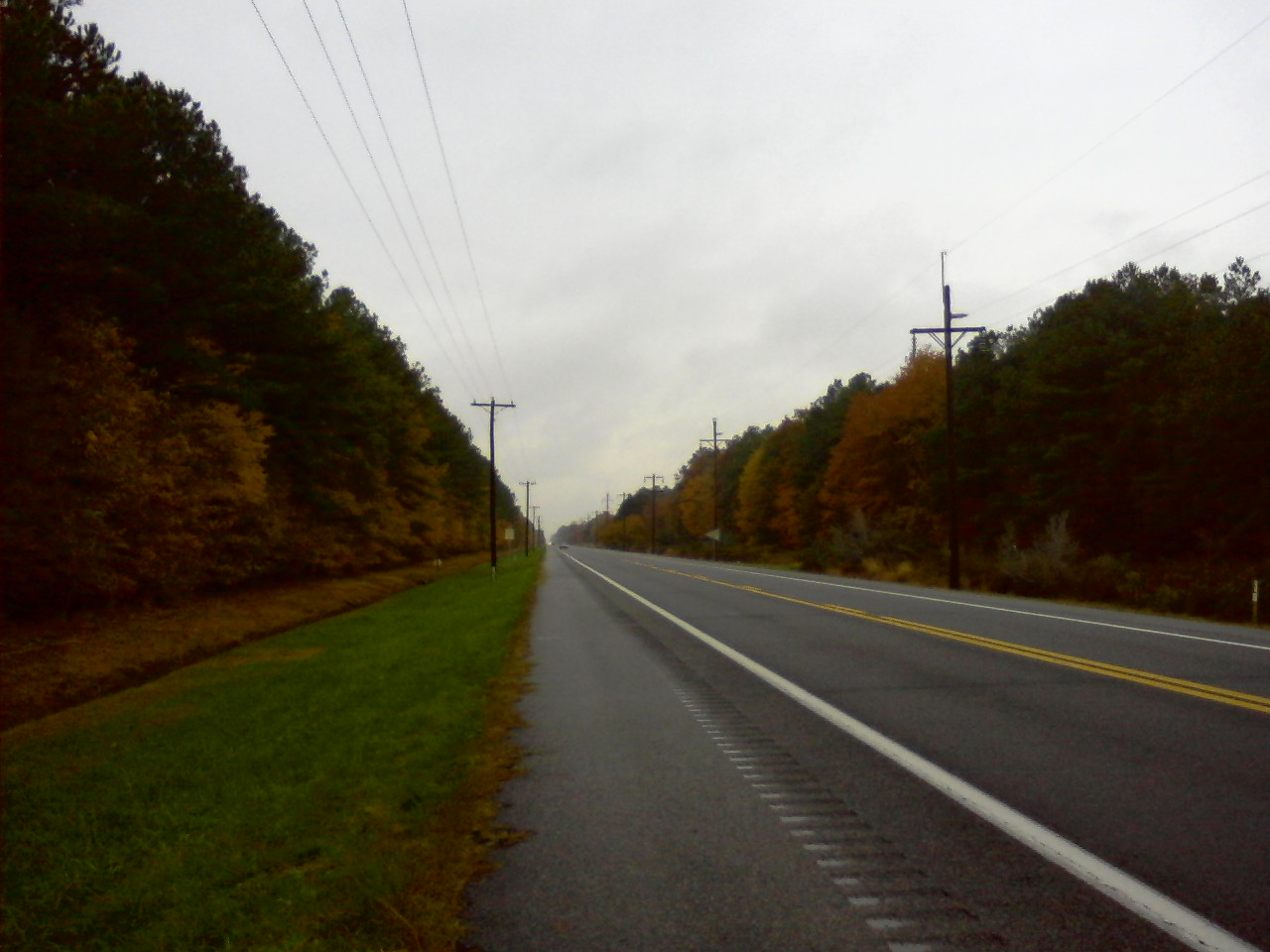
A view of the route south of Lovers Lane, in autumn.

Past Marion, the route resumes northeast through woods and farms with some residences along the route. Approaching Kingston, MD 413 intersects Lovers Lane. After this, a long curve to the north-northeast begins, which ends just south of Kingston Lane and the center of Kingston. Beyond Kingston, the route crosses the Big Annemessex River and travels past a tree farm. After passing through a forest, two side roads lead to the Somerset County Health Department and the Somerset Intermediate School, with the pavement's striping reconfigured to accommodate left turns at the two close intersections.

As the road nears Westover, it passes by the Great Hope Golf Course and shortly after intersects MD 361 (Fairmount Road). Here, the road meets Old Westover-Marion Road, a former routing of the highway. Passing through the development of Westover, MD 413 intersects the western terminus of MD 673 (Sam Barnes Road), a short connector route to US 13 southbound to Pocomoke City. From US 13 northbound, MD 673 serves as the connection to MD 413 southbound. Past MD 673, the highway passes through farmland. MD 413 heads through some woods and crosses the Back Creek of the Manokin River before coming to end at an intersection with US 13.

MD 413 is part of the Chesapeake Country Scenic Byway, which consists of various roads near the Chesapeake Bay on the Eastern Shore of Maryland. It is also part of the Beach to Bay Indian Trail, a Maryland Scenic Byway that connects Ocean City on the Atlantic Ocean to Smith Island in the Chesapeake Bay and is noted by signs along the route.

== History ==
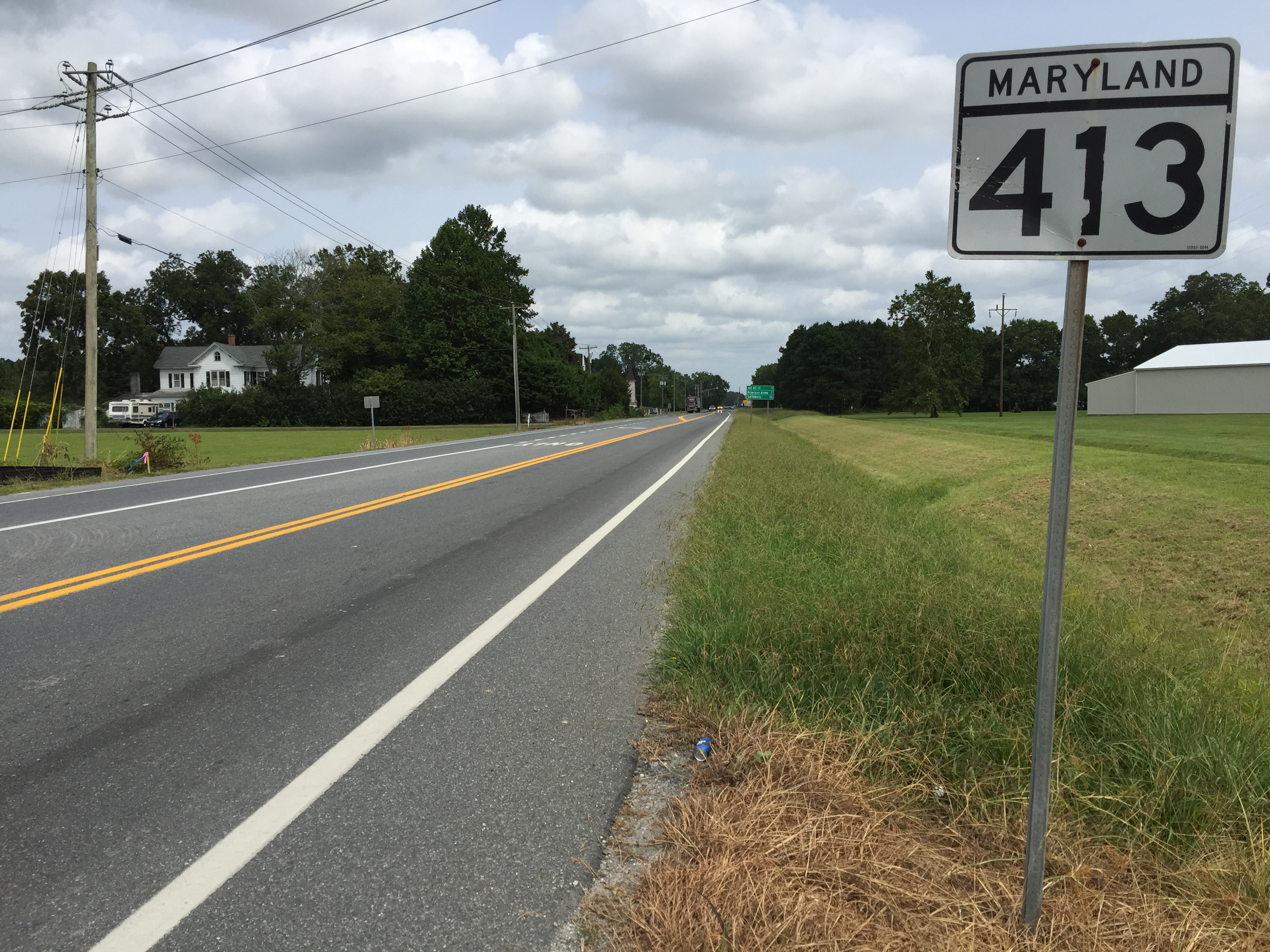
View north along MD 413 at MD 361 in Westover

Crisfield grew to prominence as the "Seafood Capital of the World" and became the second largest city in Maryland by 1904 thanks to an extension of the Eastern Shore Railroad to the city in 1866 instigated by the city's namesake, John W. Crisfield. The city's importance led to the Crisfield–Westover Road being designated one of the original state roads nominated for improvement by the Maryland State Roads Commission in 1909. The state road was paved from the eastern city limits of Crisfield (the present western terminus of MD 667) to Hopewell and from Westover to Kingston in 1913. The segment between Kingston and Marion was completed in 1915. The state road was completed when the final section was completed between Hopewell and Marion by 1920. MD 413 received its number in the original assignment of state route numbers in 1927. Within the city of Crisfield, Maryland Avenue was constructed between Main Street and Somerset Avenue, Chesapeake Avenue was brought into the state highway system within the city limits, and Main Street was improved and brought into the state highway system between the city pier and Maryland Avenue around 1935.

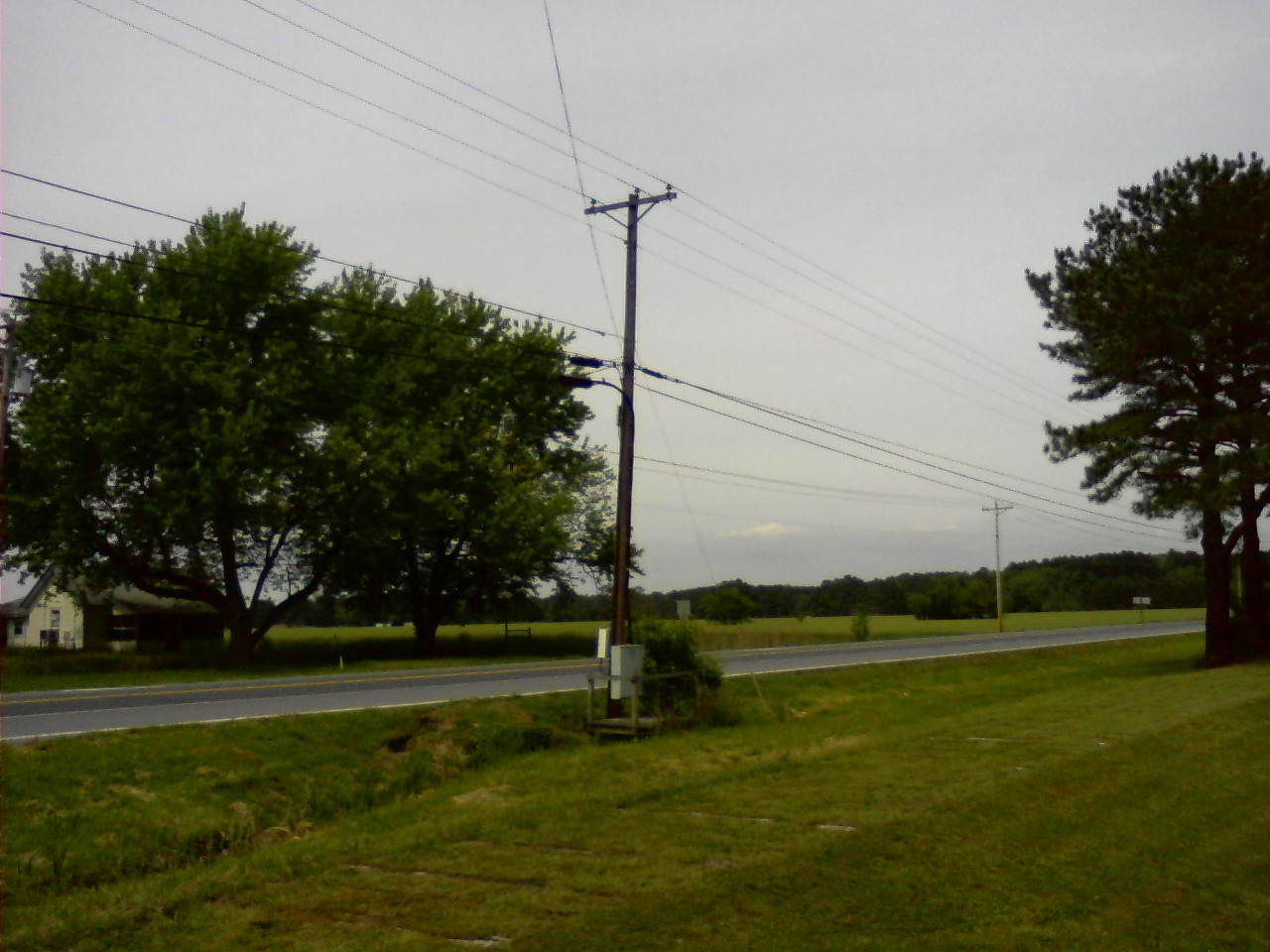
View of MD 413 in Marion Station, with the railroad bed visible just to the east of it

Starting in the mid-1930s, MD 413 was relocated to an alignment paralleling the Crisfield Secondary Branch of the Pennsylvania Railroad. The first portion of MD 413 was relocated in 1935 in conjunction with the relocation of US 13 between Princess Anne and Westover. MD 413 was moved from Sam Barnes Road and Sign Post Road to its present alignment between US 13 and Old Westover–Marion Road in Westover. The first section of the present straight highway between Crisfield and Westover was constructed in 1938 and 1939 from the eastern city limits of Crisfield (near the intersection with MD 358) to Hopewell. The bypassed portion of MD 413 and subsequent bypassed segments were designated MD 667. The section of the new alignment between Hopewell and Marion was completed in 1942. The Marion–Westover portion of the realignment was completed in 1950.

MD 413 was expanded to a four-lane divided highway between the city pier and the eastern city limits of Crisfield in 1956. Between the city pier and Maryland Avenue, the divided highway replaced the path of the railroad; the railroad's terminus was moved to a new pier to the north. North of the Main Street portion of the divided highway, the railroad track separated the two directions of MD 413: Maryland Avenue formed the southbound lanes while Richardson Avenue was brought into the state highway system to comprise the northbound lanes. The two directions of MD 413 were divided by an operating railroad track until the Crisfield Secondary Branch was abandoned with the formation of Conrail in 1976. The railroad has since been removed and replaced with a landscaped median in Crisfield; the railroad bed north of the city laid unused and largely overgrown until 2019, when a new multi-use trail was built upon it. The first section of the trail, from Crisfield to Marion Station, was officially opened on July 9, 2021 and named the Terrapin Run Trail.

== Junction list ==
The entire route is in Somerset County.

Location	mi	km	Destinations	Notes
Crisfield	0.00	0.00	Dead end at city docks	Southern terminus of MD 413
Crisfield	1.33	2.14	MD 460 west (Hall Highway)	Eastern terminus of MD 460; access to and from southbound lane; access to McCready Memorial Hospital
Crisfield	1.40	2.25	MD 358 north (Jacksonville Road) / Somerset Avenue – Janes Island State Park	Southern terminus of MD 358
Hopewell	3.45	5.55	MD 667 (Crisfield-Marion Road/Old State Road)	
Marion Station	5.95	9.58	MD 667 (Crisfield-Marion Road) to US 13 south – Pocomoke, Marion	
Westover	13.34	21.47	MD 361 west (Fairmount Road) – Fairmount, Frenchtown, Rumbly	Eastern terminus of MD 361
Westover	14.06	22.63	MD 673 east (Sam Barnes Road) to US 13 south – Pocomoke	Western terminus of MD 673
Westover	14.61	23.51	US 13 (Ocean Highway) – Salisbury, Pocomoke	Northern terminus of MD 413; no access from northbound US 13 to MD 413
1.000 mi = 1.609 km; 1.000 km = 0.621 mi: Incomplete access
