= Crisfield, Maryland =

- City
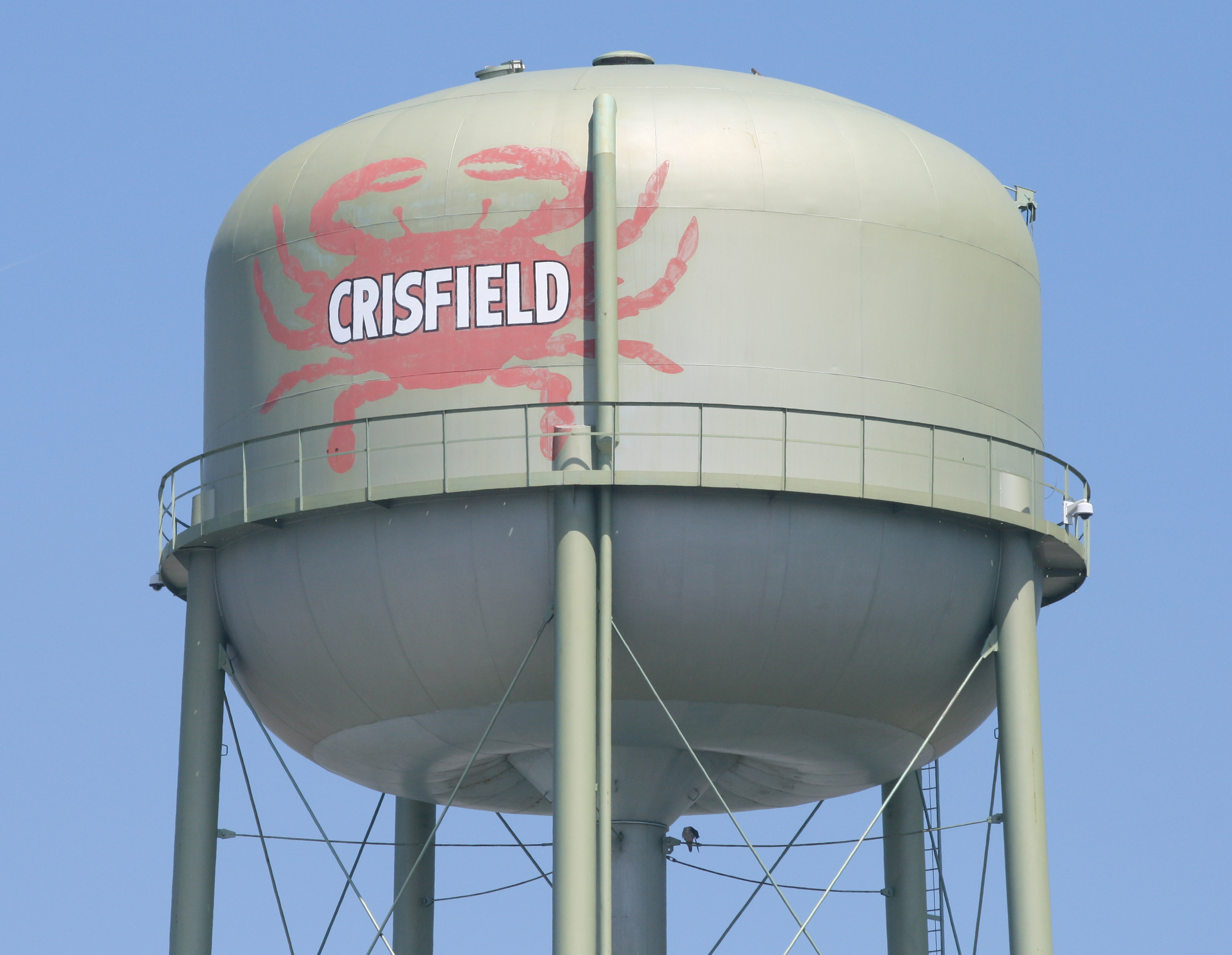
- Crisfield water tower

- Flag Seal
- Nickname: The Seafood Capital of the World
- Location in Somerset County and the state of Maryland

- Location within the state of Maryland Crisfield (the United States)
- Coordinates: 37°59′3″N 75°51′8″W
- Country: United States
- State: Maryland
- County: Somerset
- Founded: 1663
- Incorporation: 1872
- Founder: Benjamin Summers
- Named for: John Woodland Crisfield

Government
  - Type: Mayor–council–manager
  - Mayor: Darlene Taylor
  - Crisfield City Council: Council members: LaVerne Johnson (Council Vice President); Barbara Ward; James Ford Jr.; Gail Lankford; Nelson Sheppard

Area
  - Total: 3.17 sq mi (8.22 km^{2})
  - Land: 1.73 sq mi (4.49 km^{2})
  - Water: 1.44 sq mi (3.72 km^{2})
- Elevation: 3.3 ft (1 m)
- Lowest elevation: 0 ft (0 m)

Population (2020)
  - Total: 2,475
  - Density: 1,426.1/sq mi (550.61/km^{2})
  - Demonym: Crisfielder
- Time zone: UTC−5 (Eastern (EST))
  - Summer (DST): UTC−4 (EDT)
- ZIP code: 21817
- Area codes: 410, 443
- FIPS code: 24-20775
- GNIS feature ID: 0583972
- Website: www.cityofcrisfield-md.gov

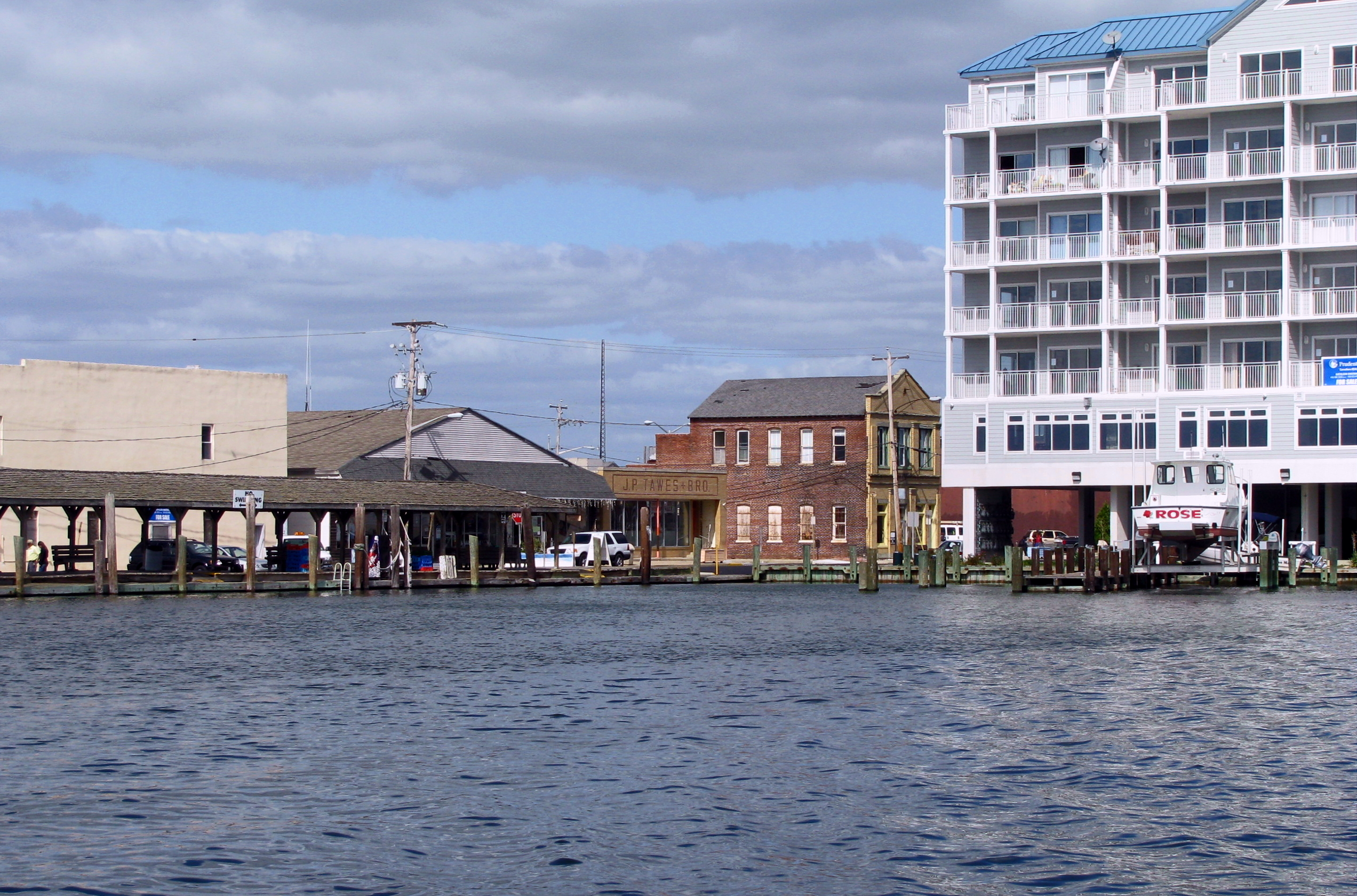
Crisfield's waterfront and town pier

Crisfield is a city in Somerset County, Maryland, United States, located on the Tangier Sound, an arm of the Chesapeake Bay. The population was 2,515 at the 2020 census. It is included in the Salisbury, Maryland-Delaware Metropolitan Statistical Area. Crisfield has the distinction of being the southernmost incorporated city in Maryland.

The site of today's Crisfield was initially a small fishing village called Annemessex Neck. During European colonization, it was renamed Somers Cove, after Benjamin Summers. When the business potential for seafood was discovered, John W. Crisfield decided to bring the Pennsylvania Railroad to Crisfield, and the quiet fishing town grew. Crisfield is now known as the "Seafood Capital of the World". The city's success was so great that the train soot and oyster shells prompted the extension of the city's land into the marshes. City residents often claim that the downtown area is literally built atop oyster shells.

Crisfield began to slip into decline along with the declining health of the Chesapeake Bay, prompting a "strategic revitalization plan" to address the city's future needs. Currently, Crisfield is largely a tourist destination. It hosts many annual events and festivals, the most prominent of which is the National Hard Crab Derby. Crisfield is also a major gateway to Smith Island and Tangier Island.

== History ==
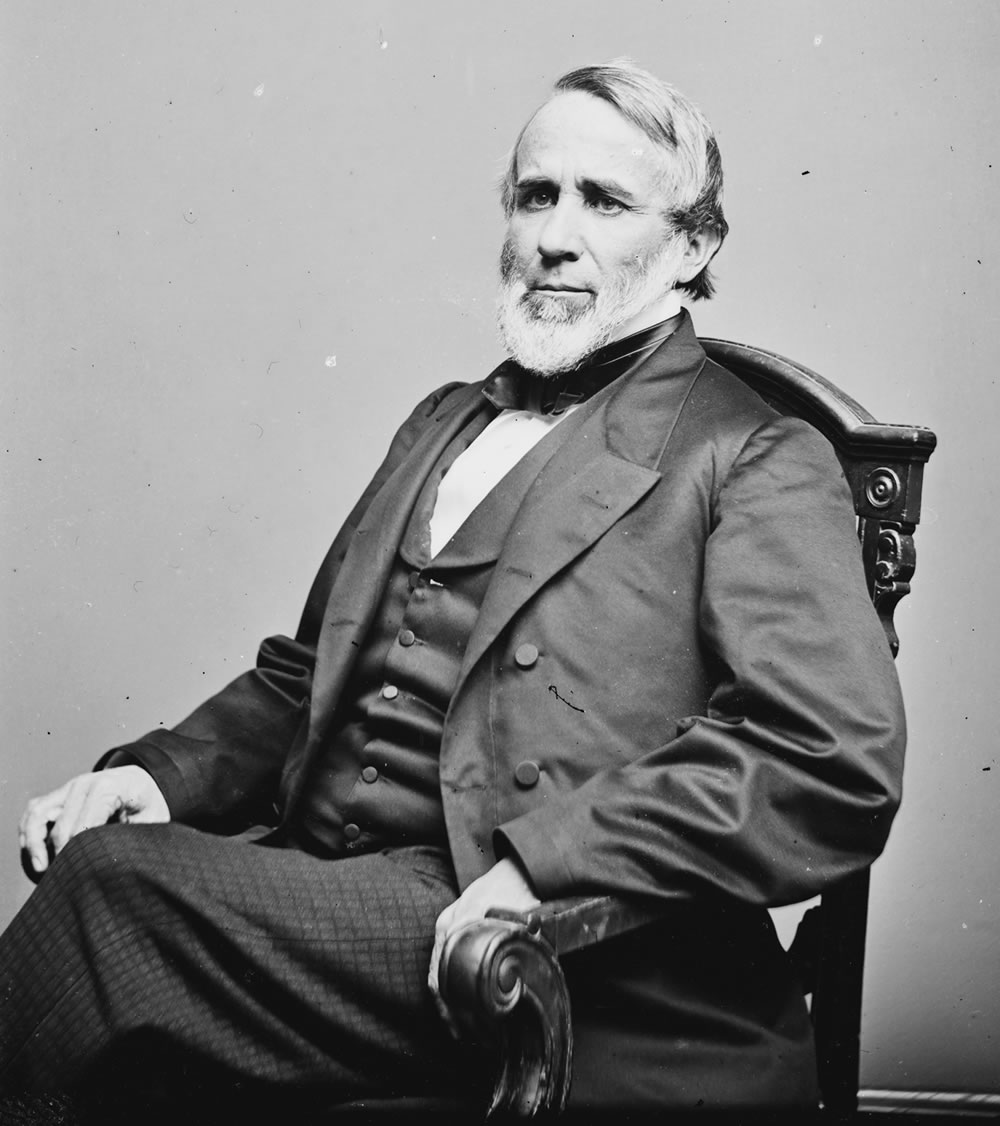
John W. Crisfield was president of the Eastern Shore Railroad and brought the railroad to what is now Crisfield.

The Annamessex, a Native American tribe related to the Pocomoke people, were indigenous to the region. Their small fishing village was known as Annemessex Neck. The nearby Annemessex River is also named after them.

On February 10, 1663, Benjamin Summers, a settler from Yorkshire or Hertfordshire, England, arrived from Northampton County, Virginia to claim his headright. He patented a 300-acre (1.21 km^{2}) [though in actuality only 250 acres (1.01 km^{2})] parcel of land, which he named "Emmessex". He later patented another 200 acres (0.81 km^{2}) of land on September 23, 1683, naming it "Musketa Hummock". Both of these plots of land are located in the present-day Crisfield Election District. Another plot of land, named "Little Worth" and totalling 100 acres (0.40 km^{2}), was also patented in Annemessex. These three plots of land would eventually come to be known collectively as Somers Cove.

Somers Cove soon became a major East Coast distribution center for seafood. The town grew faster than other settlements on the Delmarva Peninsula, with over 100 buildings in 1804, while Princess Anne and Salisbury had 40 and 4 respectively.

In 1854, a survey of the Chesapeake Bay revealed that the area was a lucrative fishing location, with extensive oyster beds around Somers Cove.

In 1866, John W. Crisfield, a Princess Anne attorney, was instrumental in bringing the Eastern Shore Railroad, a branch of the Pennsylvania Railroad system, to the Somers Cove seaport. The Crisfield Secondary Branch of the railroad opened on November 6 of that year. The town was formally incorporated in 1872 as a city, and renamed Crisfield in honor of the attorney's efforts. The railroad bolstered the economy of the new city and Crisfield prospered greatly, as did other towns and settlements along its route, such as Marion Station to the north.

Seafood was soon being shipped all over the United States, and Crisfield became known as the "Seafood Capital of the World", a nickname still carried by the city. An industrial boom followed. The city's seafood industry attracted new residents from as far away as New England and the Midwestern United States. The city also had a baseball team before long: the Crisfield Crabbers, who played in the Eastern Shore Baseball League.

The success of the city's seafood industry filled the city with train soot and large quantities of oyster shells. Around the turn of the 20th century, businessmen would buy plots of land at the southwest edge of the city and discard the shells and soot into the salt marshes. This shell midden eventually grew to become a peninsula roughly a half-mile long. Downtown Crisfield was built atop this new land, and this leads to the common statement that Crisfield was so prosperous that it is "literally built on top of oyster shells".

James Reed, an African American native to North Carolina was lynched by a mob of whites in Crisfield, Maryland on July 28, 1907. He was thought to have killed the local police chief.

The city experienced several fires, the most well-known of which is known as the Great Fire of 1928. It began on March 29 at the Crisfield Opera House and quickly spread to the downtown area, completely destroying it and causing over $1 million in damages.

Crisfield's prosperity began to decline along with the health of the Chesapeake Bay. Oyster populations declined to the point where the watermen could no longer fully support themselves on their daily catches. Some businesses began to move out of Crisfield, while others shut down. On April 1, 1976, the railroad that had brought prosperity to Crisfield was abandoned as Conrail was established. However, Maryland Route 413, a new, straight vehicular highway was built before the railroad was abandoned, along the railroad right-of-way. As large businesses in the United States grew, they passed the shrinking Crisfield by until the late 20th century. Fast-food restaurants began to slowly find business in the city, starting in the late 1990s, alongside the many seafood restaurants already in town. A large supermarket had been in city plans for a decade, though it wasn't until April 2010 that it opened for business. Crisfield has also been a target for large waterfront properties, with several large condominiums being built in the mid-2000s in the downtown area, along with other places flanking Crisfield's harbors. A "strategic revitalization plan" has been in the works since 2006 to address future growing needs and beautification of the city.

In 2012, Hurricane Sandy affected the town as many businesses and homes were flooded.

The Crisfield Armory, Crisfield Historic District, Cullen Homestead Historic District, Make Peace, Nelson Homestead, Capt. Leonard Tawes House, and Ward Brothers' House and Shop are listed on the National Register of Historic Places.

== Geography ==
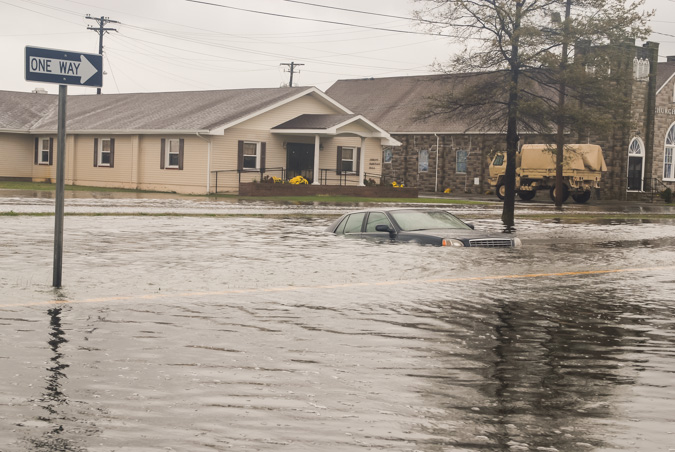
Flooding from Hurricane Sandy

Crisfield is a very compact city, with little vacant land. According to the United States Census Bureau, the city has a total area of 3.06 square miles (7.93 km^{2}), of which 1.62 square miles (4.20 km^{2}) (53.0%) is land and 1.44 square miles (3.73 km^{2}) (47.0%) is water. As one of the southern points on the Delmarva Peninsula and one very close to the Chesapeake Bay, the city is extremely flat, with the elevation never rising above 3 feet (0.91 m).

The city of Crisfield is surrounded by salt marshes and was built on a floodplain. The downtown is especially prone to flooding during large storms and hurricanes. On October 29, 2012, Hurricane Sandy's storm surge left most of the city underwater. Ongoing local concerns about flooding and the impact of sea level rise were featured in The Washington Post in October 2013.

Crisfield is the southernmost city in the state of Maryland; the point farthest south is geographically located at Ape Hole. Regardless of this, Southern Maryland is an official region of the state not associated with the Eastern Shore, and areas of Saint Mary's County are sometimes claimed to be the southernmost point of the state.

=== Climate ===
Crisfield's location on the Atlantic Coastal Plain in Maryland gives it a humid subtropical climate, with hot, humid summers and cool to mild winters. Its proximity to water, as well as a common trend on the Delmarva Peninsula, means that the city does not see much snowfall in the winters; meaning Crisfield as well as Inner Harbor Baltimore, and the border of Assateague Island on the Atlantic Barrier Island are the only hardiness zone 8a examples in Maryland.

Climate data for Crisfield, Maryland
Month	Jan	Feb	Mar	Apr	May	Jun	Jul	Aug	Sep	Oct	Nov	Dec	Year
Record high °F (°C)	64 (18)	69 (21)	77 (25)	87 (31)	91 (33)	92 (33)	99 (37)	98 (37)	92 (33)	90 (32)	78 (26)	71 (22)	99 (37)
Mean daily maximum °F (°C)	44 (7)	47 (8)	55 (13)	65 (18)	74 (23)	82 (28)	87 (31)	85 (29)	79 (26)	69 (21)	58 (14)	49 (9)	66 (19)
Mean daily minimum °F (°C)	30 (−1)	31 (−1)	38 (3)	48 (9)	57 (14)	66 (19)	71 (22)	71 (22)	64 (18)	53 (12)	43 (6)	34 (1)	51 (10)
Record low °F (°C)	−1 (−18)	3 (−16)	10 (−12)	27 (−3)	38 (3)	46 (8)	51 (11)	50 (10)	45 (7)	30 (−1)	22 (−6)	7 (−14)	−1 (−18)
Average precipitation inches (mm)	3.25 (83)	3.00 (76)	4.29 (109)	2.81 (71)	3.12 (79)	2.83 (72)	4.14 (105)	4.15 (105)	2.76 (70)	2.78 (71)	2.80 (71)	2.51 (64)	38.44 (976)
Source: Weather.com

== Demographics ==
Historical population
Census	Pop.	Note	%±
1880	986		—
1890	1,565		58.7%
1900	3,165		102.2%
1910	3,468		9.6%
1920	4,116		18.7%
1930	3,850		−6.5%
1940	3,908		1.5%
1950	3,688		−5.6%
1960	3,540		−4.0%
1970	3,078		−13.1%
1980	2,924		−5.0%
1990	2,880		−1.5%
2000	2,723		−5.5%
2010	2,726		0.1%
2020	2,475		−9.2%
U.S. Decennial Census

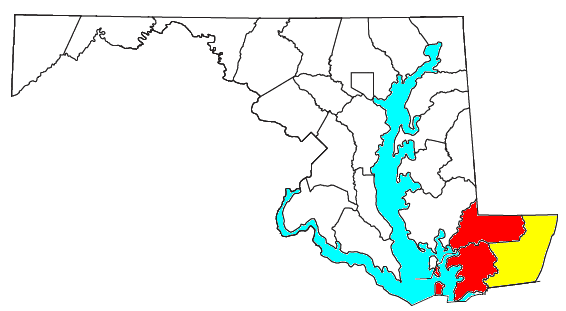
Location of the Salisbury-Ocean Pines CSA and its components: Salisbury Metropolitan Statistical Area Ocean Pines Micropolitan Statistical Area

Crisfield is part of the Salisbury-Ocean Pines CSA, a combined statistical area (CSA) which includes the Salisbury metropolitan area (Somerset and Wicomico counties) and the Ocean Pines micropolitan area (Worcester County), which had a combined population of 155,934 at the 2000 census. Salisbury is the principal city of this CSA.

=== 2020 census ===
As of the 2020 census, Crisfield had a population of 2,475. The median age was 42.3 years. 25.3% of residents were under the age of 18 and 21.3% of residents were 65 years of age or older. For every 100 females there were 79.5 males, and for every 100 females age 18 and over there were 74.9 males age 18 and over.

98.9% of residents lived in urban areas, while 1.1% lived in rural areas.

There were 1,081 households in Crisfield, of which 30.3% had children under the age of 18 living in them. Of all households, 28.4% were married-couple households, 20.5% were households with a male householder and no spouse or partner present, and 43.8% were households with a female householder and no spouse or partner present. About 37.7% of all households were made up of individuals and 19.1% had someone living alone who was 65 years of age or older.

There were 1,518 housing units, of which 28.8% were vacant. The homeowner vacancy rate was 5.8% and the rental vacancy rate was 8.0%.

Racial composition as of the 2020 census
Race	Number	Percent
White	1,427	57.7%
Black or African American	808	32.6%
American Indian and Alaska Native	13	0.5%
Asian	25	1.0%
Native Hawaiian and Other Pacific Islander	0	0.0%
Some other race	78	3.2%
Two or more races	124	5.0%
Hispanic or Latino (of any race)	158	6.4%

=== 2010 census ===
As of the census of 2010, there were 2,726 people, 1,113 households, and 667 families residing in the city. The population density was 1,682.7 inhabitants per square mile (649.7/km^{2}). There were 1,531 housing units at an average density of 945.1 per square mile (364.9/km^{2}). The racial makeup of the city was 59.0% White, 36.4% African American, 0.6% Native American, 0.5% Asian, 1.3% from other races, and 2.3% from two or more races. Hispanic or Latino of any race were 3.7% of the population.

There were 1,113 households, of which 33.6% had children under the age of 18 living with them, 30.1% were married couples living together, 25.8% had a female householder with no husband present, 4.0% had a male householder with no wife present, and 40.1% were non-families. 35.4% of all households were made up of individuals, and 15.4% had someone living alone who was 65 years of age or older. The average household size was 2.38 and the average family size was 3.06.

The median age in the city was 38.4 years. 27.8% of residents were under the age of 18; 8.3% were between the ages of 18 and 24; 21.5% were from 25 to 44; 24.6% were from 45 to 64; and 17.7% were 65 years of age or older. The gender makeup of the city was 44.0% male and 56.0% female.

=== 2000 census ===
As of the census of 2000, there were 2,723 people, 1,172 households, and 723 families residing in the city. The population density was 1,674.9 inhabitants per square mile (646.7/km^{2}). There were 1,357 housing units at an average density of 834.7 per square mile (322.3/km^{2}). The racial makeup of the city was 58.54% White, 37.46% African American, 0.40% Native American, 0.51% Asian, 0.04% Pacific Islander, 0.37% from other races, and 2.68% from two or more races. Hispanic or Latino of any race were 1.65% of the population.

There were 1,172 households, out of which 30.3% had children under the age of 18 living with them, 32.9% were married couples living together, 25.4% had a female householder with no husband present, and 38.3% were non-families. 34.3% of all households were made up of individuals, and 18.9% had someone living alone who was 65 years of age or older. The average household size was 2.30 and the average family size was 2.92.

In the city, the age distribution of the population shows 27.8% under the age of 18, 8.3% from 18 to 24, 24.5% from 25 to 44, 21.2% from 45 to 64, and 18.1% who were 65 years of age or older. The median age was 37 years. For every 100 females, there were 75.6 males. For every 100 females age 18 and over, there were 71.3 males.

The median income for a household in the city was $17,979, and the median income for a family was $23,929. Males had a median income of $30,078 versus $20,670 for females. The per capita income for the city was $12,387. About 30.5% of families and 34.2% of the population were below the poverty line, including 46.8% of those under age 18 and 30.2% of those age 65 or over.

=== Crime ===
Crisfield gained a new police chief in 2007—Chief Michael L. Tabor, who retired from the Baltimore Police Department to head law enforcement in the city. Since then, crime rates have been on a steady decline, generally halving between 2006 and 2008. The most prevalent crime in the city is property crime, down from a high of 180 in 2006 to 92 in 2008. Theft is also very common. Violent crimes, such as murder and forcible rape, are rare, though the numbers for those are on the decline as well. In January 2010, it was reported that Crisfield experienced an 81% decrease in crime rates of all kinds since 2007.

== Economy ==
Crisfield's economy is centered largely around retail, health care, and automotive. Seafood is also an important part of Crisfield's economy, just as it has been for most of its existence, with several packing plants existing within the city. In 1997, the company CrabPlace.com began selling seafood online, caught by local watermen.

The largest employer inside Crisfield's limits is the McCready Memorial Hospital. The second largest employer in the city is the Sherwin-Williams plant (formerly Rubberset company), which manufactures paintbrushes and roller covers.

In the past, the economy was centered on the watermen and seafood. About 150 seafood processing and packing plants were located within the city in its heyday. As the health of the Chesapeake Bay began to decline, so did the numbers for the blue crab catch, which have fallen by 70% since the 1990s. Regulations have been placed on harvest of female crabs in order to control overharvesting.

Most of the labor force in Crisfield works outside of the city and elsewhere on the peninsula—the largest seafood employer in Somerset County is located nearby in Hopewell. Additionally, a new industrial park, slated for construction as early as September 2013 just north of Crisfield, near Carvel Hall and along MD 413, will expand Crisfield's corporate limits.

== Culture ==
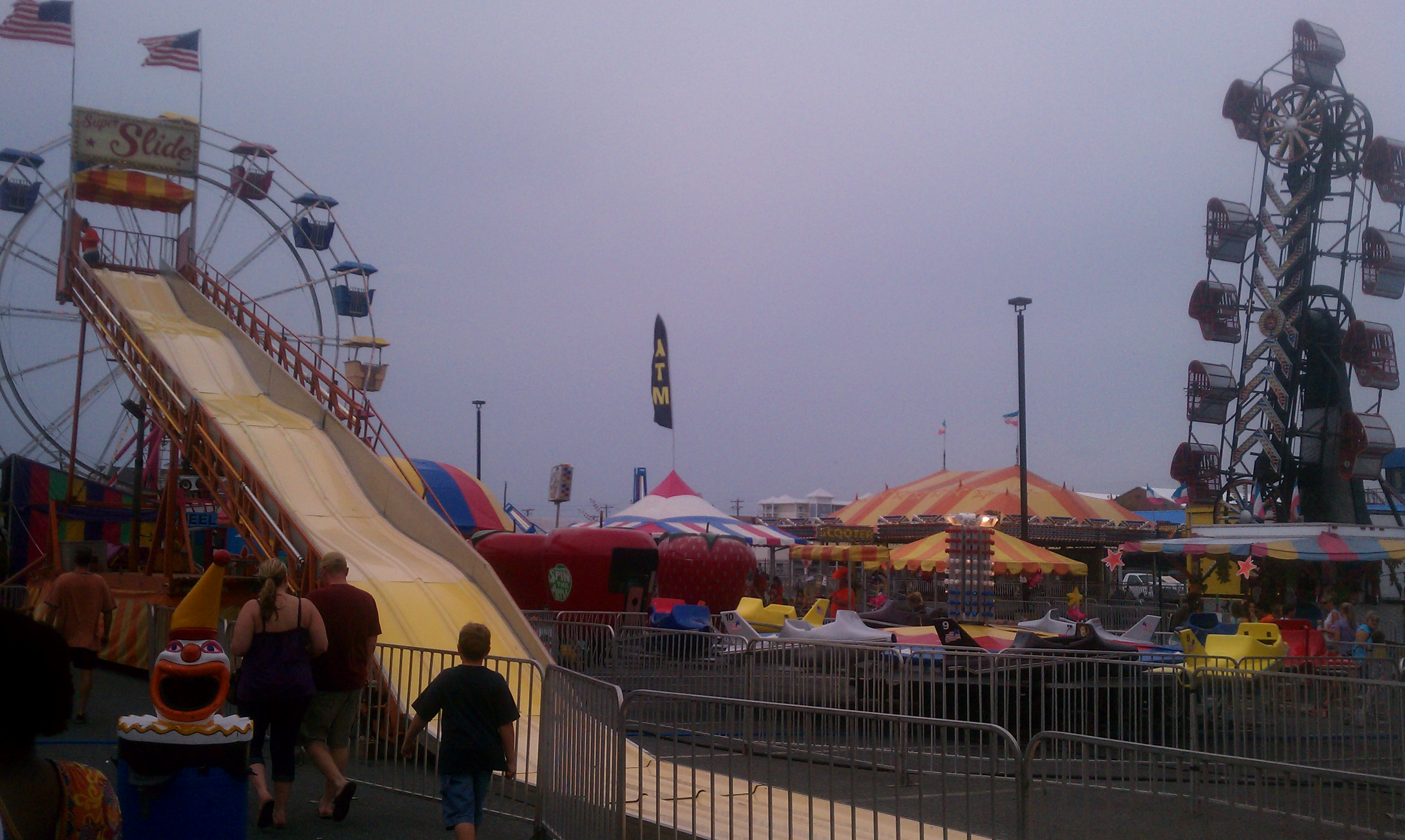
National Hard Crab Derby Fair

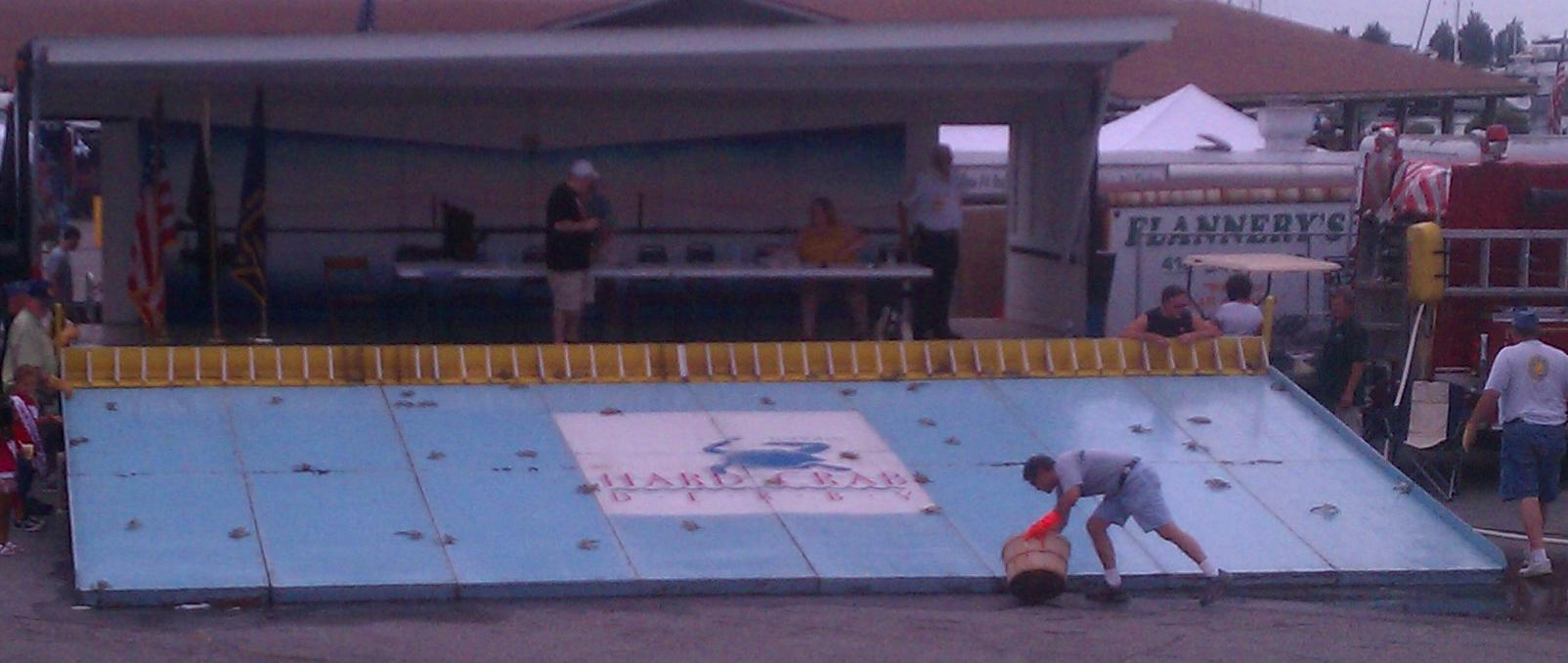
View of one of the crab races, nearing completion.

Due to Crisfield being the main access point to Smith Island, it is an area with many speakers of the unique Smith Island accent. It also serves Smith Island cake, the Maryland state dessert, in many of its restaurants.

=== Annual events ===
Since 1986, Crisfield has hosted the Scorchy Tawes Pro-Am Fishing Tournament. The 3-day tournament features cash prizes for different fishing categories, and nightly block-parties at Side Street Restaurant.

The annual J. Millard Tawes Crab and Clam Bake takes place in September each year. The event, which began in 1976, is named for the former governor born in Crisfield, and attracts many politicians from across the state each year.

Crisfield's largest event is the annual National Hard Crab Derby & Fair, held every Labor Day weekend, which began in 1947. Major highlights of the Crab Derby include a parade through Main Street, the Little Miss, Little Mr. and Miss Crustacean Pageants, the Boat Docking Contest (which began in 1971), the Crab Picking contest, and the Crab Bowl. The Crab Bowl turns the Somers Cove Marina into fairgrounds with rides, concerts, vendor stands, and fireworks.

=== Museums ===
Crisfield has several museums: the J. Millard Tawes Historical Museum, the Ward Brothers Workshop, and the J. Millard Tawes Library.

== Government ==
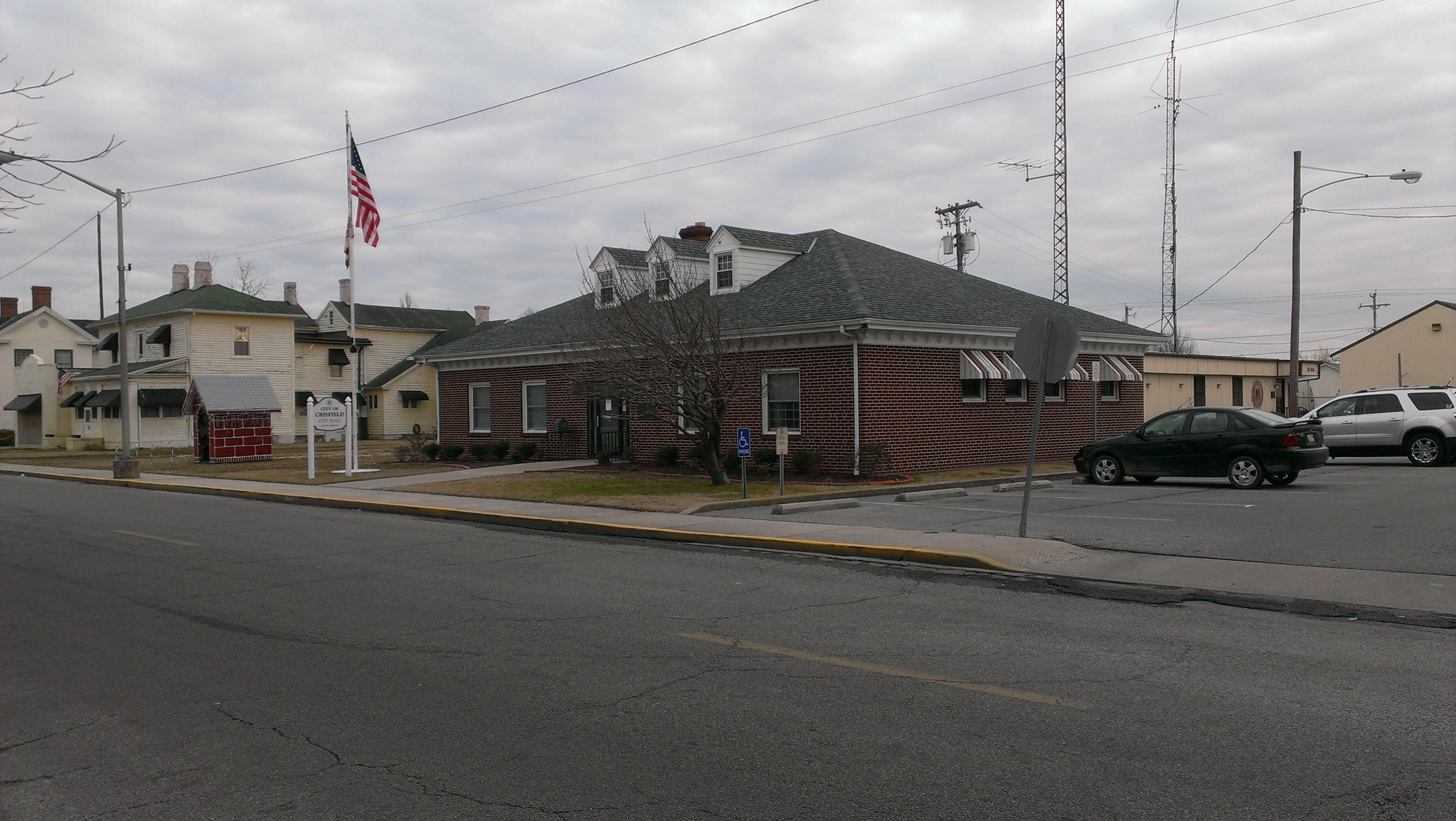
A view of Crisfield City Hall from Main Street.

Crisfield is said to have a mayor–council–manager government. Administration is handled by the City Manager, who is appointed by the mayor and city council. The mayor is elected by the citizens of Crisfield, and the council members are as well. All serve four-year terms.

== Sports and recreation ==
The city once had a minor league baseball team: the Crisfield Crabbers, who played in now-defunct Eastern Shore Baseball League. Several little league baseball and high school sports teams remain in the city.

Wellington Beach and Park was open with life guards and concession stand in the 1980s, but closed. However, through Program Open Space, Crisfield received funding to build and reopen it. Crisfield's public Wellington Beach and Park reopened in early 2012 as Brick Kiln Beach. However, after Hurricane Sandy hit later that year, the beach required major reconstruction. The beach was renamed and reopened to the public on June 2, 2013 at 1:00 PM. The park has a play area, a gazebo, and bathrooms during the summer months. It also is a popular crabbing spot.

Nearby Janes Island State Park is a large marshy island made of almost completely undeveloped land, and is colonized by various birds and marine life. It offers fishing, swimming beaches, picnicking, camping, a playground, and has about thirty miles of water trails which can be accessed by canoe. The beaches allow swimming as well.

== Education ==
=== Public schools ===
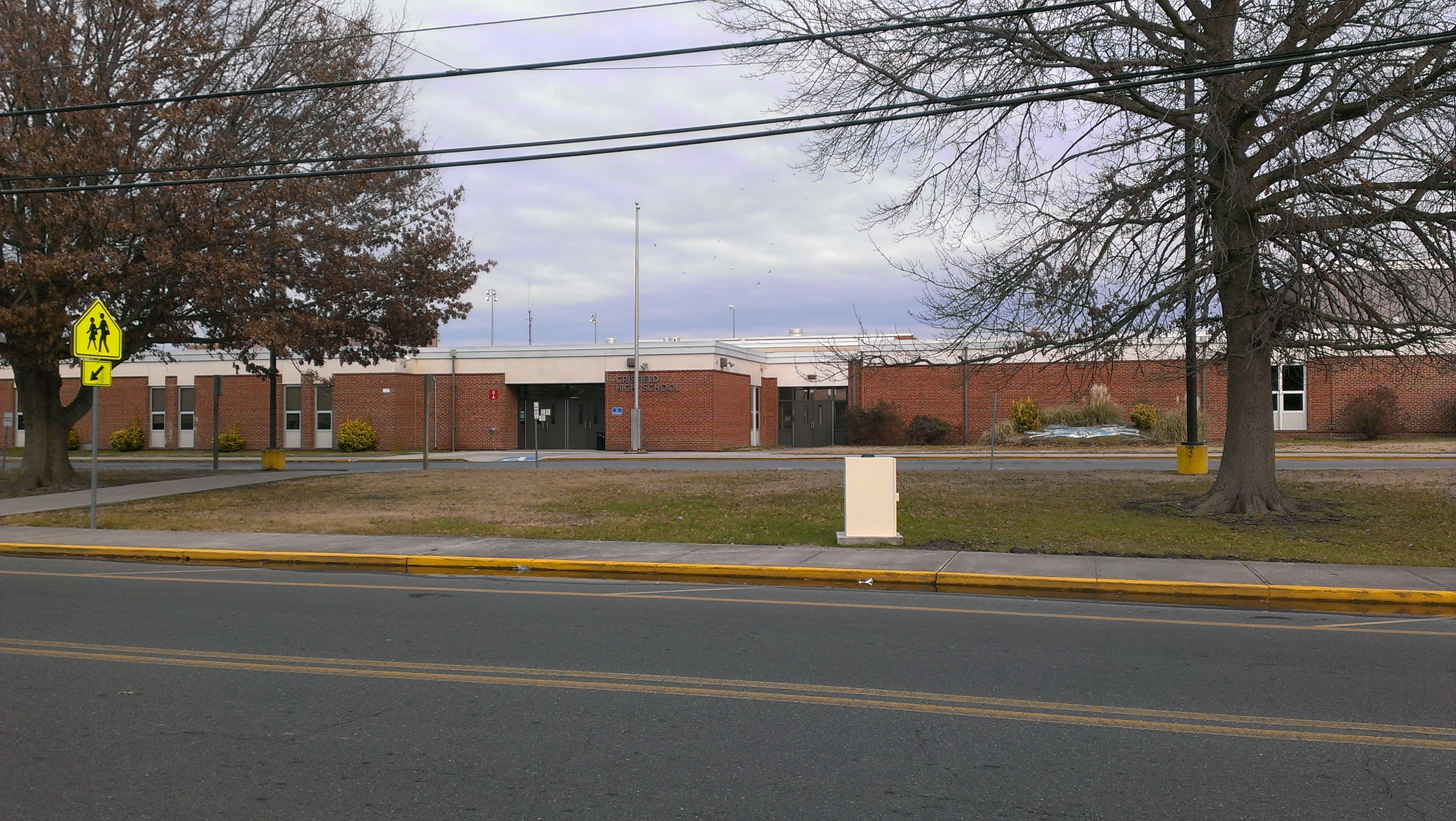
Crisfield High School

Crisfield's two public schools are part of the Somerset County Public Schools district, which is headquartered in Westover.

- Carter G. Woodson Elementary School − This school is located on South Somerset Avenue and currently serves grades K−5. This was changed from 2004, where it was the middle school, serving grades 6−8; school consolidation in the county changed the school and gave it a renovation. Much earlier than that, the school was the Crisfield Colored High School.
- Crisfield Academy and High School − Originally known as just Crisfield High School, this building is located on North Somerset Avenue between the intersections of Potomac Street and Mercury Drive, and serves grades 8−12. Before consolidation, it handled grades 9−12. The school is the first educational facility built beyond the original Crisfield Academy, and has existed in four different buildings on three different sites, all located close to or on Somerset Avenue.

== Transportation ==
=== Travel by water ===
As Crisfield's heritage is on the water, it has many points of access to the Tangier Sound and Chesapeake Bay.

Crisfield has two public docks. The city dock is located at the end of Main Street (MD 413). The city dock is the landing for mail ships, large commercial ships, and passenger ferries to Smith Island and Reedville, Virginia via Tangier Island. The city dock pavilion is a popular site for public events. The county dock, located one block west at the end of Broad Street, is largely used for freight, and was rehabilitated in the mid-2000s. The Little Boat Harbor, located on Brick Kiln Road is utilized mostly by smaller workboats.

Somers Cove Marina, a large marina built in Crisfield in the 1960s, is currently owned by the State of Maryland. The marina hosts many of the city's large events, such as the National Hard Crab Derby.

Throughout Crisfield's history, there has been discussion of a high-speed ferry link between Crisfield and the Western Shore, with large vessels that can accommodate large numbers of vehicles and tractor-trailers. The proposed site for a Western Shore landing has ranged from Point Lookout State Park in Maryland to Reedville in Northumberland County, Virginia. Proponents state that a high-speed ferry link will reduce travel times to adjacent points on the western shore by as much as two and a half hours as the Bay Bridges are far from one another, spurring tourism and economic growth on both sides. The most recent proposal came in the 2000s; however, it was deemed that a ferry would not be economically feasible. Money earmarked for the ferry service was released to the city for an upgrade of the city dock.

=== Major roads ===
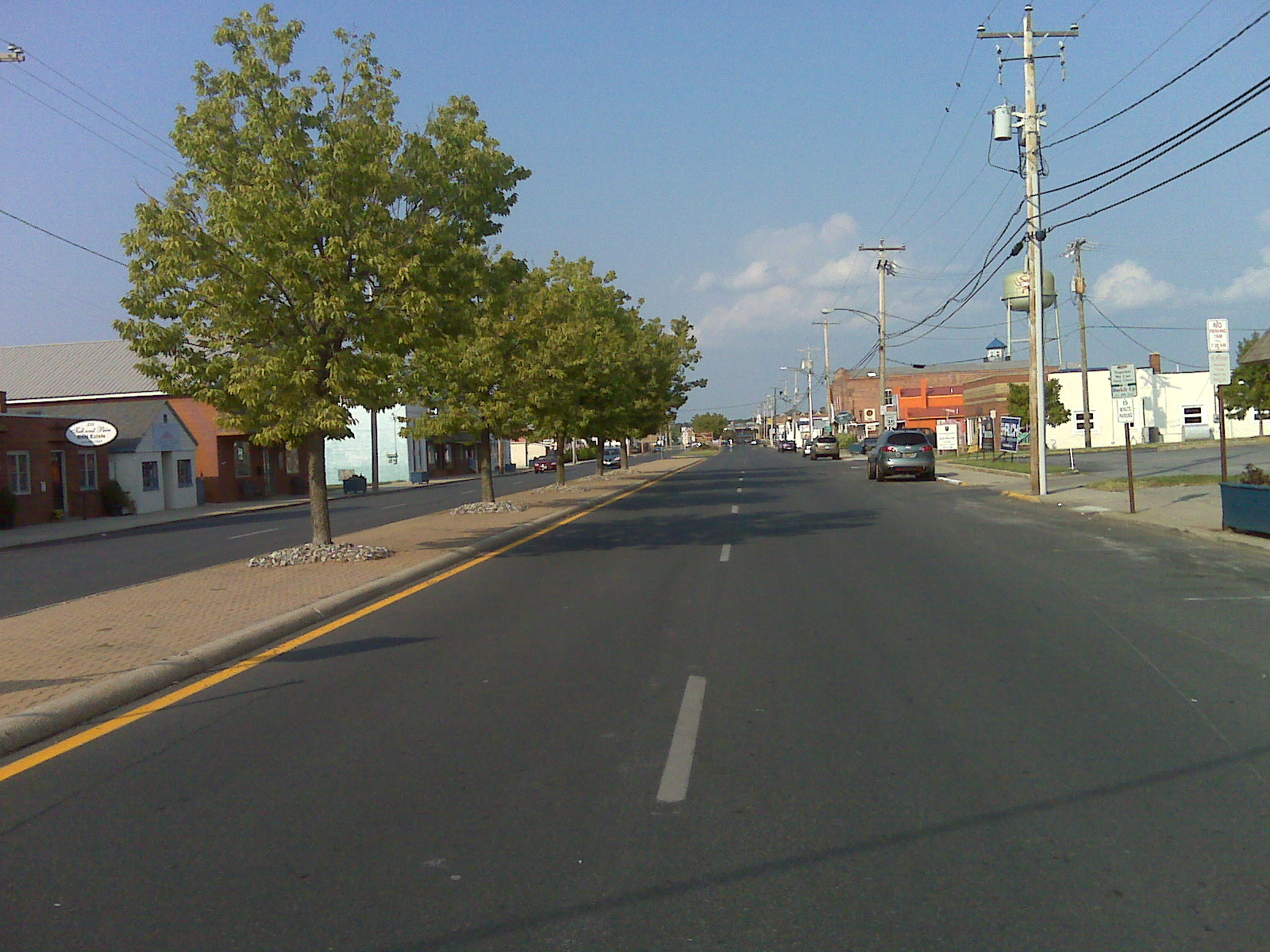
West Main Street (MD 413) in downtown Crisfield. The four-lane section of the highway within Crisfield's limits is known as "The Strip" among locals.

The city of Crisfield is accessible by two main state highways: Maryland Route 413 (the main route through the city and is known colloquially as "The Strip") and Maryland Route 667. Both routes connect directly to U.S. Route 13, the main north−south thoroughfare of the Delmarva Peninsula. Additionally, Maryland Route 358 (Jacksonville Road) leads to the nearby Janes Island State Park, and Maryland Route 460 (Hall Highway) is the main access point to the hospital. Maryland Route 380 (Byrdtown Road and Main Street Extension) lead to the Crisfield suburbs of Lawsonia and Byrdtown; this area is commonly referred to by the locals as "Down Neck".

Major streets not maintained by the state are Somerset Avenue, which is located at the northern edge of town and travels south, paralleling the eastern city boundary and fronted mostly by homes; all of the public schools in the city are located down this corridor. There is also Main Street, which provides access to City Hall, the post office, police department, and many of the businesses in the city. Main Street merges with Maryland Route 413 near the Crisfield Fire Department, becoming a four-lane boulevard. Broadway Avenue, running parallel to Main Street one block south, was once a major business center in the city as well, fronted by many businesses and churches and passed directly through the city's marina; however, it no longer reaches the marina, and a large number of the stores and warehouses along it have closed.

=== Bicycles and pedestrians ===
As part of expansion of bicycle infrastructure across the state of Maryland, MD 413 inside the city limits received bicycle lanes for almost its full length in 2017. Plans were also in place to convert the abandoned Crisfield Secondary Branch railroad alongside MD 413 north of the city into a paved rail trail, of which part of the plan included the bike lanes already installed in Crisfield. Construction of the rail-trail proceeded in three phases, beginning in 2019 from Crisfield to Davis Lane just south of the center of Marion Station. Phase 2 includes the rest of the trail's length and began construction in 2025 in Westover south to the Big Annemessex River. The final section, including a bridge over the Annemessex River and creating one continuous trail, anticipates bidding to begin in 2026.

=== Public transportation ===
The two bus routes serving Crisfield, Route 706 North and Route 706 South, are operated by Shore Transit, which provides the commuter bus service for the lower Eastern Shore. Both routes travel along Somerset Avenue and MD 413, and Cove Street, and stop at McCready Memorial Hospital. All buses provide access to the Princess Anne transfer hub with limited service to Salisbury; thus riders can get access to other points on the Eastern Shore.

=== Airports ===
The Crisfield Municipal Airport is located near Hopewell. The main access road to the airport is on Plantation Road in Hopewell, south of the MD 667 intersection there; from Crisfield it is accessible via Jacksonville Road. The airport has been a recent target for expansion.

== Infrastructure ==
=== Public utilities ===
Crisfield possesses three water towers and a public sewer system; both provide municipal services as far north as Plantation Road in Hopewell. The most recent water tower was installed in the early 2000s. It also has a sewage water treatment plant, which is notably overburdened and obsolete.

The main electrical provider in the city is Delmarva Power, owned by Exelon, and a large substation is located north of town. Choptank Electric Cooperative also serves the city's outskirts. In the past, Crisfield possessed a power plant, located downtown on Seventh Street. This was removed around the time of the decommissioning of the rail line, as the railroad once ended there; power is now tapped from a substation in Princess Anne via subtransmission line. The main telephone provider is Verizon Communications. In the mid-2000s, a fiber-optic cable was installed along the length of MD 413, improving internet service. A prominent cellphone tower was also installed in the center of Marion Station to the north in 2010.

=== Health care ===
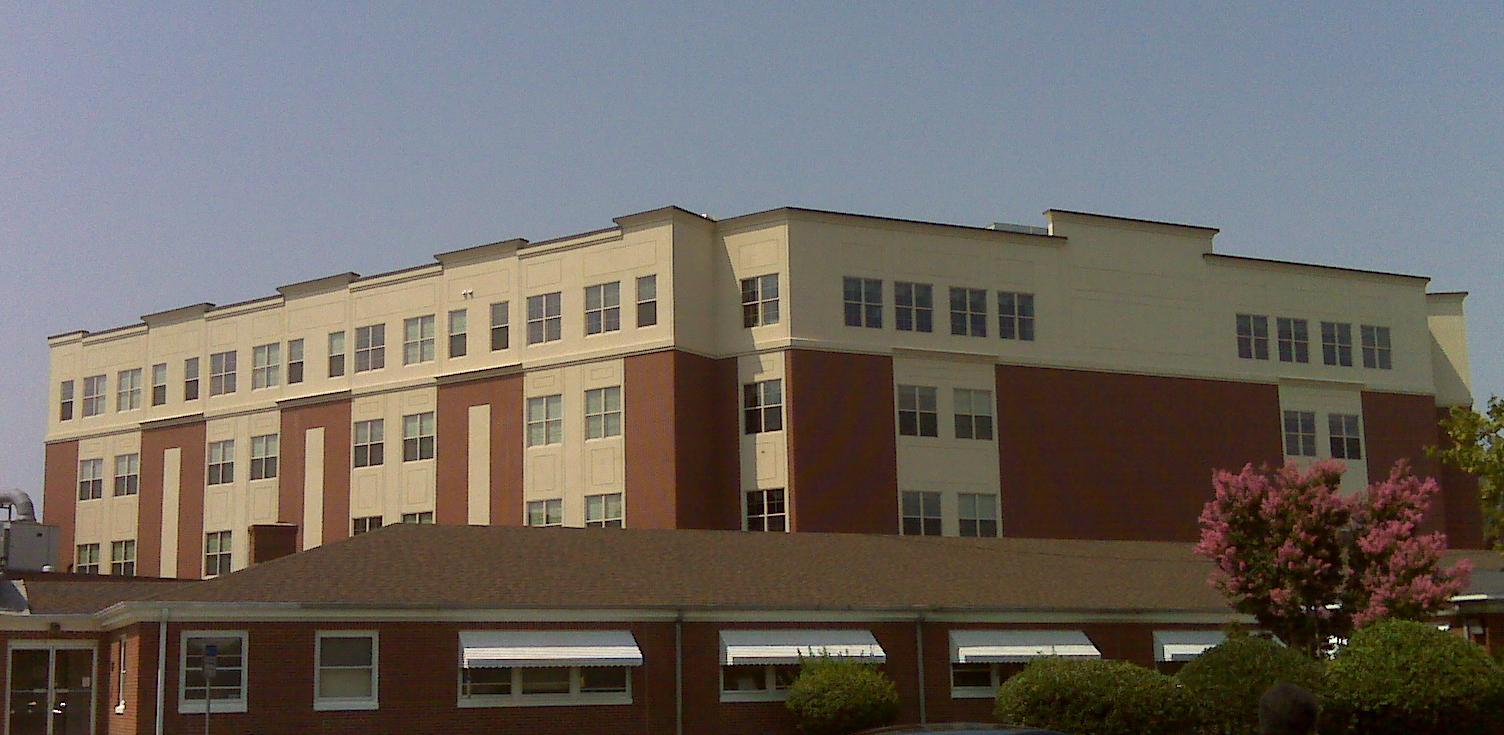
The newly constructed nursing home in Crisfield, with the original one in front of it. The original has since been demolished.

Crisfield is currently home to the only hospital in Somerset County: McCready Memorial Hospital, accessible by Hall Highway and by Byrd Road from the north on Jacksonville Road. The next closest hospital is Peninsula Regional Medical Center in Salisbury. McCready Hospital is located on the Annemessex River, and is flanked by the Alice Byrd Tawes Nursing Home, which was built in 1968 and was replaced by a new four-story building in 2010.

== Notable people ==
- Ward Brothers, famous wooden-carved, wildfowl, decoy makers
- J. Millard Tawes, 54th Governor of Maryland
- Harry Clifton Byrd, American university administrator, educator, athlete, coach, and politician

== In popular culture ==
Crisfield and its environs are the setting for most of the books in the Tillerman Cycle series by Cynthia Voigt.

The movie Hookman 2 was mostly filmed in Crisfield in winter 2010−2011 and was released in 2013. Crisfield is the hometown of most of the cast and crew members and is called "Hometown, Maryland" in the movie. The film is currently available on Amazon and YouTube.

Samantha Reilly, a character on Melrose Place portrayed by Brooke Langton, is from Crisfield.

== See also ==
- Eshelman
- Janes Island Light
- Marion Station, Maryland, a nearby community which also prospered due to the railroad and went into decline later
- Tulls Corner, Maryland, a nearby ghost town
- Crisfield Armory
- Crisfield Historic District
- WBEY-FM
