= Capt. Leonard Tawes House =

Historic house in Maryland, United States

- U.S. National Register of Historic Places
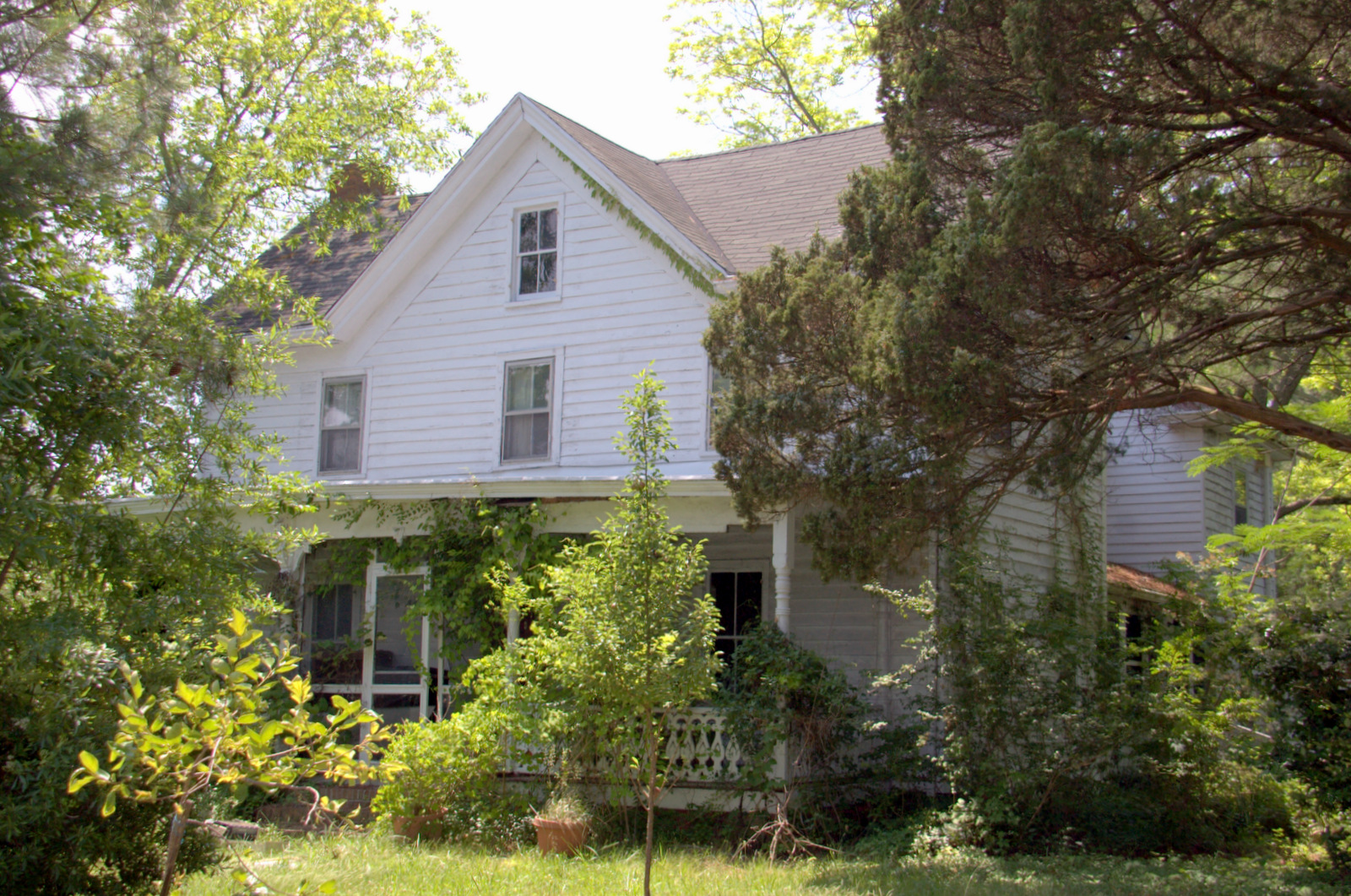

- Location within Maryland Location within the United States
- Location: Somerset Ave., Crisfield, Maryland
- Coordinates: 37°58′32″N 75°50′43″W
- Area: 2 acres (0.81 ha)
- Architectural style: Greek Revival, Late Victorian
- NRHP reference No.: 90000598
- Added to NRHP: April 5, 1990

The Capt. Leonard Tawes House is a historic home located at Crisfield, Somerset County, Maryland, United States. It is a frame two story house begun in the second quarter of the 19th century and extensively altered in the Late Victorian mode through the rest of the century. Also on the property is a garage, a storage shed, a stilted frame dairy, and a gable-roofed frame privy.

The Capt. Leonard Tawes House was listed on the National Register of Historic Places in 1985.
