= St. Peter's Methodist Episcopal Church =

Historic church in Maryland, United States

- U.S. National Register of Historic Places
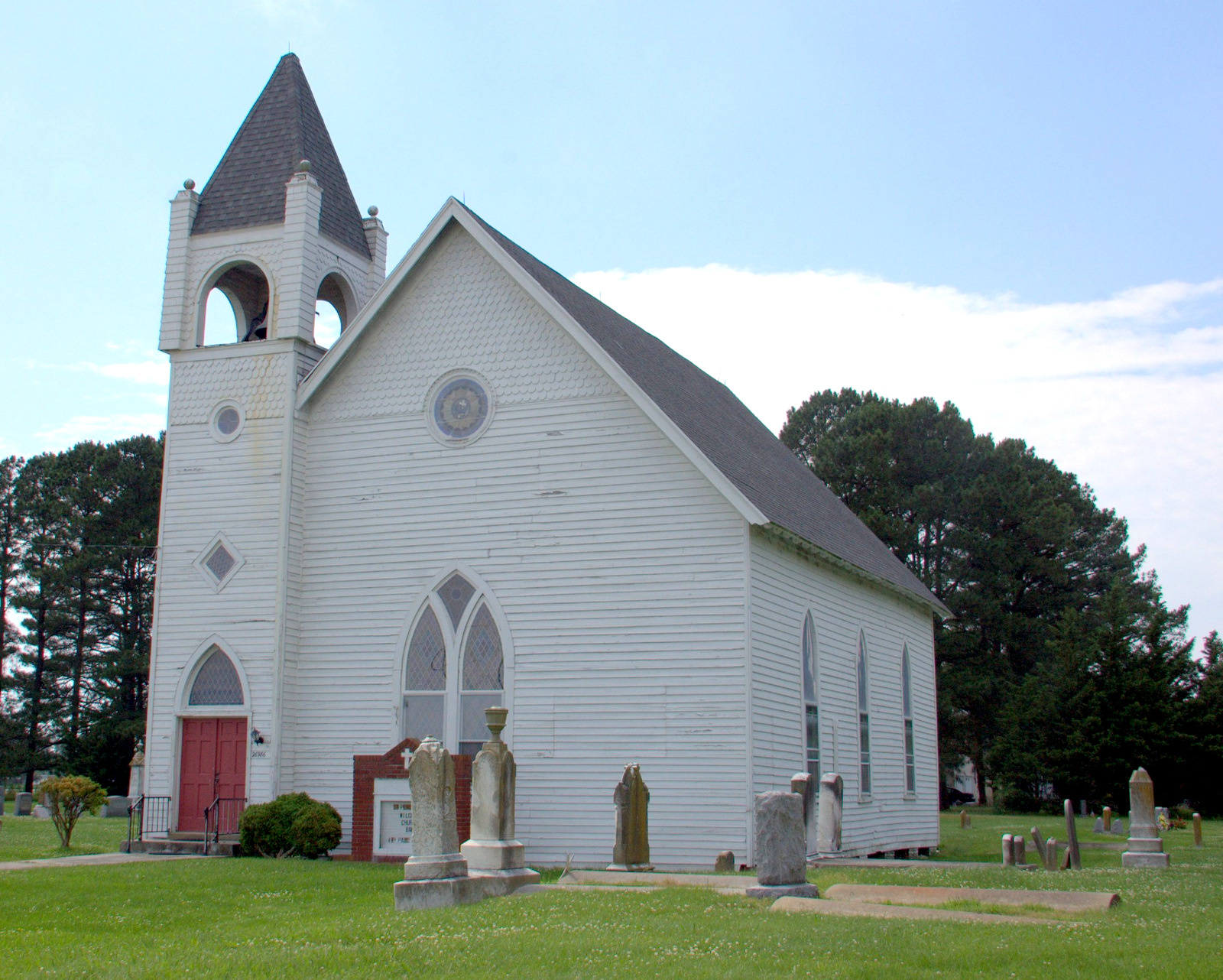

- Location within Maryland Location within the United States
- Location: Saint Peter's Church Road, Hopewell, Maryland
- Coordinates: 38°1′1″N 75°49′13″W
- Area: 2 acres (0.81 ha)
- Built: 1850, 1901
- Architectural style: Gothic
- NRHP reference No.: 90001721
- Added to NRHP: November 2, 1990

St. Peter's Methodist Episcopal Church is a historic Methodist Episcopal church located at Hopewell, Somerset County, Maryland, United States. It is a large single-story gable-front Gothic Revival frame church with four-story bell tower. It was built in 1850 and extensively reworked in 1901. Also on the property is a cemetery with 19th and 20th century markers.

It was listed on the National Register of Historic Places in 1990.
