= Crisfield Armory =

Historic building in Maryland, US

- U.S. National Register of Historic Places
- U.S. Historic district – Contributing property
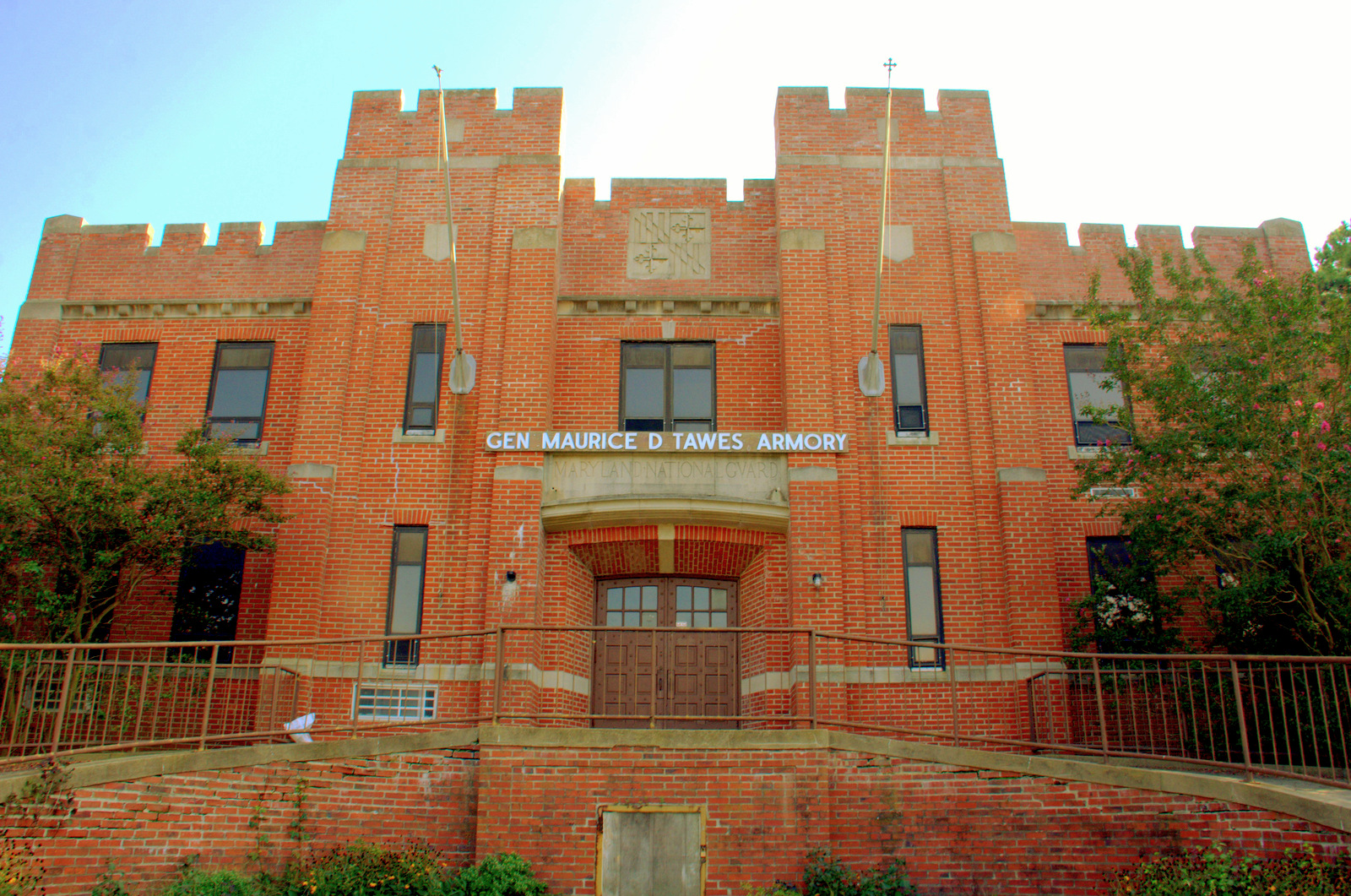

- Location within Maryland Location within the United States
- Location: Main St. Extended, Crisfield, Maryland
- Coordinates: 38°0′29″N 75°50′34″W
- Area: 1.6 acres (0.65 ha)
- Built: 1927
- Architectural style: Medieval
- MPS: Maryland National Guard Armories TR
- NRHP reference No.: 85002669
- Added to NRHP: September 25, 1985

The Crisfield Armory is a historic National Guard armory located at Crisfield, Somerset County, Maryland, United States. It is two stories tall with a full basement, emulates a medieval fortification, and was built in 1927. Attached to the rear of this two-story main block is a narrower one-story drill hall. The front features a central section flanked by two, three-story tall towers. The State Seal of Maryland appears in a large square stone panel at the roofline, surmounted by three crenelles with stone caps. It is located within the boundaries of the Crisfield Historic District.

The Crisfield Armory was listed on the National Register of Historic Places in 1985.
