= Crisfield Historic District =

Historic district in Maryland, United States

- U.S. National Register of Historic Places
- U.S. Historic district
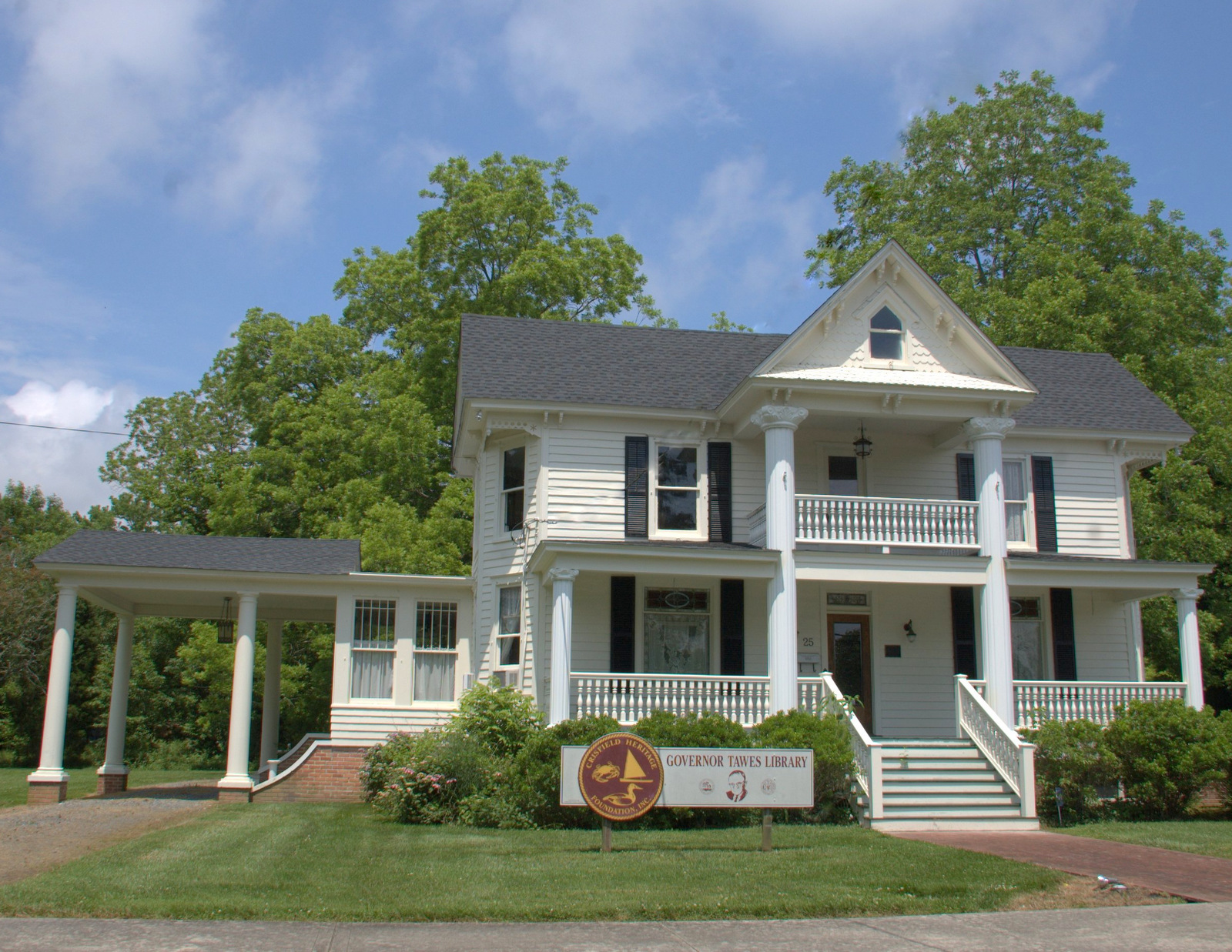

- Location within Maryland Location within the United States
- Location: Roughly bounded by Chesapeake Ave., Maryland Ave., 4th and Cove Sts., including area between Asbury Ave. and E. Main St., Crisfield, Maryland
- Coordinates: 37°58′53″N 75°50′57″W
- Area: 105 acres (42 ha)
- Architectural style: Colonial Revival, Late Victorian, Queen Anne
- NRHP reference No.: 90001018
- Added to NRHP: July 9, 1990

Crisfield Historic District is a national historic district at Crisfield, Somerset County, Maryland, United States. It consists of a cohesive collection of houses, churches, and commercial buildings dating primarily from about 1870 to 1930. They reflect the rapid growth of the town as the center of the booming Chesapeake Bay oyster industry during that period. The district encompasses much of Crisfield's main residential and commercial areas, locally known as "uptown." The Crisfield Armory is located within the district boundaries.

It was added to the National Register of Historic Places in 1990.
