= Janes Island State Park =

State park in Somerset County, Maryland

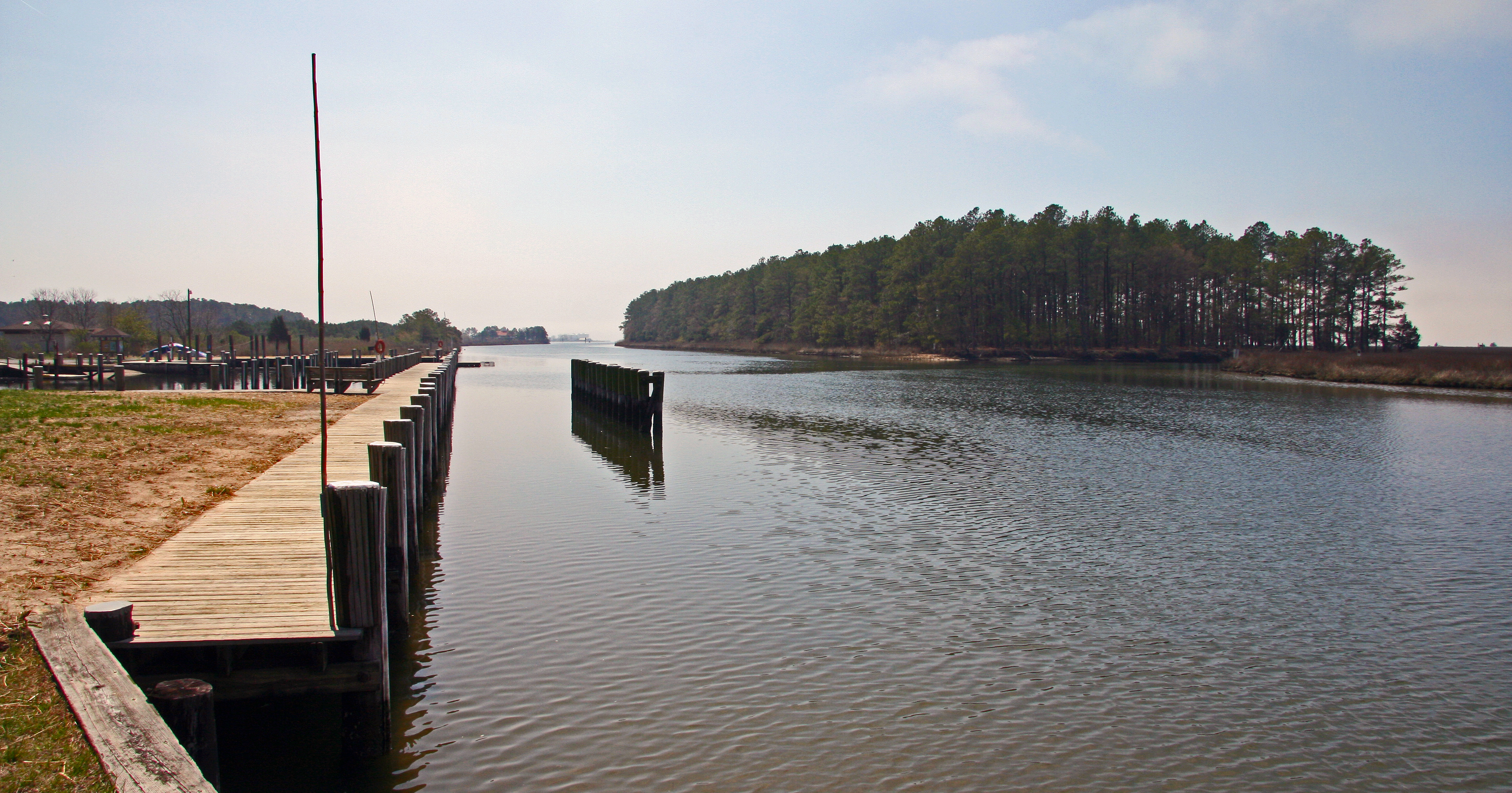

- Location within Maryland
- Location: Crisfield, Maryland, United States
- Coordinates: 38°00′10″N 75°51′43″W
- Area: 3,160 acres (1,280 ha)
- Elevation: 0 ft (0 m)
- Established: 1963
- Administrator: Maryland Department of Natural Resources
- Designation: Maryland state park
- Website: Official website

Janes Island State Park is a Maryland state park on the Chesapeake Bay lying adjacent to the city of Crisfield in Somerset County, Maryland. The park features some 30 miles (48 km) of marked water trails through the island's salt marsh leading to isolated pristine beaches. The park is managed by the Maryland Department of Natural Resources.

== History ==
Janes Island State Park was created in 1963. Between 1965 and 1978, the Maryland General Assembly authorized funding of $1,000,000 for land acquisition and site improvements including beach erosion control measures and construction of camping and picnicking facilities.

== Activities and amenities ==
The park features a conference center, campground, rental cabins, fishing and crabbing, boat launch, boat slips, and canoe and kayak rentals. Canoe trails lead to a 7-mile-long white sandy beach on Tangier Sound and the Chesapeake Bay.
