= Hopewell, Somerset County, Maryland =

Unincorporated community in Maryland, United States

Hopewell, Maryland
- Unincorporated community
- Location within Maryland Location within the United States
- Coordinates: 38°00′22″N 75°49′06″W
- Country: United States
- State: Maryland
- County: Somerset
- Elevation: 3 ft (0.91 m)
- Time zone: UTC-5 (Eastern (EST))
  - Summer (DST): UTC-4 (EDT)
- ZIP code: 21817
- Area codes: 410, 443, and 667
- GNIS feature ID: 590502

Hopewell is an unincorporated community in Somerset County, Maryland, United States. It is located at the southern intersection of Maryland routes 413 and 667. St. Peter's Methodist Episcopal Church was listed on the National Register of Historic Places in 1990.

== See also ==
- Crisfield Municipal Airport
