= Crisfield Municipal Airport =

Crisfield Somerset Municipal Airport
- IATA: none; ICAO: none; FAA LID: W41

Summary
- Airport type: Public
- Owner/Operator: Crisfield-Somerset County
- Serves: Somerset County, Maryland
- Location: Crisfield, Maryland, U.S.
- Elevation AMSL: 4 ft / 1 m
- Coordinates: 38°01′00″N 75°49′44″W

Map
- Location of airport in Maryland

Runways
Direction	Length		Surface
Direction	ft	m	Surface
06/24	3,280	1,000	Grass/earth
14/32	2,490	759	Asphalt
- Source: DAFIF

Crisfield Somerset Municipal Airport (FAA LID: W41) is a public airport located 3 miles (4.8 km) from Crisfield in Somerset County, Maryland, United States. Crisfield is located near the center of the Delmarva Peninsula in the heart of Bay Country. The Atlantic Ocean is 28 miles (45 km) to the east and the Chesapeake Bay just a few miles to the west. The Crisfield-Somerset County Airport is a joint venture of Somerset County and the City of Crisfield.

The airport averages 33 flights per week and has nine aircraft based at the field.

== See also ==
- List of airports in Maryland
