= National Register of Historic Places listings in Somerset County, Maryland =

Location of Somerset County in Maryland

This is a list of the National Register of Historic Places listings in Somerset County, Maryland.

This is intended to be a complete list of the properties and districts on the National Register of Historic Places in Somerset County, Maryland, United States. Latitude and longitude coordinates are provided for many National Register properties and districts; these locations may be seen together in a map.

There are 73 properties and districts listed on the National Register in the county.

Contents: Counties in Maryland
Allegany - Anne Arundel - Baltimore (city) - Baltimore County - Calvert - Caroline - Carroll - Cecil - Charles - Dorchester - Frederick - Garrett - Harford - Howard - Kent - Montgomery - Prince George's - Queen Anne's - Somerset - St. Mary's - Talbot - Washington - Wicomico - Worcester

This National Park Service list is complete through NPS recent listings posted May 1, 2026.

== Current listings ==
	Name on the Register	Image	Date listed	Location	City or town	Description
1	Academy Grove Historic District	Academy Grove Historic District	May 3, 1984 (#84001863)	Maryland Route 361; 38°05′58″N 75°48′32″W	Upper Fairmount	
2	Adams Farm		November 10, 1988 (#88002140)	Princess Anne-Westover Rd. 38°11′35″N 76°01′48″W	Princess Anne	
3	All Saints Church at Monie	All Saints Church at Monie	August 3, 1990 (#90001167)	Venton Rd. northwest of its junction with Deal Island Rd. 38°11′37″N 75°45′55″W	Venton	
4	Arlington		May 21, 1992 (#92000588)	Maryland Route 361; 38°07′42″N 75°44′04″W	Westover	
5	Beauchamp House		August 9, 1984 (#84003855)	Old Westover-Marion Rd. 38°05′26″N 75°42′23″W	Westover	
6	Beckford	Beckford	August 13, 1974 (#74000963)	Beckford Ave. 38°12′02″N 75°41′56″W	Princess Anne	
7	Beverly	Beverly	March 30, 1973 (#73000937)	South of Princess Anne on U.S. Route 13; 38°09′27″N 75°41′22″W	Princess Anne	
8	Brentwood Farm		September 4, 1986 (#86002174)	Allen Rd. 38°15′58″N 75°41′22″W	Westover	
9	Caldicott	Caldicott	December 22, 1983 (#83003796)	Southwest of U.S. Route 13; 38°03′13″N 75°39′02″W	Rehobeth	
10	Burton Cannon House		April 3, 1975 (#75000916)	1 mile north of Cokesbury on Dublin Rd. 38°09′04″N 75°35′40″W	Cokesbury	
11	Catalpa Farm	Catalpa Farm	November 10, 1988 (#88002049)	Old Princess Anne-Westover Rd. 38°11′09″N 75°40′46″W	Princess Anne	
12	Cedar Hill	Cedar Hill	March 14, 1991 (#91000255)	Eastern side of Sign Post Rd. at Back Creek; 38°07′55″N 75°42′42″W	Westover	
13	CLARENCE CROCKETT		May 16, 1985 (#85001079)	Lower Thorofare; 38°07′41″N 75°56′54″W	Wenona	
14	Coventry Parish Ruins	Coventry Parish Ruins	August 9, 1984 (#84001869)	Off Maryland Route 667; 38°02′18″N 75°39′59″W	Rehobeth	
15	Crisfield Armory	Crisfield Armory	September 25, 1985 (#85002669)	Main St. Extended; 38°00′29″N 75°50′34″W	Crisfield	
16	Crisfield Historic District	Crisfield Historic District	July 9, 1990 (#90001018)	Roughly bounded by Chesapeake Ave., Maryland Ave., 4th and Cove Sts., including area between Asbury Ave. and E. Main St. 37°58′53″N 75°50′57″W	Crisfield	
17	Cullen Homestead Historic District	Cullen Homestead Historic District	November 18, 2009 (#09000932)	4533, 27049, and 27067 Lawson Barnes Rd. 38°00′27″N 75°49′07″W	Crisfield	
18	Deal Island Historic District	Deal Island Historic District	September 6, 2006 (#06000780)	Deal Island Rd. from Upper Thorofare to Ballard Rd. and intersecting Sts. 38°09′38″N 75°56′49″W	Deal Island	
19	F.C. LEWIS, JR		May 16, 1985 (#85001080)	Lower Thorofare; 38°07′41″N 75°56′54″W	Wenona	
20	FANNIE L. DAUGHERTY	FANNIE L. DAUGHERTY	May 16, 1985 (#85001081)	Lower Thorofare; 38°07′41″N 75°56′54″W	Wenona	
21	Glebe House		November 18, 2009 (#09000933)	10950 Market Lane; 38°10′51″N 75°41′25″W	Princess Anne	
22	Grace Episcopal Church	Grace Episcopal Church	November 1, 1990 (#90001565)	Mt. Vernon Rd. north of its junction with Ridge Rd. 38°14′36″N 75°46′09″W	Mt. Vernon	
23	Harrington		September 11, 1975 (#75000918)	Northwest of Princess Anne off Maryland Route 362; 38°15′41″N 75°45′33″W	Princess Anne	
24	Jeptha Hayman House	Jeptha Hayman House	December 27, 1990 (#90001939)	Westover-Marion Rd. south of its junction with Charles Barnes Rd. 38°04′08″N 75°42′26″W	Kingston	
25	Hayward's Lott	Hayward's Lott	May 13, 1976 (#76001009)	1.75 miles northwest of Pocomoke City on Hayward Rd. 38°05′35″N 75°35′21″W	Pocomoke City	
26	HOWARD (Skipjack)		May 16, 1985 (#85001082)	Lower Thorofare; 38°07′41″N 75°56′54″W	Wenona	
27	IDA MAY	IDA MAY	May 16, 1985 (#85001077)	Upper Thorofare; 38°10′10″N 75°56′49″W	Chance	
28	ISLAND BELLE		March 16, 1979 (#79001141)	Ewell; 37°59′47″N 76°01′44″W	Smith Island	
29	Kingston Hall	Kingston Hall	December 31, 1974 (#74000962)	Western side of Maryland Route 667, 0.5 miles from Kingston; 38°05′11″N 75°43′08″W	Kingston	
30	Lankford House		August 9, 1984 (#84001870)	Maryland Route 667; 38°03′04″N 75°42′21″W	Marion	
31	Liberty Hall		December 27, 1976 (#76001012)	South of Westover off Maryland Route 361; 38°05′35″N 75°43′48″W	Westover	
32	George Maddox Farm		September 17, 1985 (#85002410)	River Rd. 38°05′59″N 75°45′05″W	Manokin	
33	Maddux House		December 27, 2002 (#02001574)	9084 Maddox Island Rd. 38°07′59″N 75°47′44″W	Upper Fairmount	
34	Make Peace	Make Peace	November 20, 1975 (#75000917)	1.5 miles southeast of Crisfield on Johnson's Creek Rd. 37°58′25″N 75°49′13″W	Crisfield	
35	Manokin Historic District	Manokin Historic District	June 29, 1976 (#76001010)	Southwest of Princess Anne at the Manokin River; 38°09′16″N 75°47′22″W	Princess Anne	
36	Manokin Presbyterian Church	Manokin Presbyterian Church	November 21, 1976 (#76001011)	N. Somerset Ave. 38°12′27″N 75°41′43″W	Princess Anne	
37	Mt. Zion Memorial Church	Mt. Zion Memorial Church	November 1, 2007 (#07001116)	29071 Polks Rd. 38°15′37″N 75°44′38″W	Princess Anne	
38	Nelson Homestead	Nelson Homestead	September 12, 1985 (#85002175)	Cash Corner and Hopewell-Bedsworth Rds. 37°59′29″N 75°49′38″W	Crisfield	
39	Panther's Den		March 22, 1984 (#84001872)	Drawbridge Rd. 38°12′12″N 75°47′25″W	Venton	
40	Pomfret Plantation		September 7, 1984 (#84001874)	Maryland Route 667; 38°02′31″N 75°48′06″W	Marion Station	
41	Princess Anne Historic District	Princess Anne Historic District	October 14, 1980 (#80001834)	Off Maryland Route 413; 38°12′14″N 75°41′38″W	Princess Anne	
42	Dr. William B. Pritchard House		August 8, 1996 (#96000879)	29994 Polks Rd. 38°15′49″N 75°42′36″W	Princess Anne	
43	Puncheon Mill House	Puncheon Mill House	July 27, 1994 (#94000763)	Puncheon Landing Rd. 38°04′35″N 75°36′26″W	Pocomoke City	
44	Quindocqua United Methodist Church	Quindocqua United Methodist Church	March 28, 1996 (#96000313)	Junction of Quindocqua, Whittington, and L.Q. Powell Rds. 38°01′02″N 75°44′58″W	Marion Station	
45	Rehobeth Presbyterian Church	Rehobeth Presbyterian Church	November 5, 1974 (#74000964)	South of Rehobeth off Maryland Route 667; 38°02′21″N 75°39′53″W	Rehobeth	
46	Reward		August 13, 1974 (#74000965)	Southeast of Shelltown on Williams Point Rd. 37°57′24″N 75°39′26″W	Shelltown	
47	Rock Creek Methodist Episcopal Church		November 2, 1990 (#90001718)	Deal Island Rd. northeast of Scotts Cove; 38°10′35″N 75°56′12″W	Chance	
48	Salisbury Plantation		June 20, 1975 (#75000919)	Southwest of Westover off Maryland Route 361; 38°05′18″N 75°44′13″W	Westover	
49	Schoolridge Farm		September 7, 1984 (#84001876)	Maryland Route 361; 38°05′53″N 75°48′19″W	Upper Fairmount	
50	SEA GULL		May 16, 1985 (#85001078)	Lower thorofare 38°07′41″N 75°56′54″W	Deal Island	
51	William S. Smith House		July 9, 1991 (#91000891)	Southern side of Oriole Rd., east of its junction with Crab Island Rd. 38°10′22″N 75°48′56″W	Oriole	
52	Somerset Academy Archaeological Site	Somerset Academy Archaeological Site	September 11, 1986 (#86002356)	Address Restricted	Princess Anne	
53	St. John's Methodist Episcopal Church and Joshua Thomas Chapel		November 1, 1990 (#90001550)	Deal Island Rd. north of its junction with Tangier Rd. 38°09′19″N 75°56′50″W	Deal Island	
54	St. Mark's Episcopal Church	St. Mark's Episcopal Church	October 25, 1990 (#90001569)	Junction of Westover-Marion and Charles Barnes Rds. 38°04′21″N 75°42′35″W	Kingston	
55	St. Paul's Methodist Episcopal Church	St. Paul's Methodist Episcopal Church	April 12, 1996 (#96000403)	Junction of Maryland Route 413 and Sign Rd. 38°07′23″N 75°42′26″W	Westover	
56	St. Paul's Protestant Episcopal Church	St. Paul's Protestant Episcopal Church	August 3, 1990 (#90001153)	Near the junction of Farm Market Rd. and St. Pauls Church Rd. 38°00′56″N 75°46′14″W	Tulls Corner	
57	St. Peter's Methodist Episcopal Church	St. Peter's Methodist Episcopal Church	November 2, 1990 (#90001721)	Junction of Old Crisfield-Marion Rd. and Heart's Ease Rd. 38°01′01″N 75°49′13″W	Hopewell	
58	Sudler's Conclusion	Sudler's Conclusion	August 28, 1973 (#73000936)	Northwest of Manokin off Maryland Route 361; 38°07′16″N 75°46′37″W	Manokin	
59	SUSAN MAY		May 16, 1985 (#85001083)	Lower Thorofare; 38°07′41″N 75°56′54″W	Wenona	
60	Capt. Leonard Tawes House	Capt. Leonard Tawes House	April 5, 1990 (#90000598)	Somerset Ave. 37°58′32″N 75°50′43″W	Crisfield	
61	Teackle Mansion	Teackle Mansion	October 26, 1971 (#71000378)	Mansion St. 38°12′12″N 75°42′08″W	Princess Anne	
62	THOMAS W. CLYDE	THOMAS W. CLYDE	May 16, 1985 (#85001084)	Lower Thorofare; 38°07′41″N 75°56′54″W	Wenona	
63	Tudor Hall		December 19, 1974 (#74000966)	Southeast of Upper Fairmount off Maryland Route 361; 38°05′52″N 75°46′31″W	Upper Fairmount	
64	William T. Tull House	William T. Tull House	March 26, 1996 (#96000302)	Along the western side of Maryland Route 413; 38°07′32″N 75°42′22″W	Westover	
65	University of Maryland Eastern Shore	University of Maryland Eastern Shore	September 16, 2005 (#05001021)	1 Backbone Rd. 38°12′29″N 75°41′09″W	Princess Anne	
66	Upper Fairmount Historic District	Upper Fairmount Historic District	September 13, 1993 (#93000900)	Both sides of Maryland Route 361; 38°06′25″N 75°48′01″W	Upper Fairmount	
67	Waddy House		November 3, 1988 (#88002221)	Perryhawkin Rd. 38°11′37″N 75°38′54″W	Princess Anne	
68	Ward Brothers' House and Shop	Ward Brothers' House and Shop	November 21, 1997 (#94000790)	3199 Sackertown Rd. 37°58′13″N 75°50′42″W	Crisfield	
69	Waterloo	Waterloo	February 13, 1986 (#86000257)	Mt. Vernon Rd. 38°13′35″N 75°45′09″W	Princess Anne	
70	Waters' River		August 9, 1984 (#84001882)	Hood Rd. 38°05′54″N 75°45′50″W	Manokin	
71	Watkins Point Farm	Watkins Point Farm	December 27, 2002 (#02001586)	27737 Phoenix Church Rd. 37°58′51″N 75°47′28″W	Marion Station	
72	White Hall	White Hall	June 7, 1984 (#84003868)	Cooley Rd. 38°15′59″N 75°43′23″W	Princess Anne	
73	Williams' Conquest		May 3, 1984 (#84001886)	Charles Cannon Rd. 38°04′23″N 75°45′43″W	Marion Station	

== Former listings ==
	Name on the Register	Image	Date listed	Date removed	Location	City or town	Description
1	William Costen House		March 28, 1985 (#85000654)	July 25, 1994	Courthouse Hill Road	Wellington vicinity	Burned down as a fire fighter training exercise.

== See also ==
- List of National Historic Landmarks in Maryland
- National Register of Historic Places listings in Maryland
