= Cokesbury (disambiguation) =

Cokesbury is the official retail division of the United Methodist Publishing house.

Cokesbury may also refer to:

== Locations ==
- Cokesbury, Maryland
- Cokesbury, New Jersey
- Cokesbury, North Carolina
- Cokesbury, South Carolina

== Institutions ==
- Cokesbury Church, located in Virginia
- Cokesbury College, defunct college in Maryland
