= Bypass Road =

Bypass Road may refer to:

- Bypass Road (film), a 2019 Indian Hindi-language film
- Maryland Route 359, a road near Pocomoke City, Maryland
- Kentucky Route 1958, a bypass route around Winchester, Kentucky

== See also ==
- Bypass (road)
