= F. C. Lewis Jr. (skipjack) =

- U.S. National Register of Historic Places
- Location within Maryland Location within the United States
- Location: Lower Thorofare, Wenona, Maryland
- Coordinates: 38°7′41″N 75°56′54″W
- Area: less than one acre
- Built: 1907
- Architectural style: Skipjack
- MPS: Chesapeake Bay Skipjack Fleet TR
- NRHP reference No.: 85001080
- Added to NRHP: May 16, 1985

The F. C. Lewis Jr. is a Chesapeake Bay skipjack, built in 1907 at Hopkins, Virginia. She is a 39-foot-long (12 m) two-sail bateau, or "V"-bottomed deadrise type of centerboard sloop. She has a beam of 14.6 feet (4.5 m) and a register depth of 3 feet (0.91 m); her register tonnage is 6. Likewise, she is one of the 35 surviving traditional Chesapeake Bay skipjacks and a member of the last commercial sailing fleet in the United States. She is located at Wenona, Somerset County, Maryland.

She was listed on the National Register of Historic Places in 1985. She is assigned Maryland dredge number 36.
