= Arlington (Westover, Maryland) =

Historic house in Maryland

- U.S. National Register of Historic Places
- Location within Maryland Location within the United States
- Location: Maryland Route 361, Westover, Maryland
- Coordinates: 38°7′42″N 75°44′4″W
- Area: 3 acres (1.2 ha)
- Built: 1750
- Architectural style: Georgian
- NRHP reference No.: 92000588
- Added to NRHP: May 21, 1992

Arlington is a historic home located at Westover, Somerset County, Maryland, and is located at the end of James Ring Road on Maryland Route 361. It is a prominent mid-18th-century Flemish bond brick dwelling. It was built around 1750 by Ephraim Wilson, the two-story, center hall, single-pile house is highlighted by glazed checkerboard brick patterns on each wall. It features a Federal period porch enriched with a cornice of paired modillion blocks and original engaged Tuscan columns against the back wall.

It was listed on the National Register of Historic Places in 1992.
