= Kingston Hall =

Historic house in Maryland, United States

- U.S. National Register of Historic Places
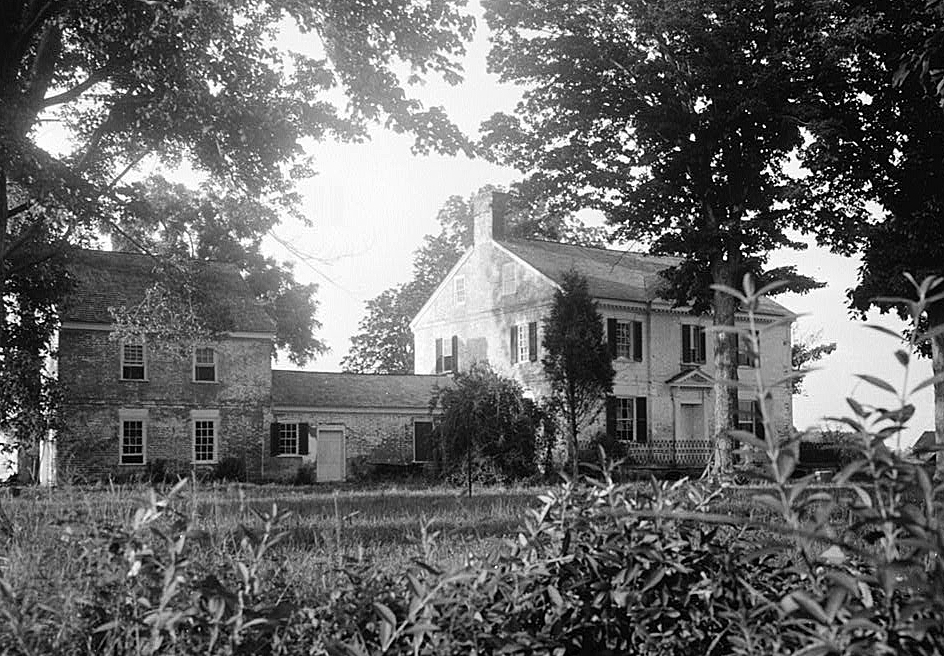

- Location within Maryland Location within the United States
- Location: W side of MD 667, 0.5 mi. from Kingston, Kingston, Maryland
- Coordinates: 38°5′11″N 75°43′8″W
- Area: 80 acres (32 ha)
- Built: 1755
- Architectural style: Georgian
- NRHP reference No.: 74000962
- Added to NRHP: December 31, 1974

Kingston Hall is a historic home located at Kingston, Somerset County, Maryland. Located along the Big Annemessex River, it is a Georgian style dwelling of two stories plus an attic, three bays wide by two deep, connected by a one-story brick hyphen to a two-story-plus-loft brick kitchen wing. Also on the property is the brick, circular ice house. The interior of the house features corner fireplaces. Interior woodwork mouldings are in a transitional style, bridging late Georgian and Federal styles.

== History ==
The house was built by Thomas King on an 860-acre (350 ha) parcel of King family land named "Conclusion." Work began in 1755. At the time the property included the house, the two-story brick kitchen wing, a dairy, a blacksmith shop. a granary, two barns, a "negro house", a stable, a carriage house, a corn house, three log houses and a smoke house. After King's death, his daughter and son-in-law Henry James Carroll resided at Kingston Hall. Their son Thomas King Carroll (1793-1873) was born there and inherited the property. Thomas was briefly governor of Maryland 1830–31. Thomas's daughter Anna Ella Carroll (1815-1894), an advisor to Abraham Lincoln during the American Civil War, was born there.

Thomas King Carroll's accumulated debts forced the sale of the property in 1835. The new owner was John Upshur Dennis, whose family was also politically well-connected. Dennis's son George Robertson Dennis served in the United States Senate and three relatives were U.S. Representatives in Congress.

Kingston Hall was listed on the National Register of Historic Places in 1974.

== See also ==
- Beverly (Princess Anne, Maryland), another King family home in Somerset County
