= Fairmount, Maryland =

- CDP
- Coordinates: 38°5′40″N 75°47′25″W
- Country: United States
- State: Maryland
- County: Somerset

Area
  - Total: 17.12 sq mi (44.33 km^{2})
  - Land: 12.26 sq mi (31.75 km^{2})
  - Water: 4.86 sq mi (12.58 km^{2})
- Elevation: 3.3 ft (1 m)

Population (2020)
  - Total: 408
  - Density: 33.3/sq mi (12.85/km^{2})
- Time zone: UTC−5 (Eastern (EST))
  - Summer (DST): UTC−4 (EDT)
- ZIP code: 21867
- Area codes: 410, 443, and 667
- FIPS code: 24-27375
- GNIS feature ID: 0590184

Fairmount is a census-designated place (CDP) in Somerset County, Maryland, United States. The population was 537 at the 2000 census. It is included in the Salisbury, Maryland-Delaware Metropolitan Statistical Area.

== Geography ==
Fairmount is located at 38°5′40″N 75°47′25″W (38.094554, −75.790342).

According to the United States Census Bureau, the CDP has a total area of 17.2 square miles (45 km^{2}), of which 12.6 square miles (33 km^{2}) is land and 4.5 square miles (12 km^{2}) (26.34%) is water.

== Demographics ==
Historical population
Census	Pop.	Note	%±
2000	537		—
2020	408		—
U.S. Decennial Census

As of the census of 2000, there were 537 people, 206 households, and 140 families residing in the CDP. The population density was 42.5 inhabitants per square mile (16.4/km^{2}). There were 275 housing units at an average density of 21.7 per square mile (8.4/km^{2}). The racial makeup of the CDP was 65.36% White, 32.22% African American, 0.19% Native American, 0.56% Asian, 1.12% from other races, and 0.56% from two or more races. Hispanic or Latino of any race were 1.12% of the population.

There were 206 households, out of which 27.7% had children under the age of 18 living with them, 51.5% were married couples living together, 9.7% had a female householder with no husband present, and 32.0% were non-families. 27.7% of all households were made up of individuals, and 15.0% had someone living alone who was 65 years of age or older. The average household size was 2.61 and the average family size was 3.13.

In the CDP, the population was spread out, with 27.4% under the age of 18, 5.4% from 18 to 24, 26.4% from 25 to 44, 24.6% from 45 to 64, and 16.2% who were 65 years of age or older. The median age was 38 years. For every 100 females, there were 91.8 males. For every 100 females age 18 and over, there were 97.0 males.

The median income for a household in the CDP was $24,185, and the median income for a family was $38,542. Males had a median income of $26,146 versus $21,786 for females. The per capita income for the CDP was $18,494. About 20.8% of families and 22.5% of the population were below the poverty line, including 33.0% of those under age 18 and 23.6% of those age 65 or over.

== Transportation ==
Fairmount is located on Maryland Route 361: Fairmount Road. The state designation for the road ends in the CDP, near Fairmount Volunteer Fire Department. The road leads back to Maryland Route 413 in Westover.

Shore Transit once provided access to the CDP from a transfer point in Westover, but service ended in the early 2000s.
