= Glebe House (Princess Anne, Maryland) =

Historic house in Maryland, United States

- U.S. National Register of Historic Places
- Location within Maryland Location within the United States
- Location: 10950 Market Lane, Princess Anne, Maryland
- Coordinates: 38°10′52″N 75°41′33″W
- Area: 1 acre (0.40 ha)
- Built: 1784
- Built by: Bowland, William
- Architectural style: Georgian
- NRHP reference No.: 09000933
- Added to NRHP: November 18, 2009

The Glebe House, also known as Davis's Choice, Turner's Purchase, and incorrectly as the Samuel Chase House, is a historic house at 10950 Market Lane in Princess Anne, Maryland. The 1 1/2-story house was built in 1784 and is a rare instance of an 18th-century brick-ender, a building form that was once common on the Eastern Shore of Maryland. The house has three wood-frame walls, and the fourth is of brick laid in Flemish bond with a projecting water table. The house was substantially altered in the 1920s when its roof was raised and a second story was added, but this work was undone when the house underwent restoration around the turn of the 21st century. It was long thought to be of greater age, and the childhood home or birthplace of Samuel Chase, a signer of the United States Declaration of Independence, but documentary research has shown these connections to be incorrect.

The house was listed on the National Register of Historic Places in 2009.

== See also ==
- National Register of Historic Places listings in Somerset County, Maryland
