= Maryland Route 758 =

State highway in Maryland, United States

Maryland Route 758
- Corporate Center Drive

Route information
- Maintained by MDSHA
- Length: 1.02 mi (1.64 km)
- Existed: 2012–present

Major junctions
- South end: Stoney Run Road / New Ridge Road in Hanover
- North end: Ridge Road in Hanover

Location
- Country: United States
- State: Maryland
- Counties: Anne Arundel

Highway system
- Maryland highway system; Interstate; US; State; Scenic Byways
| ← MD 756 | → MD 759 |

Maryland Route 758 is a state highway located in Hanover in Anne Arundel County, Maryland. The route runs 1.02 miles (1.64 km) from an intersection with Stoney Run Road and New Ridge Road north to a roundabout at Ridge Road. The road provides access to the Maryland Department of Transportation headquarters building. The state took over maintenance of Corporate Center Drive in 2012.

== Route description ==
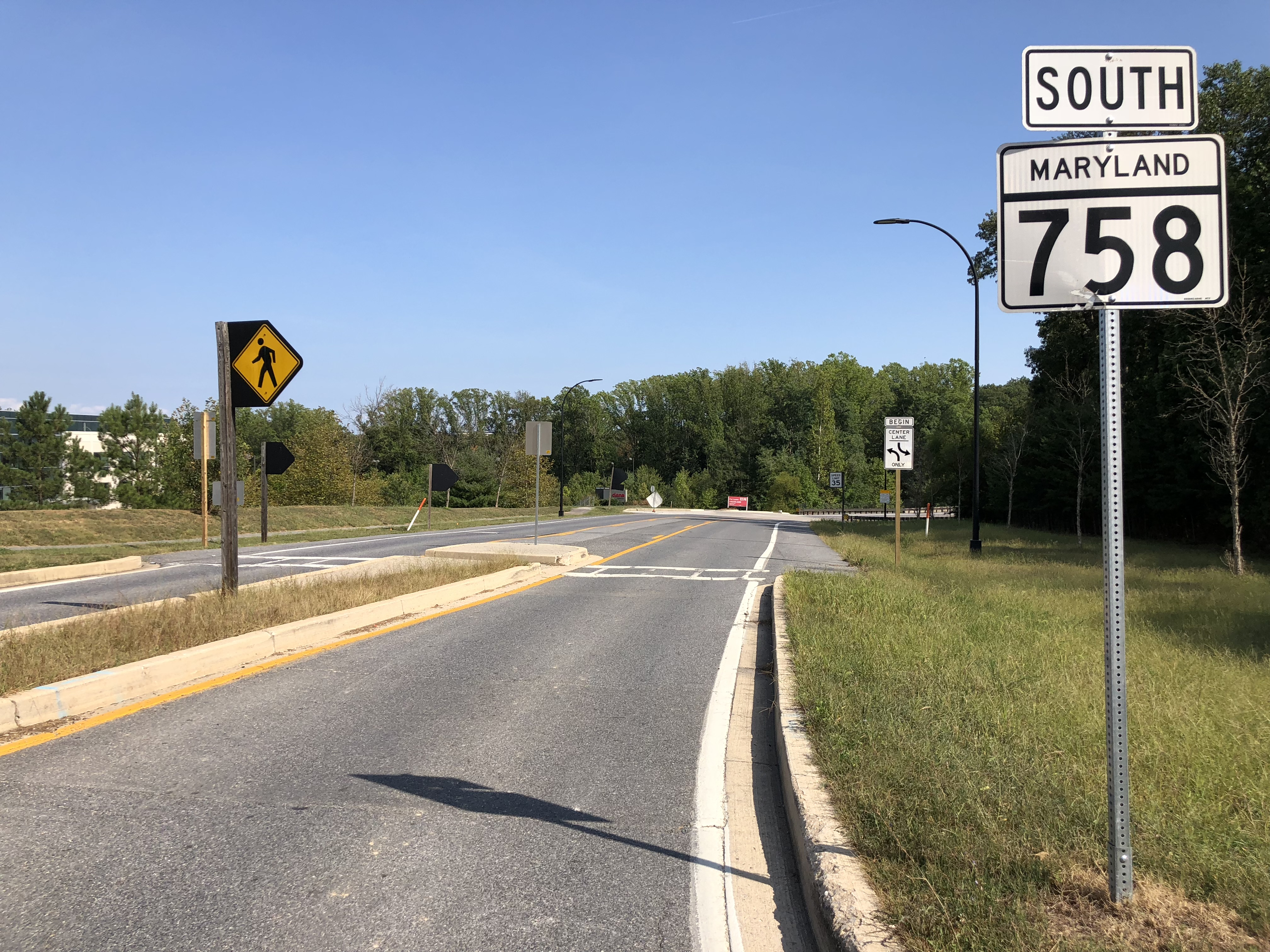
View south from the north end of MD 758 at Ridge Road in Ehrmansville

MD 758 begins at an intersection with Stoney Run Road and New Ridge Road in Hanover, Anne Arundel County a short distance to the west of Baltimore–Washington International Airport. From here, the route heads northeast on Corporate Center Drive, a four-lane divided highway. The road passes through wooded areas, becoming a three-lane road with a center left-turn lane and curving to the north. MD 758 turns northwest and passes by the Maryland Department of Transportation headquarters. The route passes by an office building before it reaches its northern terminus at a roundabout with Ridge Road.

== History ==
MD 758 was assigned to Corporate Center Drive in 2012 when the state took over maintenance of the road following a donation.

== Junction list ==
The entire route is in Hanover, Anne Arundel County.

| mi | km | Destinations | Notes |
|---|---|---|---|
| 0.00 | 0.00 | Stoney Run Road / New Ridge Road south | Southern terminus |
| 1.02 | 1.64 | Ridge Road | Roundabout; northern terminus |
1.000 mi = 1.609 km; 1.000 km = 0.621 mi
