= Maryland Route 756 =

State highway in Maryland, United States

Maryland Route 756
- Old Snow Hill Road
- Maryland Route 756 highlighted in red

Route information
- Maintained by MDSHA
- Length: 1.17 mi (1.88 km)
- Existed: 1946–present

Major junctions
- South end: US 13 in Pocomoke City
- MD 359 near Pocomoke City
- North end: US 113 near Pocomoke City

Location
- Country: United States
- State: Maryland
- Counties: Worcester

Highway system
- Maryland highway system; Interstate; US; State; Scenic Byways
| ← MD 755 | → MD 758 |

Maryland Route 756 (MD 756) is a state highway in the U.S. state of Maryland. Known as Old Snow Hill Road, the state highway runs 1.17 miles (1.88 km) from U.S. Route 13 (US 13) east to US 113 within Pocomoke City. MD 756 is the original alignment of US 113 in Pocomoke City. That original alignment was bypassed by what is now MD 359 in the mid-1930s.

== Route description ==
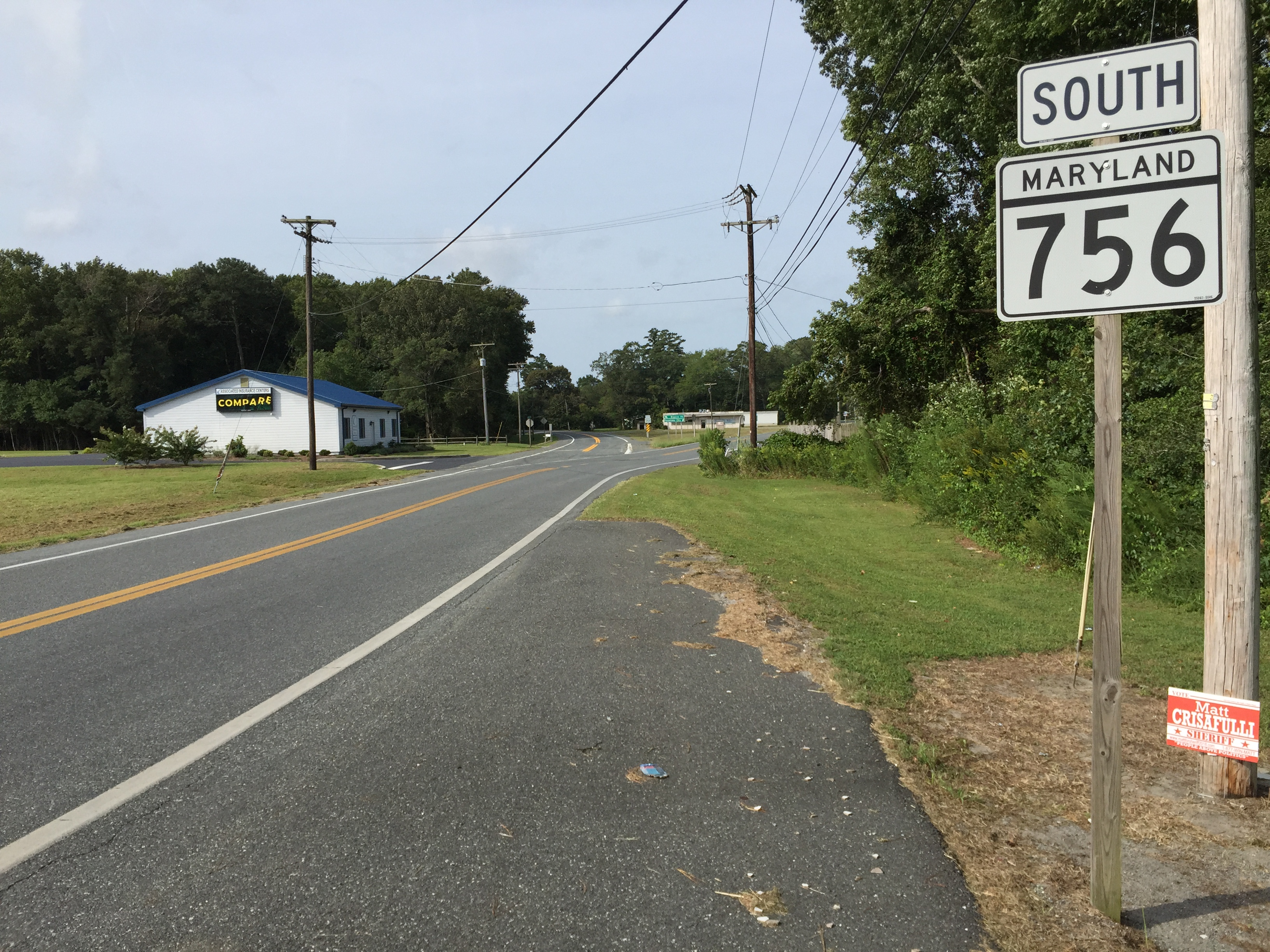
View south along MD 756 at US 113 near Pocomoke City

MD 756 begins at an intersection with US 13 (Ocean Highway) in the middle of a commercial area on the eastern edge of incorporated Pocomoke City. Linden Avenue, which was formerly part of MD 756, heads west toward the central business district. MD 756 heads east as a two-lane undivided road past the commercial area and crosses Town Branch. From there, the state highway turns northeast through a mix of farms and residences. After meeting the northern end of MD 359 (Bypass Road) at an oblique angle, MD 756 reaches its northern terminus at US 113 (Worcester Highway).

== History ==
MD 756 follows the original alignment of US 113 through Pocomoke City. US 113's first bypass of Pocomoke City, which is now MD 359 and MD 250A, was completed in 1936. The state highway was signed as MD 756 by 1946. The state highway once continued west to US 13 Business along Linden Avenue and Sixth Street. MD 756 was rolled back to US 13 by 1999.

== Junction list ==
The entire route is in Pocomoke City, Worcester County.

| mi | km | Destinations | Notes |
|---|---|---|---|
| 0.00 | 0.00 | US 13 (Ocean Highway) / Linden Avenue west – Salisbury, Norfolk | Southern terminus |
| 1.07 | 1.72 | MD 359 south (Bypass Road) | Northern terminus of MD 359 |
| 1.17 | 1.88 | US 113 (Worcester Highway) – Snow Hill, Ocean City | Northern terminus |
1.000 mi = 1.609 km; 1.000 km = 0.621 mi
