= Waters' River =

Historic house in Maryland, United States

- U.S. National Register of Historic Places
- Location within Maryland Location within the United States
- Location: Hood Road, Manokin, Maryland
- Coordinates: 38°5′54″N 75°45′50″W
- Area: 142 acres (57 ha)
- Built: 1800
- Architectural style: Federal
- NRHP reference No.: 84001882
- Added to NRHP: August 9, 1984

Waters' River, also known as the Robertson Farm, is a historic home located at Manokin, Somerset County, Maryland, United States. It is a large plantation house constructed between 1800 and 1820 on the Big Annemessex River. It is a two-story, Flemish bond brick house with a steeply pitched gable roof. The interior features a great deal of Federal period detail including the stair and balustrade; mantels; paneled doors and reveals; and baseboard, chair rail, and architrave moldings.

Waters' River was listed on the National Register of Historic Places in 1984.
