= Beverly (Princess Anne, Maryland) =

Historic house in Maryland

- U.S. National Register of Historic Places
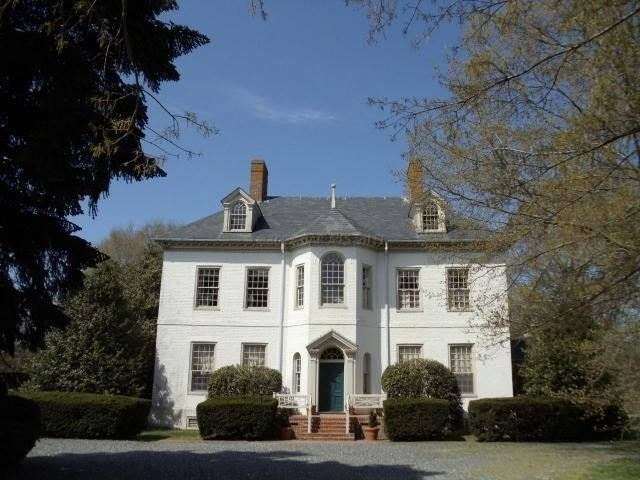

- Location within Maryland Location within the United States
- Location: Perry Road, Princess Anne, Maryland
- Coordinates: 38°9′27″N 75°41′22″W
- Area: 212.4 acres (86.0 ha)
- Built: 1785
- Built by: King II, Nehemiah
- Architectural style: Federal
- NRHP reference No.: 73000937
- Added to NRHP: March 30, 1973

Beverly is a historic home located at Princess Anne, Somerset County, Maryland, United States. It is a 2 1/2-story, Federal-style, Flemish bond brick dwelling measuring 40 feet by 60 feet. It was built by Nehemiah King II between 1785 and 1796. The interior of the house was partially destroyed by fire in 1937 but was restored from plans.

The house was listed on the National Register of Historic Places in 1973.

== Napoleon rescue plot ==
King became a friend of Jérôme Bonaparte through his marriage in 1803 to Betsy Patterson of Baltimore. The home was included in a plot to rescue Napoleon from exile on St. Helena Island, when plans were made for the Emperor to be transported up the Chesapeake Bay and into the Manokin River, where he was to arrive at Beverly through a tunnel leading under the house from the nearby creek. Napoleon died before the rescue was attempted.

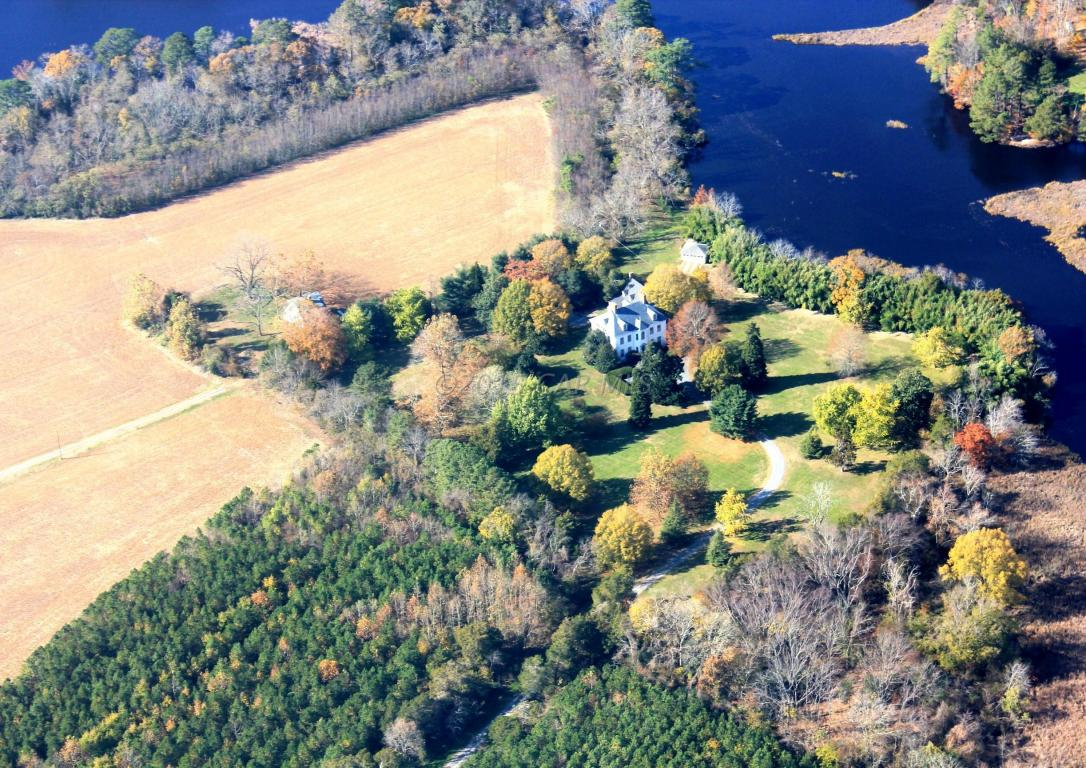
Aerial view

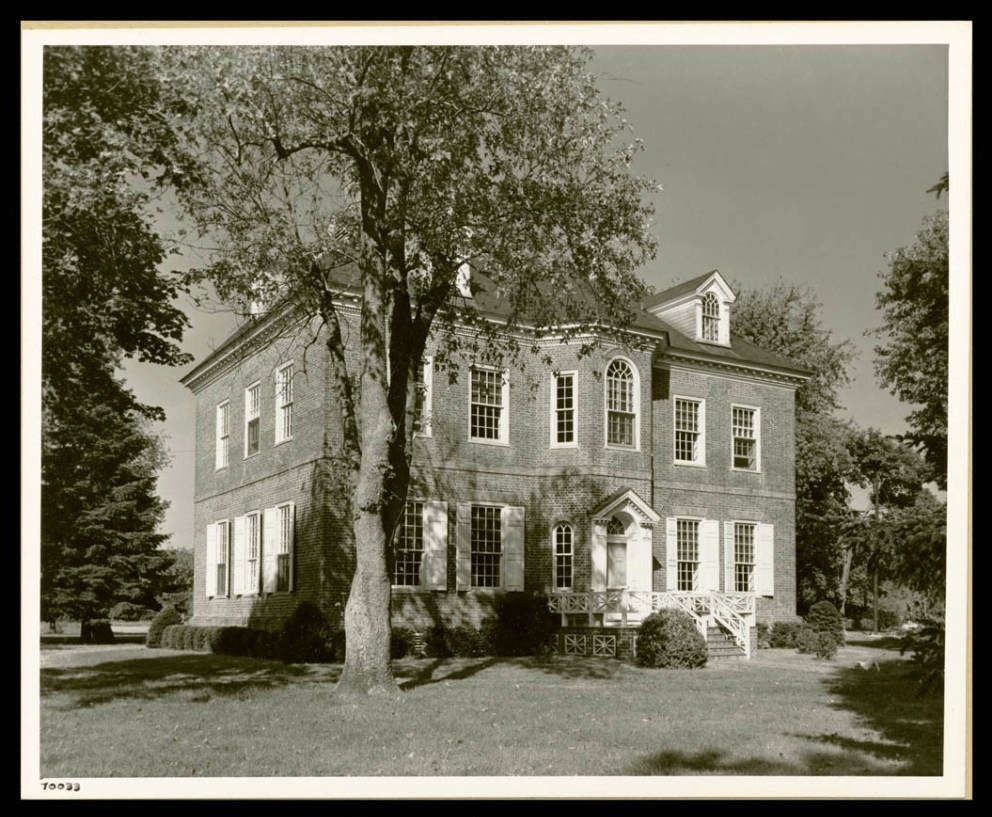
1940s

== See also ==
- Kingston Hall, another King family house in Somerset County
