= Ida May (skipjack) =

- U.S. National Register of Historic Places
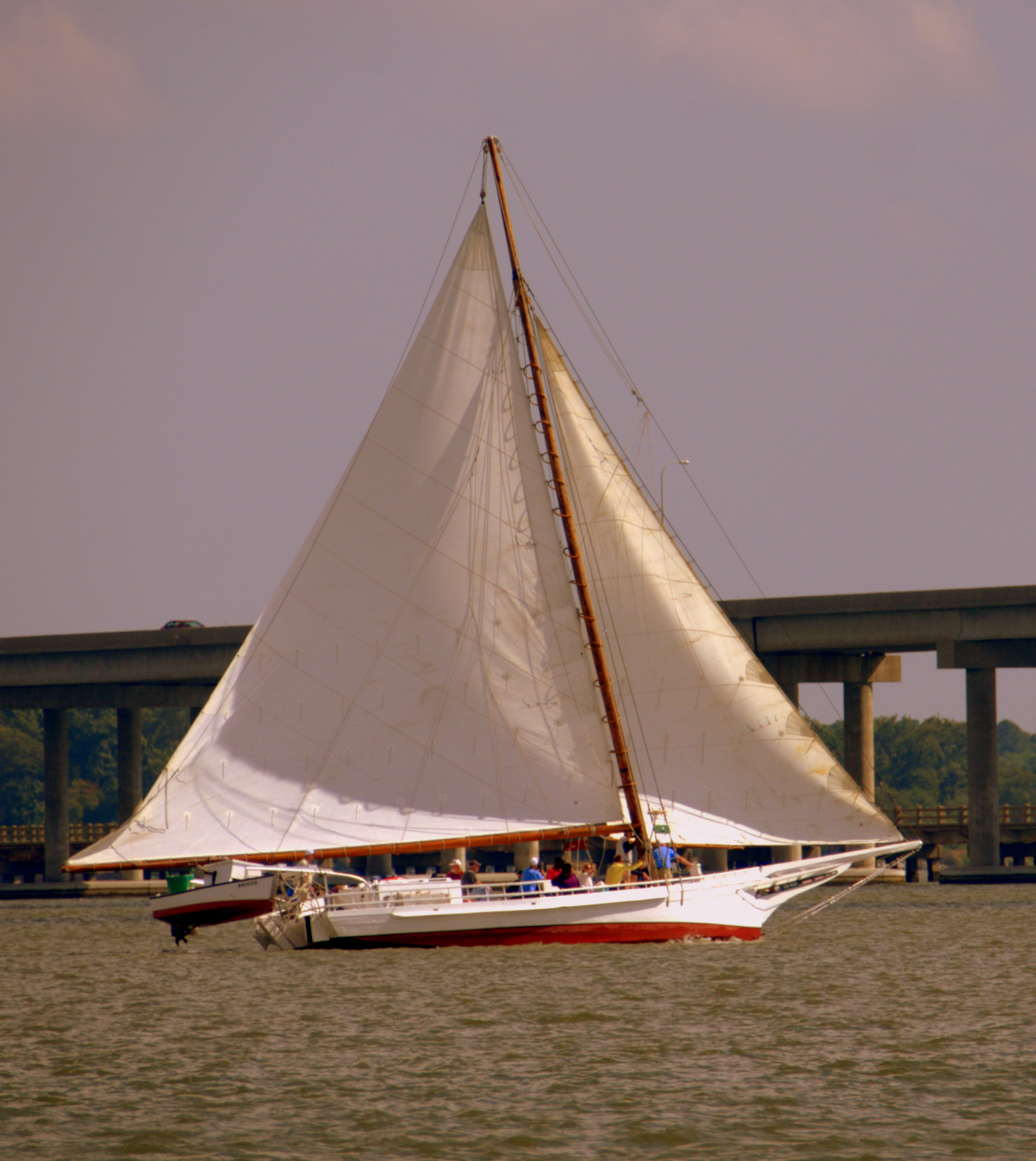
- The Ida May in 2013

- Location within Maryland Location within the United States
- Location: Upper thorofare, Chance, Maryland
- Coordinates: 38°10′10″N 75°56′49″W
- Built: 1906
- Architectural style: Skipjack
- Website: idamayskipjack.ning.com
- MPS: Chesapeake Bay Skipjack Fleet TR
- NRHP reference No.: 85001077
- Added to NRHP: May 16, 1985

The Ida May is a Chesapeake Bay skipjack, built in 1906 at Urbanna or Deep Creek, Virginia. She is a 42.2-foot-long (12.9 m), two-sail bateau, or "V"-bottomed deadrise type of centerboard sloop. She has a beam of 14.4 feet (4.4 m), a depth of 3.3 feet (1 m), and a net register tonnage of 7. She is one of the 35 surviving traditional Chesapeake Bay skipjacks and a member of the last commercial sailing fleet in the United States. She is located at Chance, Somerset County, Maryland.

She was listed on the National Register of Historic Places in 1985. She is assigned Maryland dredge number 41.

== Early history ==
Ida May was constructed in 1906, but details of her early years are scarce. In 1929, she was captained by R. W. W. Parks and was based in Wingate, Maryland. By the early 1950s, the boat was brought to Chance, Maryland, by Melvin Beauchamp and Melvin "Fish" Bivens.

== Ownership by Elbert Gladden Sr. ==
Elbert Gladden Sr., also known as "Ebb Tide," acquired Ida May in 1954, although some sources suggest the purchase occurred as late as 1968. Upon acquisition, the boat was reportedly in excellent condition following a significant rebuild. Her first major restoration took place at Krentz Shipyard in Harryhogan, Virginia, around 1955. During this period, she received a new Georgia pine mast from the ram Levin J. Marvil, which had sunk during Hurricane Connie. Gladden also purchased two masts from the ram, one for Ida May and one for Mamie A. Mister, another skipjack he owned.

== Gladden’s Fleet and Operations ==
Elbert Gladden was a prominent figure in the skipjack community, owning a total of twelve skipjacks, as well as a bugeye and other workboats. His fleet operated out of various locations, including Annapolis, Kent Island, Cambridge, and Deal Island, with Ida May primarily associated with Deal Island. Notable captains of Ida May included Orville Parks, Mervin Christy, and Clyde Webster, among others.

== Mid-Late 20th Century ==
In the mid-1970s, Gladden considered selling Ida May but ultimately decided to keep her. By 1985, she was listed on the National Register of Historic Places. Despite a decline in oyster harvests and declining health, Gladden continued to maintain the vessel until his death in August 1992. The boat was inherited by his sons, Gordon and Elbert Jr.

In 1990, the Ida May was temporarily removed from Scott's Cove and underwent repairs in Crisfield and Salisbury. A significant restoration was completed in 1991-92, with the work described as "purely an act of love." However, by 1999, the vessel required further repairs, which extended into 2006. The extensive rebuilds included replacing the bottom, keel, sides, stem, and sampson post. The vessel was again reconstructed in 2011 and 2021.

=== Recent Years ===
Ida May has been primarily a family boat, serving educational and display purposes. A documentary titled "The Ida May Project" chronicled her 2011 restoration and has been featured at various museums. The boat has also been a subject of artistic interest and appeared on the cover of the 1992 annual report for the First National Bank of Maryland.

The skipjack has been notable for its racing achievements. Under the helm of Shawn Ridgley, Ida May won the Deal Island and Cambridge races multiple times from 2017 to 2023. The vessel continues to be a symbol of maritime heritage and a testament to the Gladden family's dedication.
