= Burton Cannon House =

Historic house in Maryland, United States

- U.S. National Register of Historic Places
- Location within Maryland Location within the United States
- Location: Dublin Road, Cokesbury, Maryland
- Coordinates: 38°9′4″N 75°35′40″W
- Area: 54 acres (22 ha)
- Built: 1797
- NRHP reference No.: 75000916
- Added to NRHP: April 3, 1975

Burton Cannon House, also known as Windsor, is a historic home located at Cokesbury, Somerset County, Maryland. It is a 1 1/2-story frame dwelling, four bays wide and two bays deep.. It was built in the late 1790s.

It was listed on the National Register of Historic Places in 1975.
