= White Hall (Princess Anne, Maryland) =

Historic house in Maryland, United States

- U.S. National Register of Historic Places
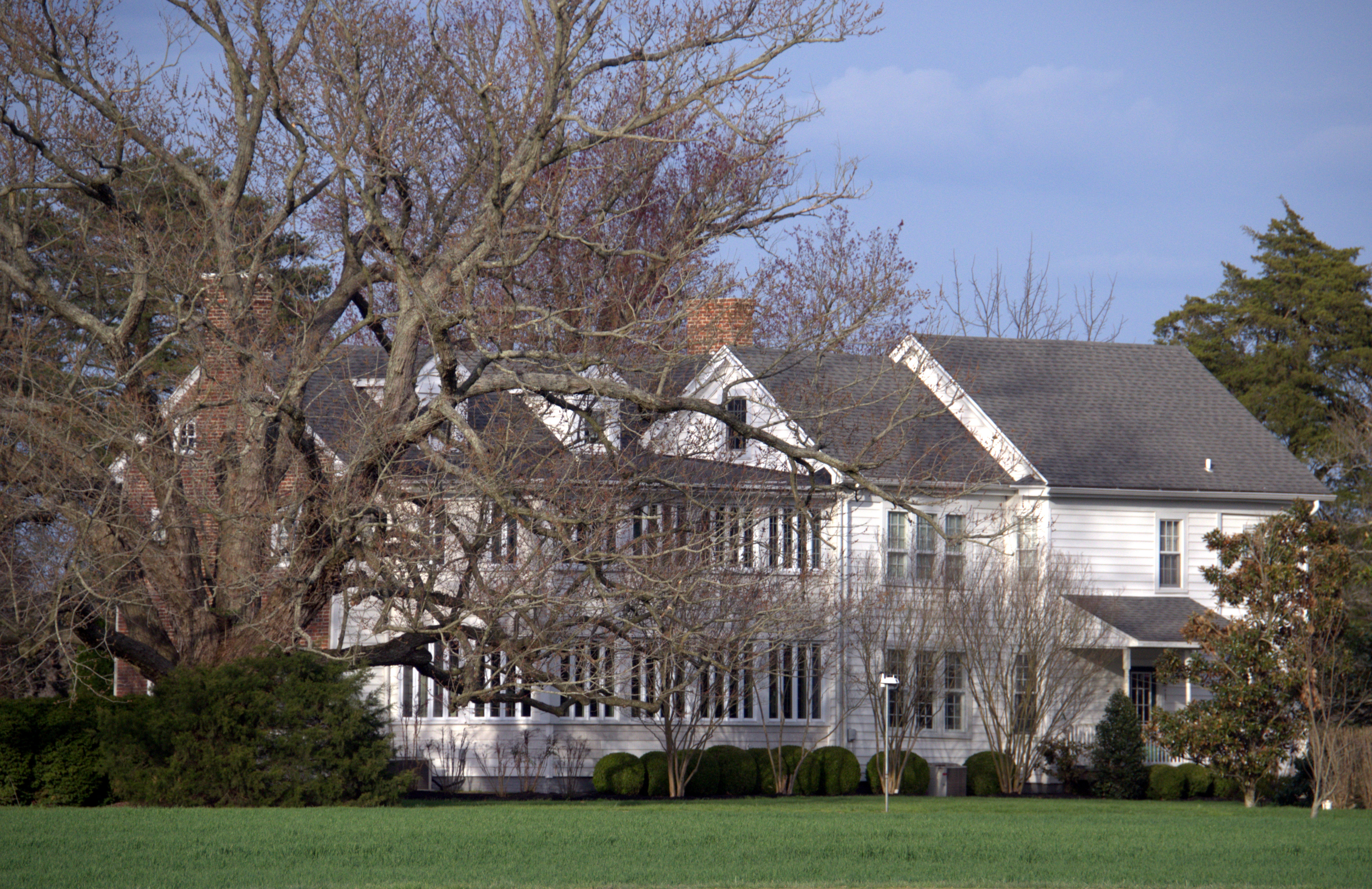

- Location within Maryland Location within the United States
- Location: Cooley Road; Princess Anne, Maryland
- Coordinates: 38°15′59″N 75°43′23″W
- Area: 10 acres (4.0 ha)
- Built: 1792
- NRHP reference No.: 84003868
- Added to NRHP: June 7, 1984

White Hall is a historic home located at Princess Anne, Somerset County, Maryland, United States. It is a 2 1/2-story, ell shaped frame house constructed about 1785–1798. The house features a rare mid-19th-century mural painting depicting landscapes and period costumes survives in a second-floor room, a Flemish bond brick gable end wall, and the three-room plan divided by a center hall.

Prior to construction of the home, the land was variously known as Bailey's Good Luck, Austin Adventure, Bellville, the Creek Farm, the Bailey Farm, and in earliest known records, "Taunton Deane." The land was originally granted to Francis Roberts (1636-1703), who arrived there from England. Roberts sold the land to Benjamin Cottman in a documented sale on June 25, 1671.

White Hall was listed on the National Register of Historic Places in 1984.
