= Manokin, Maryland =

Unincorporated community in Maryland, United States

- Unincorporated community
- Location within Maryland
- Coordinates: 38°06′55″N 75°45′21″W
- Country: United States
- State: Maryland
- County: Somerset
- Elevation: 7 ft (2.1 m)
- Time zone: UTC-5 (Eastern (EST))
  - Summer (DST): UTC-4 (EDT)
- ZIP Code: 21836
- Area codes: 410, 443, and 667
- GNIS feature ID: 590728

Manokin is an unincorporated community in Somerset County, Maryland, United States. It is located on Maryland Route 361 at the intersection of River Road. The George Maddox Farm, Sudler's Conclusion and Waters' River are listed on the National Register of Historic Places.

== See also ==
- Manokin Historic District
