= Jeptha Hayman House =

Historic house in Maryland, United States

- U.S. National Register of Historic Places
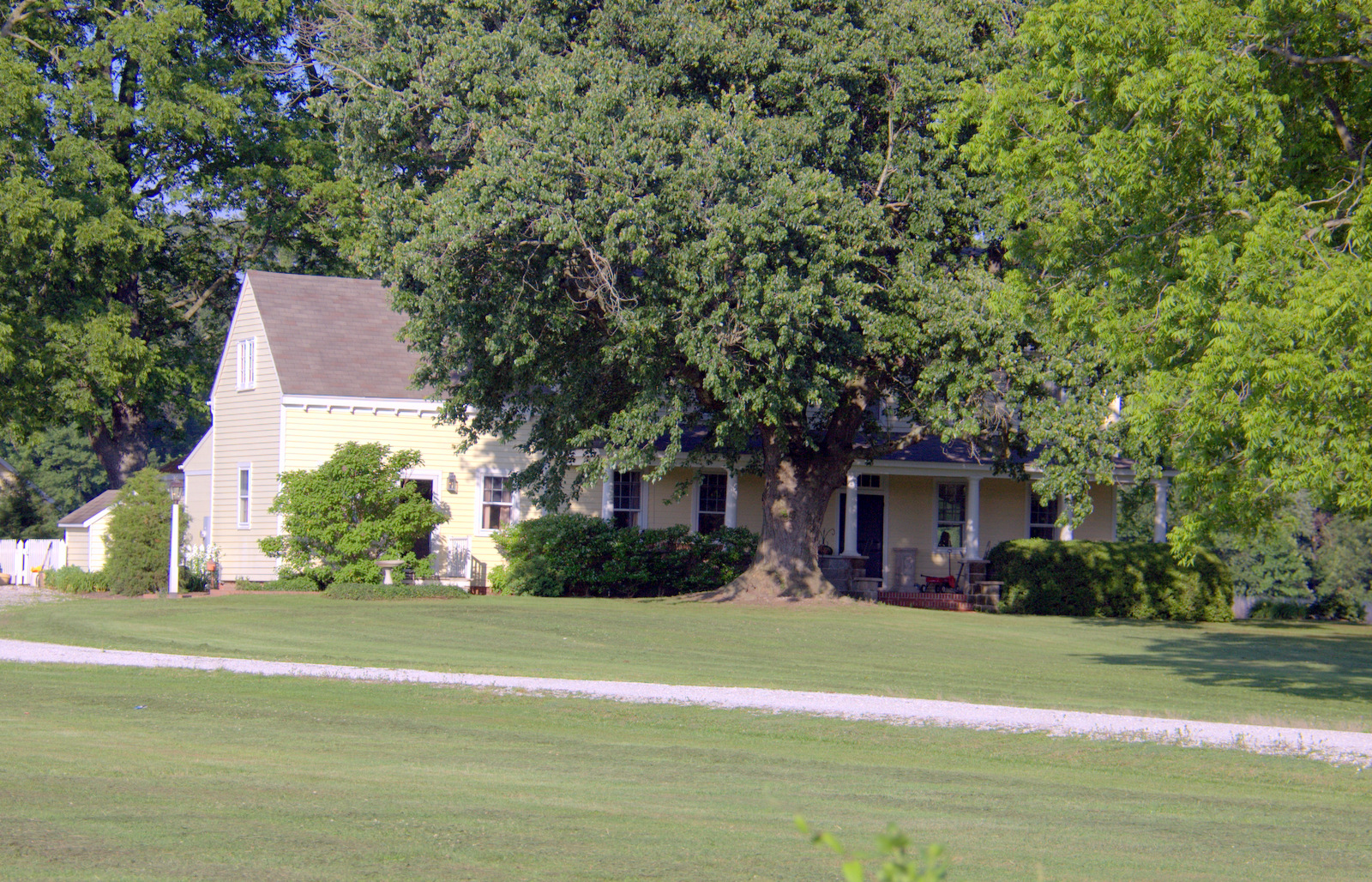

- Location within Maryland Location within the United States
- Location: 6805 Old Westover Marion Road, Kingston, Maryland
- Coordinates: 38°04′05″N 75°42′24″W
- Area: 1 acre (0.40 ha)
- Built: 1836
- Architectural style: Greek Revival, Federal, Vernacular farmhouse
- NRHP reference No.: 90001939
- Added to NRHP: December 27, 1990

The Jeptha Hayman House, also known as Hayman Farm, is a historic home in Kingston, Somerset County, Maryland, United States. It is a two-story, five-bay weatherboard frame dwelling in the Greek Revival style. The oldest portion is dated by an inscribed brick to 1836, with an addition from about 1850. It features a Tuscan-columned porch supported on a rusticated concrete block knee wall.

The house was listed on the National Register of Historic Places in 1990.
