= Dr. William B. Pritchard House =

Historic house in Maryland, United States

- U.S. National Register of Historic Places
- Location within Maryland Location within the United States
- Location: 29995 Polks Road, Princess Anne, Maryland
- Coordinates: 38°15′49″N 75°42′36″W
- Area: 15.3 acres (6.2 ha)
- Built: 1860
- Built by: Richard A. Malone
- Architectural style: Colonial Revival
- NRHP reference No.: 96000879
- Added to NRHP: August 8, 1996

Dr. William B. Pritchard House is a historic home located at Princess Anne, Somerset County, Maryland. It is a 2 1/2-story, five-bay, frame dwelling constructed in several stages between about 1860 and 1906. It features a porch with a distinctive octagonal gazebo. A traditional 19th-century farmhouse, it was reworked extensively around 1904–1906 in the Colonial Revival style by New York physician, Dr. William B. Pritchard as a country retreat.

It was listed on the National Register of Historic Places in 1996.
