= Tudor Hall (Upper Fairmount, Maryland) =

Historic house in Maryland, United States

- U.S. National Register of Historic Places
- Location within Maryland Location within the United States
- Location: Fairmount Road (MD 361), Upper Fairmount, Maryland
- Coordinates: 38°5′52″N 75°46′31″W
- Area: 22 acres (8.9 ha)
- Built: 1780
- Built by: Waters, John
- Architectural style: Pocomoke/Annemessex River
- NRHP reference No.: 74000966
- Added to NRHP: December 19, 1974

Tudor Hall, also known as Lockerman House, is a historic home located at Upper Fairmount, Somerset County, Maryland, United States. It is a 2 1/2-story beaded clapboard house, three bays wide by three deep, and built about 1780. The house features a brick colonnade, now in ruins.

Tudor Hall was listed on the National Register of Historic Places in 1974.
