= Reward (Shelltown, Maryland) =

Historic house in Maryland, United States

- U.S. National Register of Historic Places
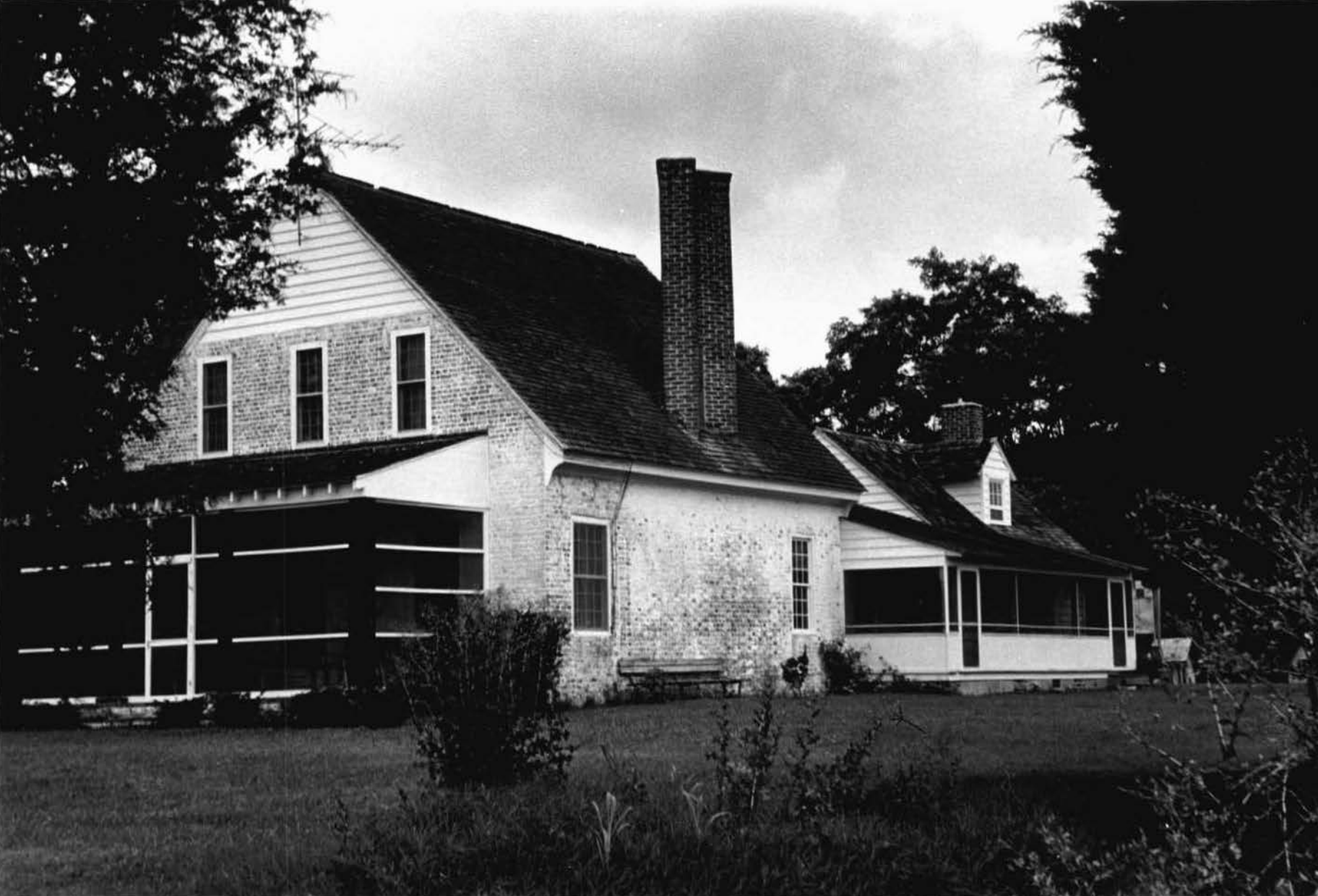

- Location within Maryland Location within the United States
- Location: Williams Point Road, Shelltown, Maryland
- Coordinates: 37°57′24″N 75°39′26″W
- Area: 32 acres (13 ha)
- Built: 1794
- Built by: Williams, Thomas
- NRHP reference No.: 74000965
- Added to NRHP: August 13, 1974

Reward, also known as Williams Point Farm, is a historic home located at Shelltown, Somerset County, Maryland, United States. It is a 1 1/2-story, gable-front brick dwelling with a steep gable roof with two diamond-shaped chimney stacks piercing the east slope of the roof. The main block is constructed of whitewashed brick laid in Flemish bond.

Reward was listed on the National Register of Historic Places in 1974.
