= Thomas W. Clyde (skipjack) =

- THOMAS W. CLYDE
- U.S. National Register of Historic Places
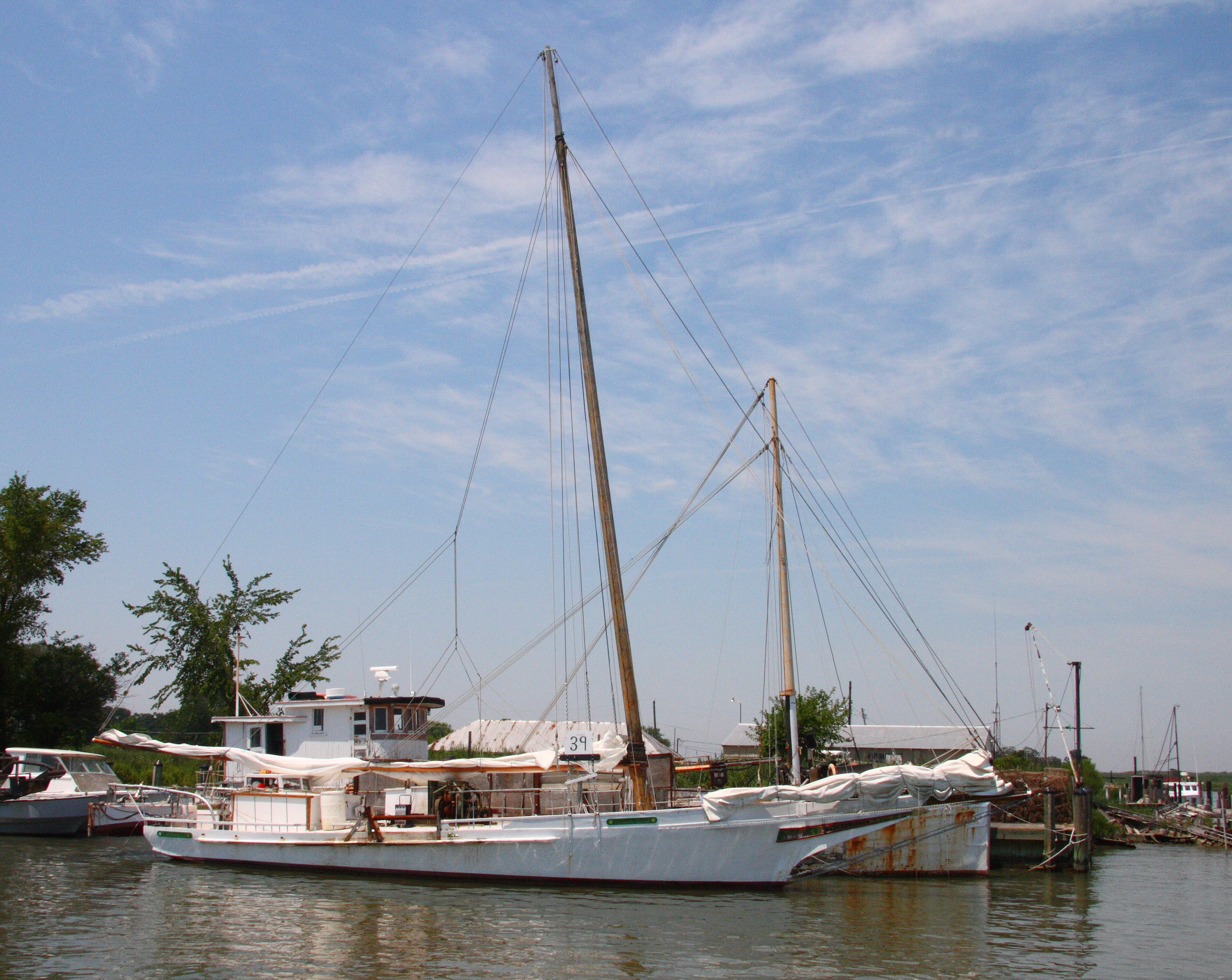
- Thomas W. Clyde in front of a workboat at Knapp's Narrows, Maryland

- Location within Maryland Location within the United States
- Location: Lower Thorofare, Wenona, Maryland
- Coordinates: 38°7′41″N 75°56′54″W
- Area: less than one acre
- Built: 1911
- Architectural style: Skipjack
- MPS: Chesapeake Bay Skipjack Fleet TR
- NRHP reference No.: 85001084
- Added to NRHP: May 16, 1985

The Thomas W. Clyde is a Chesapeake Bay skipjack, normally ported at Deal Island, Maryland. Built at Oriole, Maryland in 1911, the Clyde is one of nineteen surviving skipjacks built before 1912.

She was listed on the National Register of Historic Places in 1985. She is assigned Maryland dredge number 39.
