= Upper Fairmount, Maryland =

Unincorporated community in Maryland, United States

- Unincorporated community
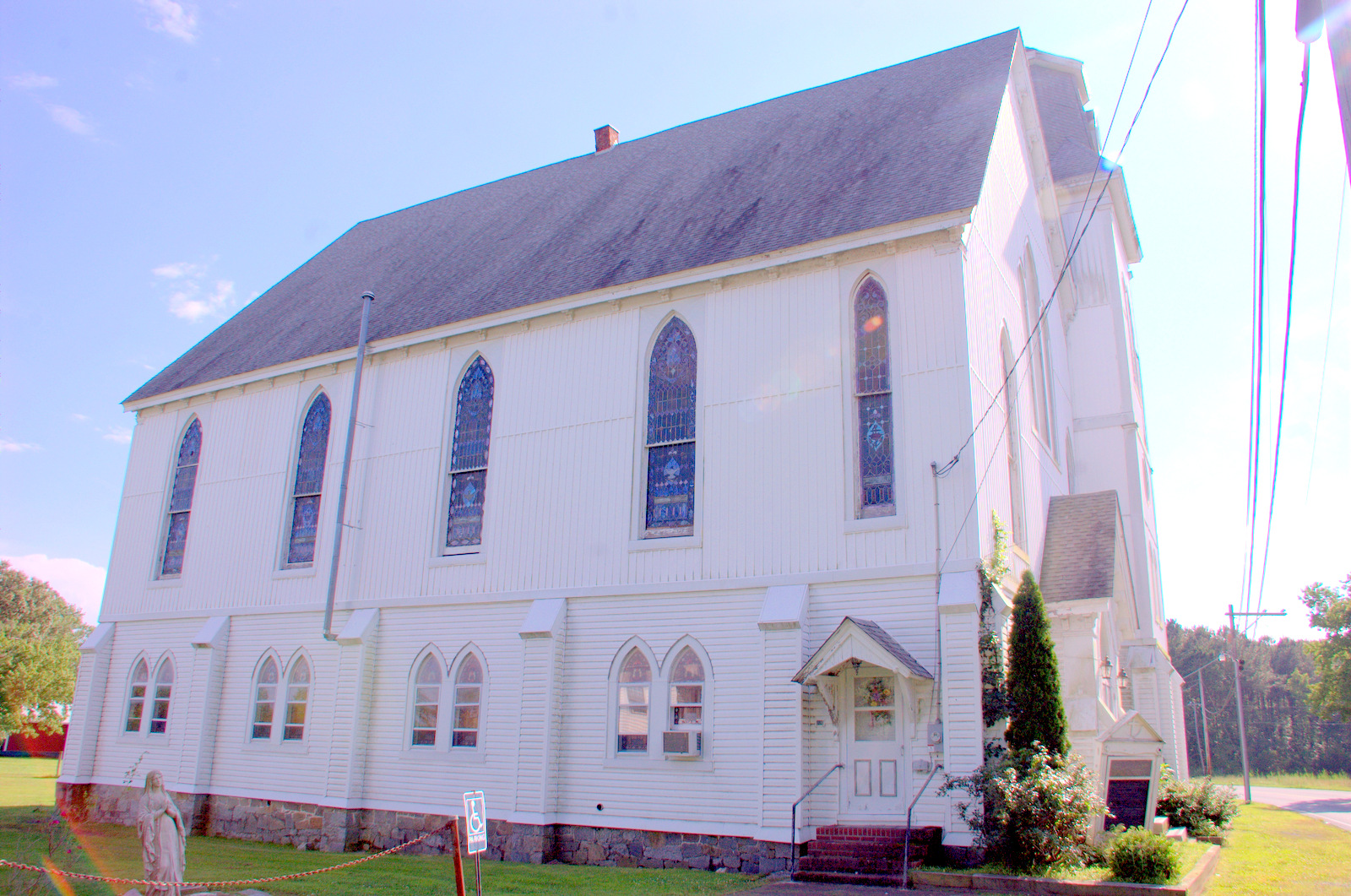
- Christ United Methodist Church

- Location within Maryland Location within the United States
- Coordinates: 38°06′14″N 75°47′29″W
- Country: United States
- State: Maryland
- County: Somerset
- Elevation: 3 ft (0.91 m)
- Time zone: UTC-5 (Eastern (EST))
  - Summer (DST): UTC-4 (EDT)
- ZIP code: 21867
- Area codes: 410, 443, and 667
- GNIS feature ID: 591458

Upper Fairmount is an unincorporated community in Somerset County, Maryland, United States. It is located at the intersection of Maryland Route 361 (Fairmount Road) and Upper Hill Road. The Academy Grove Historic District, Maddux House, Schoolridge Farm, Tudor Hall, and Upper Fairmount Historic District are listed on the National Register of Historic Places.
