= Hopkins, Virginia =

Unincorporated community in Virginia, United States

Coordinates: 37°47′28″N 75°42′16″W

Hopkins is an unincorporated community in Accomack County, Virginia, United States.
