= Shelltown, Maryland =

Unincorporated community in Maryland, United States

- Unincorporated community
- Location within Maryland
- Coordinates: 37°58′47″N 75°38′24″W
- Country: United States
- State: Maryland
- County: Somerset
- Elevation: 3 ft (0.91 m)
- Time zone: UTC-5 (Eastern (EST))
  - Summer (DST): UTC-4 (EDT)
- ZIP code: 21838
- Area codes: 410, 443, and 667
- GNIS feature ID: 591269

Shelltown is an unincorporated community in Somerset County, Maryland, United States. It is near the mouth of the Pocomoke River and takes its name from the abundant number of oysters, crabs, and other assorted crustaceans in the area.

Shelltown is accessible from Shelltown Road, which connects to Old Rehobeth Road and Coventry Parish Road, both leading to Maryland Route 667.

Reward was listed on the National Register of Historic Places in 1974.
