= Rock Creek Methodist Episcopal Church =

Historic church in Maryland, United States

- U.S. National Register of Historic Places
- Location within Maryland Location within the United States
- Location: Deal Island Rd. NE of Scotts Cove, Chance, Maryland
- Coordinates: 38°10′35″N 75°56′12″W
- Area: 1.5 acres (0.61 ha)
- Built: 1900
- Architect: Johnson, W.J.
- Architectural style: Gothic
- NRHP reference No.: 90001718
- Added to NRHP: November 2, 1990

Rock Creek Methodist Episcopal Church is a historic Methodist Episcopal church located at Chance, Somerset County, Maryland. It is a cross-plan Gothic-style church supported by a continuous common bond brick foundation, built in 1900. It features a three-story bell tower capped by a pyramidal spire. Also on the property is a single-story L-shaped frame church hall built in 1928.

It was listed on the National Register of Historic Places in 1990.
