= Sudler's Conclusion =

Historic residence in Maryland

- U.S. National Register of Historic Places
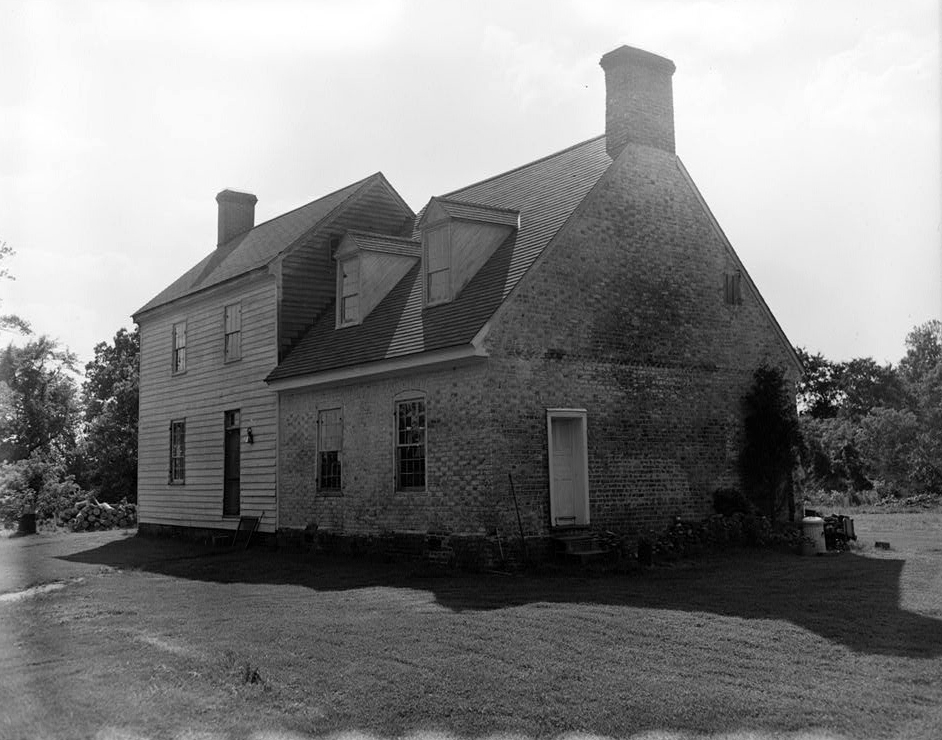

- Location within Maryland Location within the United States
- Location: Hood Road, Manokin, Maryland
- Coordinates: 38°7′16″N 75°46′37″W
- Area: 51.2 acres (20.7 ha)
- Built: 1798
- NRHP reference No.: 73000936
- Added to NRHP: August 28, 1973

Sudler's Conclusion is a historic home located at Manokin, Somerset County, Maryland. It is a two-part house consisting of a 1 1/2-story, early-18th-century Flemish bond brick section with a frame two-story west wing erected about 1840. Also on the property is a log smokehouse, frame tobacco barn, and a small private cemetery.

It was listed on the National Register of Historic Places in 1973.
