= Fannie L. Daugherty (skipjack) =

- FANNIE L. DAUGHERTY
- U.S. National Register of Historic Places
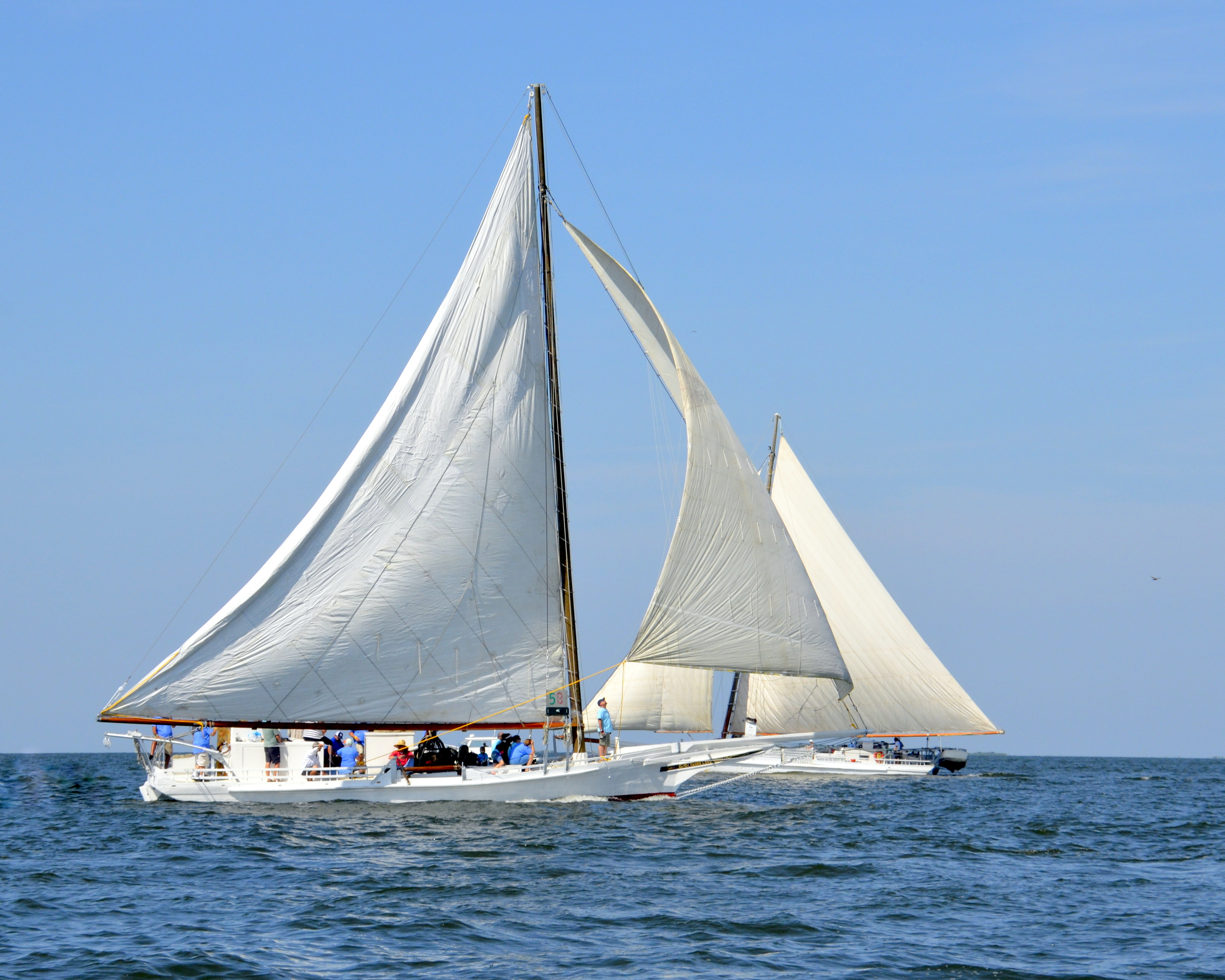

- Location within Maryland Location within the United States
- Location: Lower Thorofare; Wenona, Maryland
- Coordinates: 38°7′41″N 75°56′54″W
- Area: less than one acre
- Built: 1904
- Architectural style: Skipjack
- MPS: Chesapeake Bay Skipjack Fleet TR
- NRHP reference No.: 85001081
- Added to NRHP: May 16, 1985

The Fannie L. Daugherty is a Chesapeake Bay skipjack, built in 1904 at Crisfield, Maryland. She is a 41.3-foot-long (12.6 m) two-sail bateau, or "V"-bottomed deadrise type of centerboard sloop. She is built by cross-planked construction methods and has a beam of 8 feet (2.4 m) and a depth of 3.6 feet (1.1 m). She one of the 35 surviving traditional Chesapeake Bay skipjacks and a member of the last commercial sailing fleet in the United States. She is located at Wenona, Somerset County, Maryland.

She was listed on the National Register of Historic Places in 1985. She is assigned Maryland dredge number 58, and was previously dredge 2.
