= St. Mark's Episcopal Church (Kingston, Maryland) =

Historic church in Maryland, United States

- U.S. National Register of Historic Places
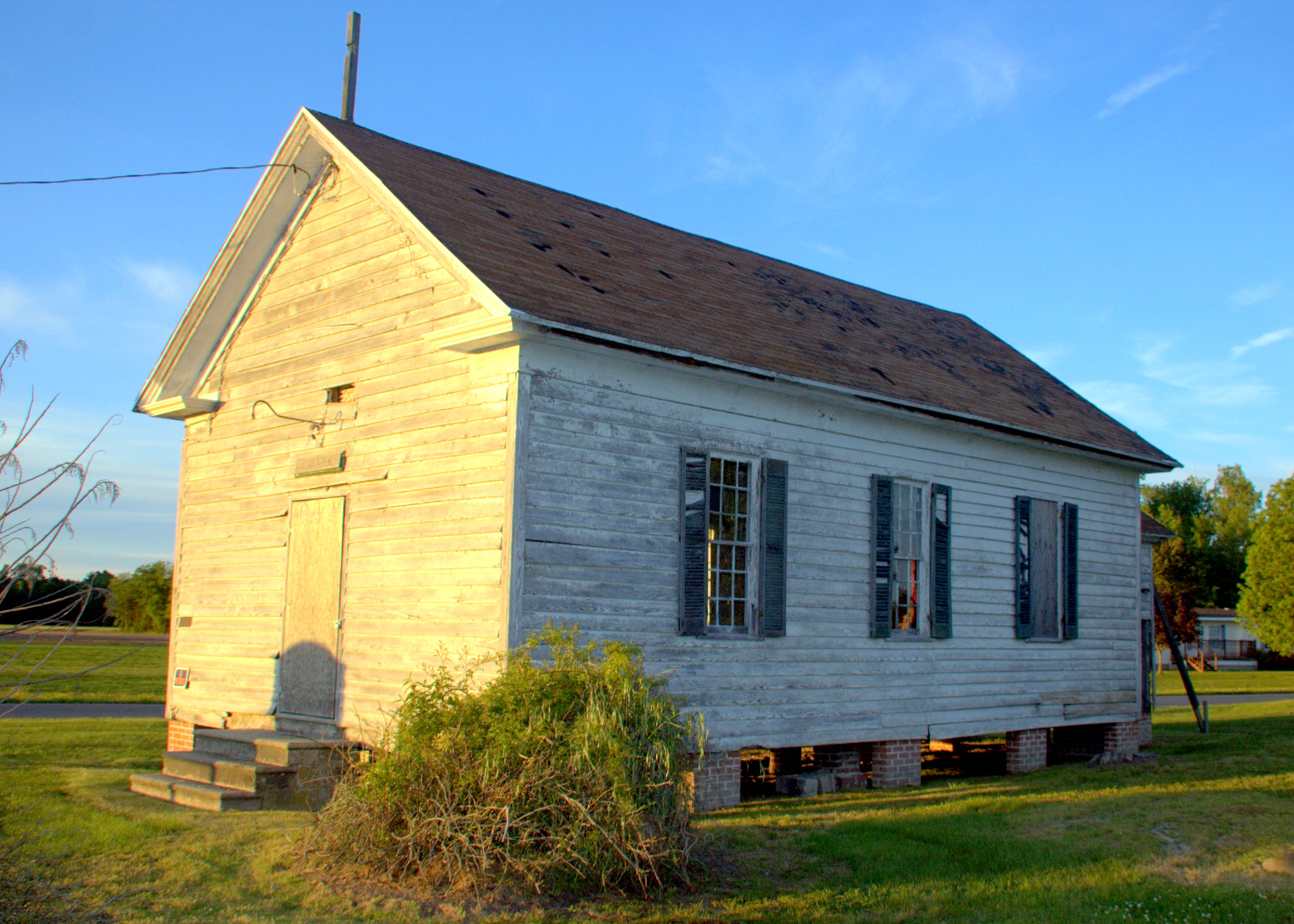

- Location within Maryland Location within the United States
- Location: 6973 Old Westover Marion Road, Kingston, Maryland
- Coordinates: 38°4′21″N 75°42′35″W
- Area: 1.5 acres (0.61 ha)
- Built: 1846
- Architectural style: Greek Revival
- NRHP reference No.: 90001569
- Added to NRHP: October 25, 1990

St. Mark's Episcopal Church is a historic Episcopal church located at Kingston, Somerset County, Maryland. It is a single-story one-by-three-bay frame structure in the Greek Revival style, built in 1846 and moved to this site in 1924. Also on the property is cemetery with about a dozen 19th-century burials.

It was listed on the National Register of Historic Places in 1990.
