= William Costen House =

- Formerly listed on the U.S. National Register of Historic Places
- Nearest city: Courthouse Hill Road, near Wellington, Maryland
- Area: 22.9 acres (9.3 ha)
- Built: 1829
- NRHP reference No.: 85000654

Significant dates
- Added to NRHP: March 28, 1985
- Removed from NRHP: July 25, 1994

The William Costen House, also known as the Old Costen Homestead, was a historic home located near Wellington, Maryland. It was constructed in 1829, and was a two-story, three-bay, gable-front side-passage/double pile frame house on a common bond brick foundation.

It was listed on the National Register of Historic Places in 1985, and delisted in 1994, after being burned to the ground.
