= Clarence Crockett =

History
- Launched: 1908

General characteristics
- Tonnage: 7 NRT
- Length: 44.6 ft (13.6 m)
- Beam: 14.7 ft (4.5 m)
- Depth: 3.0 ft (0.91 m)
- Clarence Crockett
- U.S. National Register of Historic Places
- Location within Maryland
- Location: Lower Thorofare, Wenona, Maryland
- Coordinates: 38°7′41″N 75°56′54″W
- Built: 1908
- Architectural style: Skipjack
- MPS: Chesapeake Bay Skipjack Fleet TR
- NRHP reference No.: 85001079
- Added to NRHP: 16 May 1985

Clarence Crockett is a Chesapeake Bay skipjack, built in 1908 at Deep Creek, Virginia. She is a 44.6-foot-long (13.6 m) two-sail bateau, or "V"-bottomed deadrise type of centerboard sloop. She has a beam of 14.7 feet (4.5 m) and a depth of 3.0 feet (0.91 m) with a net registered tonnage of 7. She is one of the 35 surviving traditional Chesapeake Bay skipjacks and a member of the last commercial sailing fleet in the United States. She is located at Wenona, Somerset County, Maryland.

She was listed on the National Register of Historic Places in 1985. She is assigned Maryland dredge number 48.
