= Academy Grove Historic District =

Historic district in Maryland, United States

- U.S. National Register of Historic Places
- U.S. Historic district
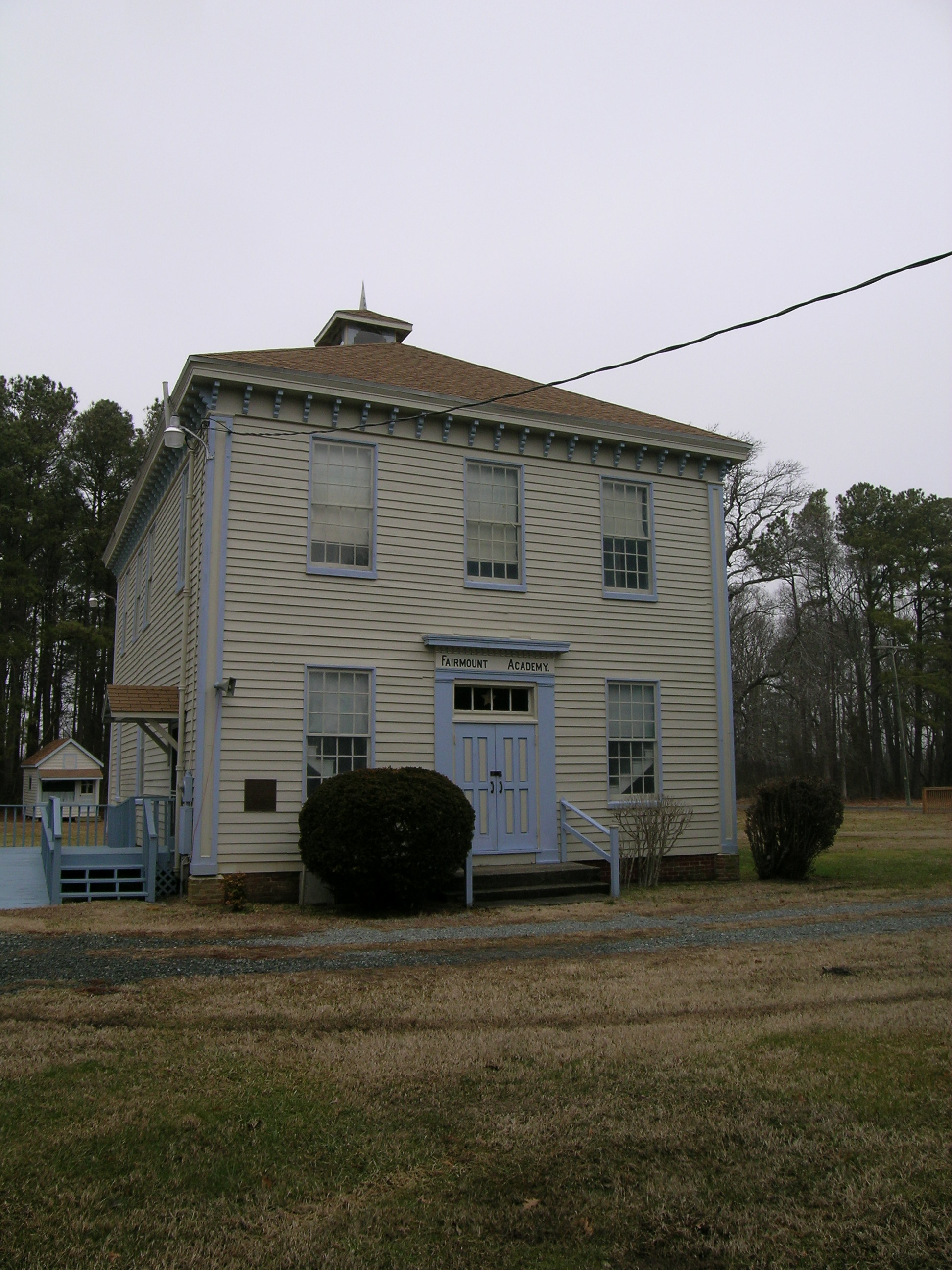
- Fairmount Academy in 2004

- Location within Maryland Location within the United States
- Location: Fairmount Rumbley Road (MD 361), Upper Fairmount, Maryland
- Coordinates: 38°5′58″N 75°48′32″W
- Area: 1.5 acres (0.61 ha)
- Built: 1860
- Architectural style: Italianate
- NRHP reference No.: 84001863
- Added to NRHP: May 3, 1984

Academy Grove Historic District is a national historic district at Upper Fairmount, Somerset County, Maryland, United States. It comprises two Italianate-influenced frame buildings. These include the Fairmount Academy, constructed between 1860 and 1867 to serve as a public school for the Potato Neck District, and the Knights of Pythias Hall, erected adjacent to the Academy about 1872 by the Fairmount Lodge No. 77 of the Knights of Pythias. As early as 1883 the Knights of Pythias Hall was rented by the Board of Education for classroom space; when the Fairmount Lodge disbanded in 1911, the Hall continued to provide additional classroom space for the Academy.

It was added to the National Register of Historic Places in 1984.
