= Maryland Route 361 =

State highway in Maryland, United States

Maryland Route 361
- Fairmount Road
- Maryland Route 361 highlighted in red

Route information
- Maintained by MDSHA
- Length: 5.62 mi (9.04 km)
- Existed: 1927–present

Major junctions
- West end: End of state maintenance in Upper Fairmount
- East end: MD 413 in Westover

Location
- Country: United States
- State: Maryland
- Counties: Somerset

Highway system
- Maryland highway system; Interstate; US; State; Scenic Byways
← MD 359	→ MD 362

Maryland Route 361 (MD 361) is a state highway in the U.S. state of Maryland. Known as Fairmount Road, the state highway runs 5.62 miles (9.04 km) from the beginning of state maintenance in Upper Fairmount east to MD 413 in Westover. MD 361 provides access to the villages of Manokin and Upper Fairmount. The state highway was constructed from the Westover end beginning in 1926. MD 361 was completed west through Upper Fairmount in the early 1930s.

== Route description ==
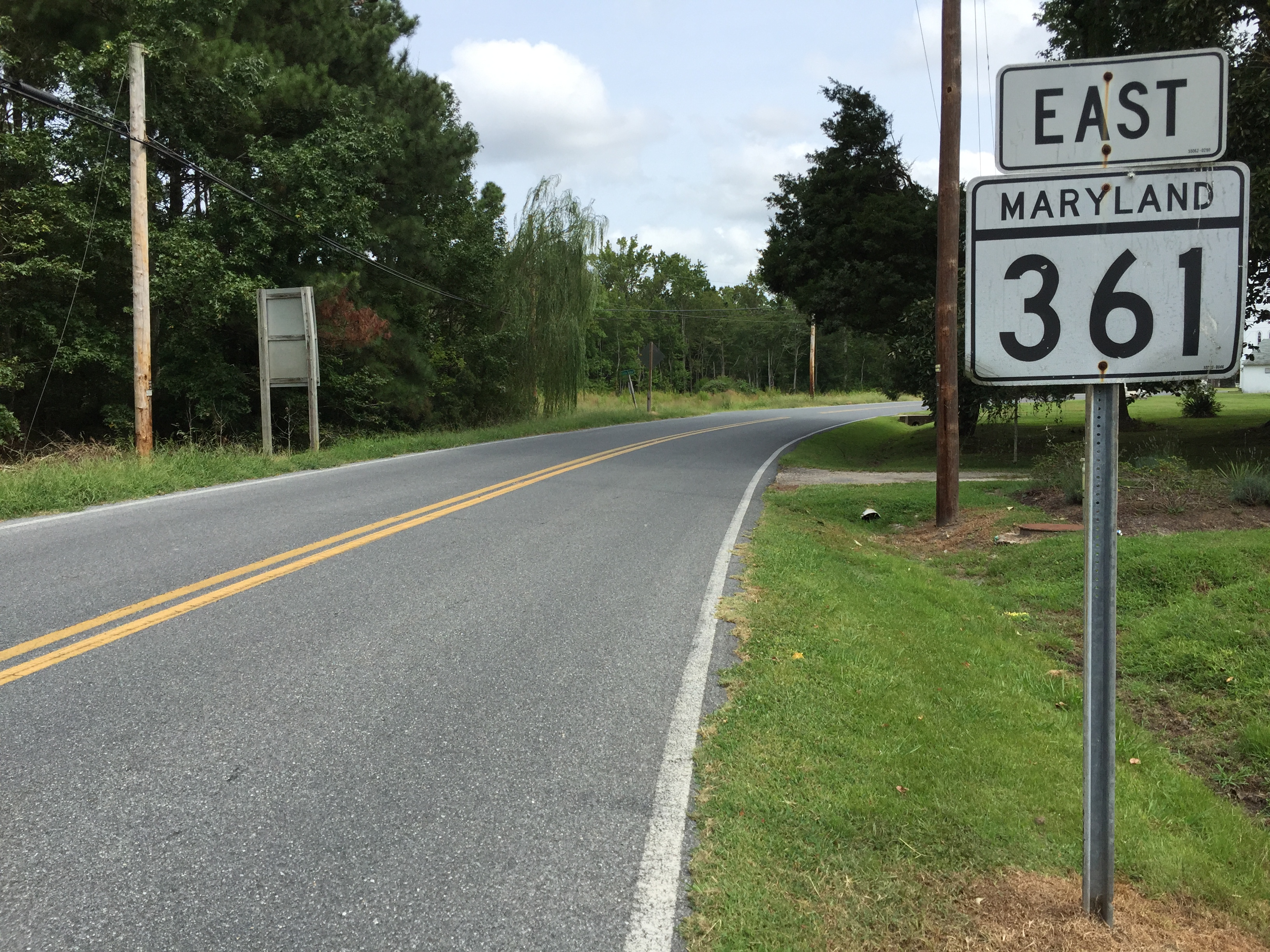
View east at the west end of MD 361 in Upper Fairmount

MD 361 begins on Fairmount Road between the Fairmount Volunteer Fire Department and Clinton Bozman Road on the west edge of Upper Fairmount. Fairmount Road continues west as a county highway toward Fairmount, Frenchtown, and Rumbly. MD 361 heads east as a two-lane undivided road through the Upper Fairmount Historic District, passing Upper Hill Road and an old alignment of the highway, Jones Factory Road, before leaving Upper Fairmount and running through the Chesapeake Forest Lands. The state highway leaves the forest and passes through the hamlet of Manokin, where the highway intersects Millard Long Road, which heads north toward Revells Neck, and River Road, which heads south toward Kingston. MD 361 passes the county landfill and Charles Layfield Road before reaching its eastern terminus at MD 413 (Crisfield Highway). Ritzel Road, the old alignment of MD 361, continues east to its terminus at Old Westover–Marion Road, the old alignment of MD 413.

== History ==
The first section of MD 361 was constructed in 1926 from the old alignment of MD 413 west to Charles Layfield Road. The highway was extended west through Manokin by 1930. MD 361 was completed through Upper Fairmount in 1933. The part of the state highway between MD 413 and the old alignment of MD 413 was removed from state maintenance by 1961.

== Junction list ==
The entire route is in Somerset County.

Location	mi	km	Destinations	Notes
Upper Fairmount	0.00	0.00	Fairmount Road west – Fairmount	Western terminus
Westover	5.62	9.04	MD 413 (Crisfield Highway) to US 13 – Salisbury, Crisfield	Eastern terminus
1.000 mi = 1.609 km; 1.000 km = 0.621 mi
