= George Maddox Farm =

Historic house in Maryland, United States

- U.S. National Register of Historic Places
- Location within Maryland Location within the United States
- Location: River Rd., Manokin, Maryland
- Coordinates: 38°5′59″N 75°45′5″W
- Area: 33 acres (13 ha)
- Architectural style: Queen Anne
- NRHP reference No.: 85002410
- Added to NRHP: September 17, 1985

George Maddox Farm, also known as Cottage Hall Farm or Albert Sudler Farm, is a historic farm complex located at Manokin, Somerset County, Maryland. It is an intact complex of 15 agricultural buildings and structures dating from about 1800 through the early 20th century. The complex includes six pre-Civil War structures including a frame granary, two dairies, a log smokehouse, another (ruined) log outbuilding, and a frame kitchen/quarter. Seven post-war structures include a barn, two garages, tenant house, privy, well house, and chicken house. The main house is a 2 1/2-story irregular-plan Queen Anne house, roughly cruciform in plan. An early-19th-century single-story kitchen extends from the back of the house.

It was listed on the National Register of Historic Places in 1985.
