= Schoolridge Farm =

Historic house in Maryland, United States

- U.S. National Register of Historic Places
- Location within Maryland Location within the United States
- Location: Fairmount Rumbley Road (MD 361), Upper Fairmount, Maryland
- Coordinates: 38°5′53″N 75°48′19″W
- Area: 14.9 acres (6.0 ha)
- Built: 1780
- Architectural style: Federal
- NRHP reference No.: 84001876
- Added to NRHP: September 7, 1984

The Schoolridge Farm, also known as School House Ridge, is a historic home located at Upper Fairmount, Somerset County, Maryland, United States. It is a two-story two-bay side-hall / double pile Flemish bond brick house with a steeply pitched wood shingle roof, built about 1780. Attached to the house is a one-story frame kitchen wing and 1 1/2-story, three-bay frame addition. Also on the property is a 19th-century frame smokehouse, modern utility building and a screened-in gazebo.

The Schoolridge Farm was listed on the National Register of Historic Places in 1984.
