= Kingston, Maryland =

Unincorporated community in Maryland, United States

- Unincorporated community
- Location within Maryland
- Coordinates: 38°04′28″N 75°43′41″W
- Country: United States
- State: Maryland
- County: Somerset
- Elevation: 7 ft (2.1 m)
- Time zone: UTC-5 (Eastern (EST))
  - Summer (DST): UTC-4 (EDT)
- ZIP code: 21871
- Area codes: 410, 443, and 667
- GNIS feature ID: 585318

Kingston is an unincorporated community in Somerset County, Maryland, United States. A small community at the head of navigation of the Big Annemessex River, it is located on Maryland Route 413 at the intersection of Kingston Lane. A very rural community far from any urban development, it is quite small in population, the land dominated by agricultural fields and tree farms.

The ZIP code is 21871, shared with Westover to the north. Its three-digit exchange is 623, the same as in Marion, and the area code is 410.

== Historic places ==
Kingston, Maryland is home to a couple of properties placed on the National Register of Historic Places.

- Jeptha Hayman House was placed on the National Register of Historic Places in 1990.
- Kingston Hall is a historic house dating from the 19th century. It is accessible from Old Westover-Marion Road, physically located close to MD 413 and the Big Annemessex River. The property was placed on the National Register of Historic Places in 1974.
- Saint Mark's Episcopal Church is located in the community as well, at the intersection of Old Westover-Marion Road and Charles Barnes Road. It was listed on the National Register of Historical Places in 1990.

== Transportation ==
Kingston is located close to several other communities. Westover is to the north, Marion and Crisfield to the south, and Rehobeth and Pocomoke City to the east.

=== Main roads ===
- Old Westover-Marion Road is the original alignment of MD 413. As such, it is the main location of the homes and businesses in the area. It also provides a link back to Maryland Route 667.
- Maryland Route 413 is the main highway between U.S. Route 13 and Crisfield. The two-lane, 55 mph (89 km/h) highway takes most of the traffic in the area off Old Westover-Marion Road.
- Kingston Lane runs between Old Westover-Marion Road and River Road, intersecting MD 413 in the process. It is the location of the Six L's Packing Company and a lumber yard. The road between MD 413 and Old Westover-Marion was once Maryland Route 356. Kingston Lane continues south as Charles Cannon Road, which ends in Marion Station.

=== Navigable rivers ===
The head of navigation for the Big Annemessex River is located in the community. The river is only navigable west of River Road.

=== Public transportation ===
The commuter bus service of the lower Eastern Shore, Shore Transit, serves the community on its Route 706 North and Route 706 South. Both routes commute between Crisfield and Princess Anne with limited service to Salisbury. They operate on MD 413 and there are no fixed bus stops.
