= Maryland Route 359 =

State highway in Maryland, United States

Maryland Route 359
- Bypass Road
- Maryland Route 359 highlighted in red

Route information
- Maintained by MDSHA
- Length: 1.09 mi (1.75 km)
- Existed: 1974–present

Major junctions
- South end: Dead end in Pocomoke City
- North end: MD 756 near Pocomoke City

Location
- Country: United States
- State: Maryland
- Counties: Worcester

Highway system
- Maryland highway system; Interstate; US; State; Scenic Byways
← MD 358	→ MD 361

Maryland Route 359 (MD 359) is a state highway in the U.S. state of Maryland. Known as Bypass Road, the state highway runs 1.09 miles (1.75 km) from a dead end adjacent to the junction of U.S. Route 13 (US 13) and US 113 north to MD 756 within Pocomoke City. What is now MD 359 and unsigned MD 250A was part of a bypass of the center of Pocomoke City for the southernmost part of US 113 that was constructed in the mid-1930s. US 113 originally followed MD 756 to its southern terminus at what is now US 13 Business. The bypass was itself bypassed in the 1970s when US 113 was expanded to a four-lane divided highway to end at US 13.

== Route description ==
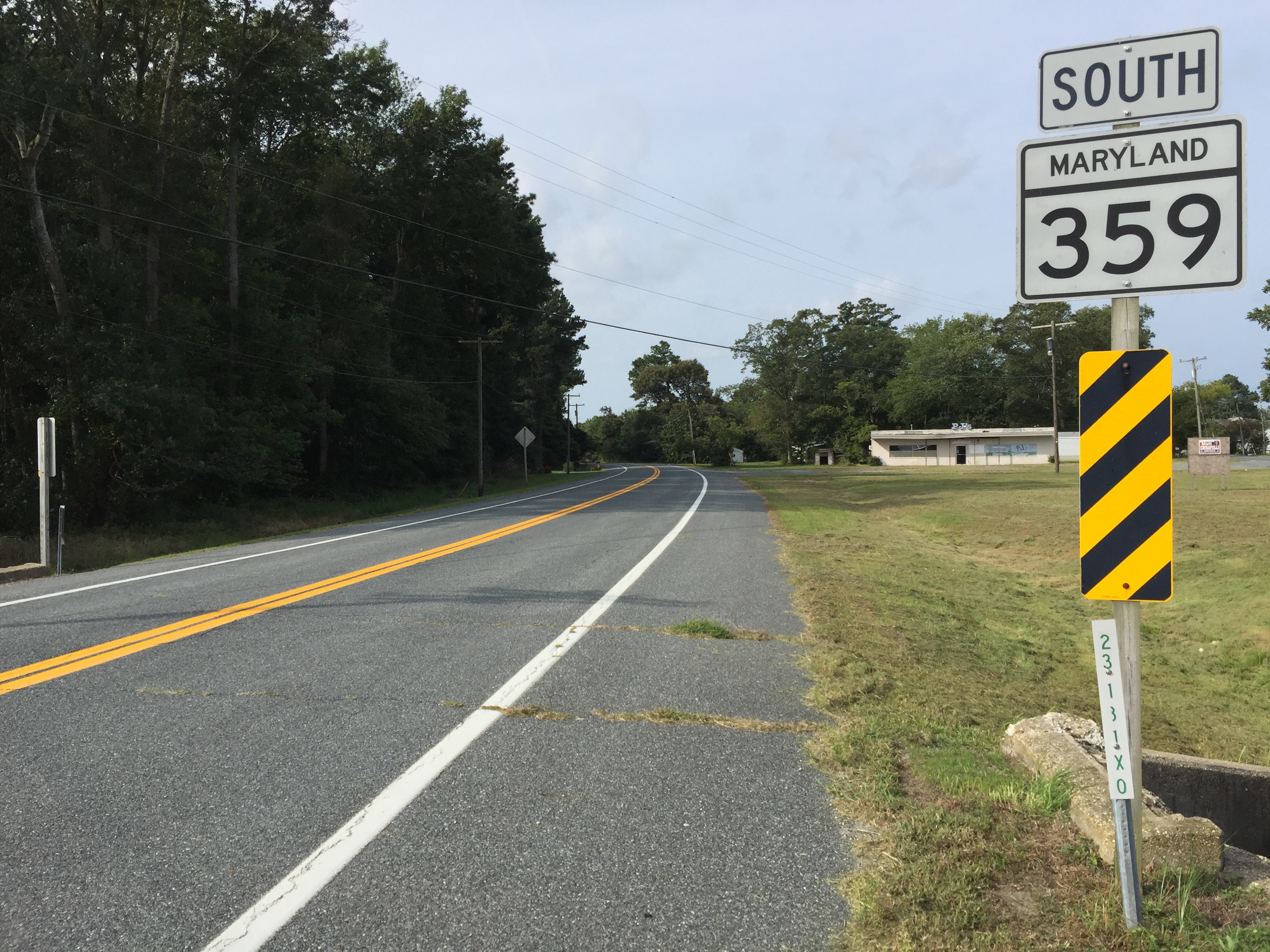
View south along MD 359 at MD 756 near Pocomoke City

MD 359 begins at a dead end adjacent to Worcester Post 93 of the American Legion. The state highway heads north as a two-lane undivided road and meets American Legion Drive (unsigned MD 359B), which provides access to US 113 near its southern terminus at US 13. MD 359 continues north through a mix of residences and farms, meeting Carter Road, Byrd Road, and Groton Road at a five-way intersection. The state highway reaches its northern terminus at an oblique intersection with MD 756 (Old Snow Hill Road), a short distance west of MD 756's end at US 113.

== History ==
US 113 presently follows its third alignment in Pocomoke City. The first alignment, to which US 113 was assigned in 1927, began at US 13 (now US 13 Business) within the city limits, following Sixth Street and Linden Avenue to the western end of what is now MD 756. US 113 then followed MD 756 to its present intersection with US 113. The second alignment is followed by present-day MD 250A and MD 359 between US 13 (now US 13 Business) and MD 756, and MD 359A north of MD 756. This bypass was completed in 1936. The present US 113 four-lane divided highway was constructed in 1974, cutting off the second alignment's direct access to US 13, which had moved to its own four-lane divided bypass of Pocomoke City in 1963.

== Junction list ==
The entire route is in Pocomoke City, Worcester County.

mi	km	Destinations	Notes
0.00	0.00	Cul-de-sac at American Legion	Southern terminus
0.14	0.23	American Legion Drive north to US 113	Unsigned MD 359B
1.09	1.75	MD 756 (Old Snow Hill Road) to US 113 – Snow Hill	Northern terminus
1.000 mi = 1.609 km; 1.000 km = 0.621 mi

== Auxiliary routes ==
MD 359 has two auxiliary routes. Both MD 359A and MD 359B were assigned at the same time as MD 359 shortly after the completion of the present alignment of US 113 in the 1970s.

- MD 359A is the designation for Olds Road, a 0.14-mile (0.23 km) spur from MD 756 north parallel to US 113 that serves a few residences. MD 359A is part of the original alignment of US 113.
- MD 359B is the designation for American Legion Drive, a 0.06-mile (0.097 km) connector between MD 359 and US 113 near the former's southern terminus.
