= Maddux House =

Historic house in Maryland, United States

- U.S. National Register of Historic Places
- Location within Maryland Location within the United States
- Location: 9084 Maddox Island Road, Upper Fairmount, Maryland
- Coordinates: 38°7′59″N 75°47′44″W
- Area: 1.7 acres (0.69 ha)
- Built: 1780
- Architectural style: Federal, Greek Revival
- NRHP reference No.: 02001574
- Added to NRHP: December 27, 2002

Maddux House, also known as Maddux's Island, Maddux's Warehouse, Inclosure, and Capt. William T. Ford House, is a historic home located at Upper Fairmount, Somerset County, Maryland. It is located on a high ridge of land overlooking the Manokin River and Back Creek. It is a two-story, six-bay, L-shaped frame house with steeply pitched roofs. The house dates to the 18th century, with an addition dating to around 1850–60. It was listed on the National Register of Historic Places in 2002.
