= Wenona, Maryland =

Unincorporated community in Maryland, United States

- Unincorporated community
- Location within Maryland
- Coordinates: 38°08′20″N 75°57′01″W
- Country: United States
- State: Maryland
- County: Somerset
- Elevation: 0 ft (0 m)
- Time zone: UTC-5 (Eastern (EST))
  - Summer (DST): UTC-4 (EDT)
- ZIP code: 21821
- Area codes: 410, 443, and 667
- GNIS feature ID: 591510

Wenona is an unincorporated community located on Deal Island in Somerset County, Maryland, United States. It is located at the western end of Maryland Route 363, Deal Island Road.

The Clarence Crockett, F. C. Lewis, Jr, Fannie L. Daugherty, Howard, Susan May and Thomas W. Clyde are listed on the National Register of Historic Places.
