= Teackle Mansion =

Historic house in Maryland, United States

- U.S. National Register of Historic Places
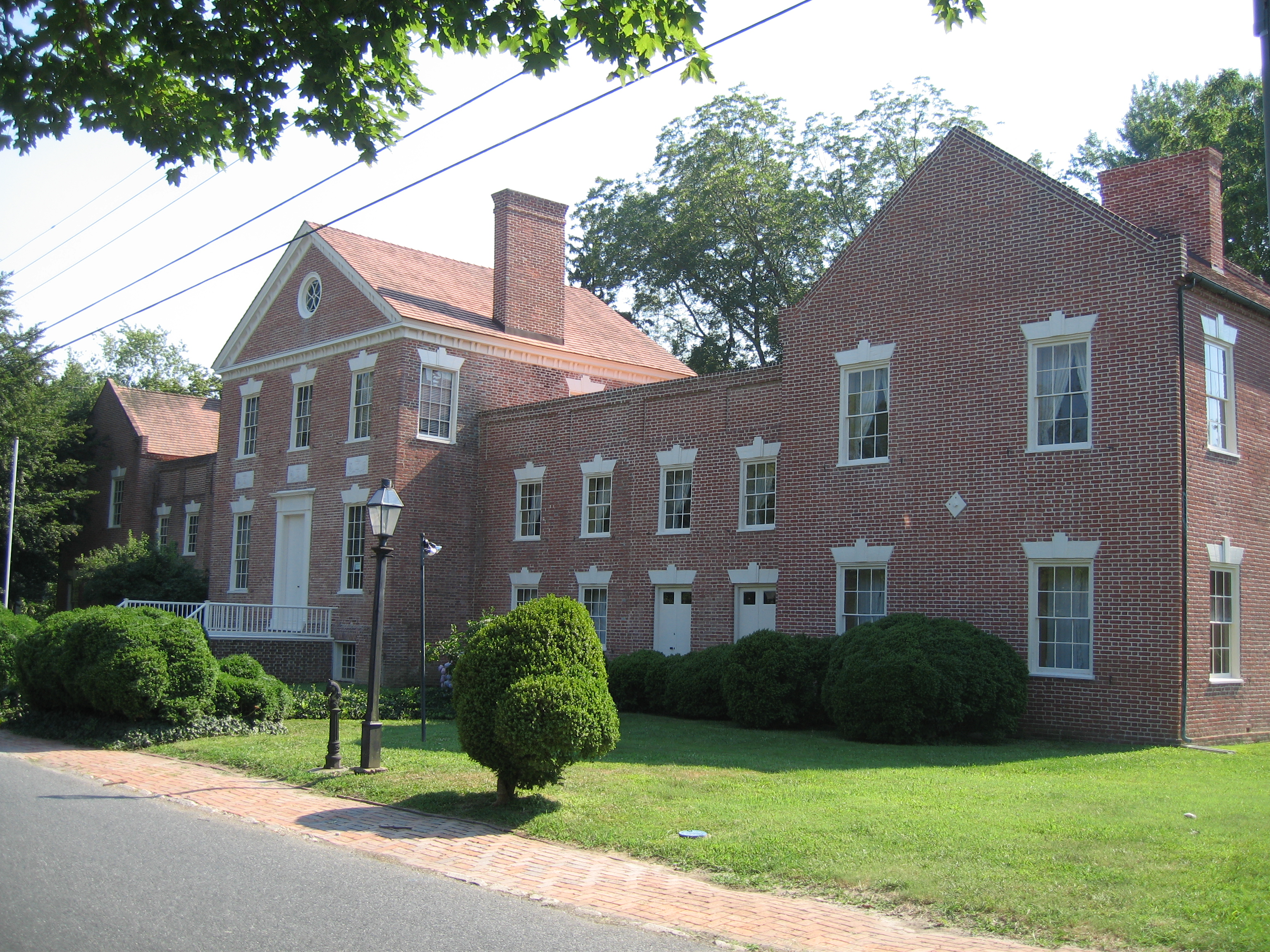
- Teackle Mansion

- Location within Maryland Location within the United States
- Interactive map showing the location of Teackle Mansion
- Location: 11736 Mansion Street; Princess Anne, Maryland
- Coordinates: 38°12′12″N 75°42′8″W
- Area: 9 acres (3.6 ha)
- Built: 1802-1819
- Architectural style: Neoclassical
- NRHP reference No.: 71000378
- Added to NRHP: October 26, 1971

The Teackle Mansion is a historic estate at 11736 Mansion Street, Princess Anne, Maryland, United States. It was constructed between 1802 and 1819 for Littleton Dennis Teackle and his wife Elizabeth Upshur Teackle. It is notable for its Neoclassical architecture with many distinctive features, and its 19th century period rooms. It is the home of the Somerset County Historical Society, and was added to the National Register of Historic Places in 1971.

It is mentioned in the novel The Entailed Hat by George Alfred Townsend.
