= Chance, Maryland =

- CDP
- Coordinates: 38°10′37″N 75°56′21″W
- Country: United States
- State: Maryland
- County: Somerset

Area
  - Total: 2.58 sq mi (6.69 km^{2})
  - Land: 1.67 sq mi (4.32 km^{2})
  - Water: 0.92 sq mi (2.37 km^{2})
- Elevation: 3.3 ft (1 m)

Population (2020)
  - Total: 330
  - Density: 197.6/sq mi (76.31/km^{2})
- Time zone: UTC−5 (Eastern (EST))
  - Summer (DST): UTC−4 (EDT)
- ZIP code: 21821
- Area code: 410
- FIPS code: 24-15075
- GNIS feature ID: 0595203

Chance is a census-designated place (CDP) in Somerset County, Maryland, United States. The population was 377 at the 2000 census. It is included in the Salisbury, Maryland-Delaware Metropolitan Statistical Area.

== History ==
The community took its name from the estate of the same name of an early settler.

The Ida May and Rock Creek Methodist Episcopal Church are listed on the National Register of Historic Places.

== Geography ==
Chance is located at 38°10′37″N 75°56′21″W (38.176818, −75.939272).

According to the United States Census Bureau, the CDP has a total area of 2.6 square miles (6.7 km^{2}), of which 1.7 square miles (4.4 km^{2}) is land and 0.8 square miles (2.1 km^{2}) (32.68%) is water.

== Demographics ==
Historical population
| Census | Pop. | Note | %± |
|---|---|---|---|
| 2000 | 377 | | — |
| 2020 | 330 | | — |
U.S. Decennial Census

As of the census of 2000, there were 377 people, 161 households, and 113 families residing in the CDP. The population density was 218.1 inhabitants per square mile (84.2/km^{2}). There were 254 housing units at an average density of 147.0 per square mile (56.8/km^{2}). The racial makeup of the CDP was 75.60% White, 23.61% African American, 0.27% from other races, and 0.53% from two or more races. Hispanic or Latino of any race were 0.53% of the population.

There were 161 households, out of which 17.4% had children under the age of 18 living with them, 54.0% were married couples living together, 12.4% had a female householder with no husband present, and 29.2% were non-families. 23.6% of all households were made up of individuals, and 10.6% had someone living alone who was 65 years of age or older. The average household size was 2.34 and the average family size was 2.74.

In the CDP, the population was spread out, with 18.8% under the age of 18, 5.0% from 18 to 24, 24.1% from 25 to 44, 29.7% from 45 to 64, and 22.3% who were 65 years of age or older. The median age was 47 years. For every 100 females, there were 93.3 males. For every 100 females age 18 and over, there were 96.2 males.

The median income for a household in the CDP was $34,531, and the median income for a family was $37,969. Males had a median income of $25,469 versus $21,875 for females. The per capita income for the CDP was $15,706. About 16.8% of families and 23.2% of the population were below the poverty line, including 51.9% of those under age 18 and 14.3% of those age 65 or over.

== Notable person ==
- Dale Midkiff (born 1959), actor, best known for Elvis and Me (TV movie) and Pet Sematary
