= Upper Fairmount Historic District =

Historic district in Maryland, United States

- U.S. National Register of Historic Places
- U.S. Historic district
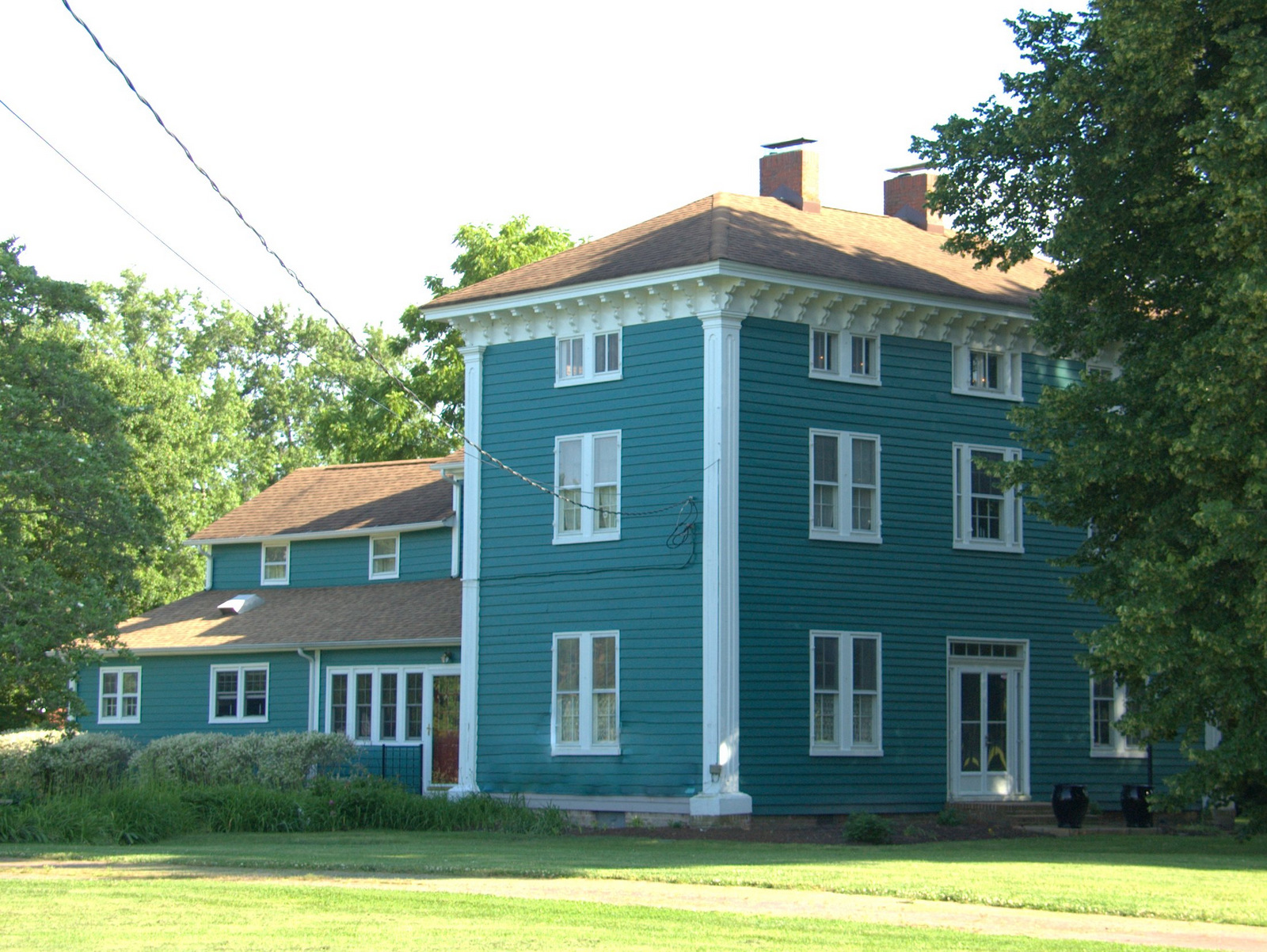

- Location within Maryland Location within the United States
- Location: Both sides of MD 361, Upper Fairmount, Maryland
- Coordinates: 38°6′25″N 75°48′1″W
- Area: 80 acres (32 ha)
- Built: 1825
- Architectural style: Greek Revival, Late Victorian, Federal
- NRHP reference No.: 93000900
- Added to NRHP: September 13, 1993

Upper Fairmount Historic District is a national historic district at Upper Fairmount, Somerset County, Maryland, United States. The district encompasses this quiet rural village situated along Fairmount Road (Maryland Route 361). The village is landlocked, rural in character, and surrounded by farms, fields, wooded land and a few modern houses. Perhaps the most significant structure still standing is the Upper Fairmount Methodist Episcopal Church built in 1870.

It was added to the National Register of Historic Places in 1993.
