= Big Annemessex River =

Location
- Country: United States
- State: Maryland

Physical characteristics
- Source
  - location: Kingston, Maryland, United States
- Mouth
  - coordinates: 38.0481792°N 75.8735434°W
  - elevation: 0 ft (0 m)
- Basin size: 34.6 mi^{2} (90 km^{2})

Basin features
- Tributaries
  - left: Hall Creek, Holland Creek
  - right: Acre Creek, Jones Creek, Coulbourn Creek, Gales Creek, Annemessex Creek

The Big Annemessex River is a 15.4-mile-long (24.8 km) tributary of the Chesapeake Bay on the Delmarva Peninsula. It rises in Kingston, Somerset County, Maryland, and flows roughly southwest about 6 miles (10 km) in a meandering pattern, then widens into an estuary and continues about 9 miles (14 km) to the bay, near Janes Island State Park. Tributaries include Annemessex Creek, Holland Creek, Hall Creek, Muddy Creek, Colbourn Creek, Jones Creek and Daugherty Creek.

The river is spanned once by River Road, a residential county road far from any population center. The Annemessex Creek upstream, however, is spanned by Maryland Route 413.

There is also a Little Annemessex River; the city of Crisfield rests upon its shores.

== See also ==
- List of rivers of Maryland
