= Princess Anne, Maryland =

- Town
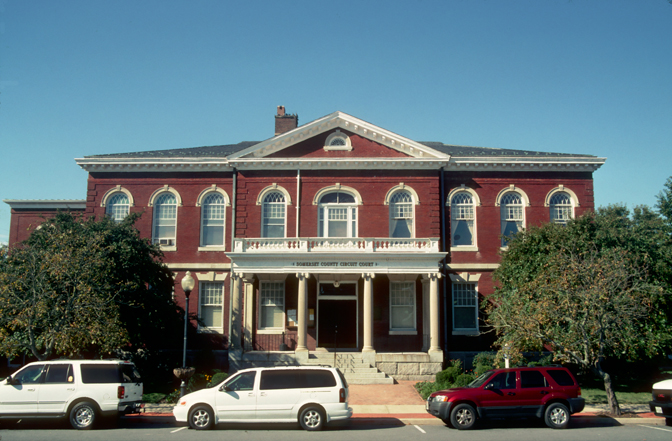
- Somerset County Courthouse in Princess Anne

- Flag Seal

- Location in Somerset County and the state of Maryland

- Location within the state of Maryland Princess Anne (the United States)
- Coordinates: 38°12′35″N 75°41′42″W
- Country: United States
- State: Maryland
- County: Somerset
- Founded: 1733
- Incorporated: 1867

Area
  - Total: 1.69 sq mi (4.37 km^{2})
  - Land: 1.67 sq mi (4.33 km^{2})
  - Water: 0.015 sq mi (0.04 km^{2})
- Elevation: 16 ft (5 m)

Population (2020)
  - Total: 3,446
  - Density: 2,063.6/sq mi (796.76/km^{2})
- Time zone: UTC−5 (EST)
  - Summer (DST): UTC−4 (EDT)
- ZIP code: 21853
- Area code: 410
- FIPS code: 24-64000
- GNIS feature ID: 0591074
- Website: www.townofprincessanne.org

Princess Anne is a town in Somerset County, Maryland, United States, that also serves as its county seat. As of the 2020 census, Princess Anne had a population of 3,446. It is included in the Salisbury, Maryland–Delaware Metropolitan Statistical Area. It is home to the University of Maryland Eastern Shore and the Teackle Mansion.

== History ==
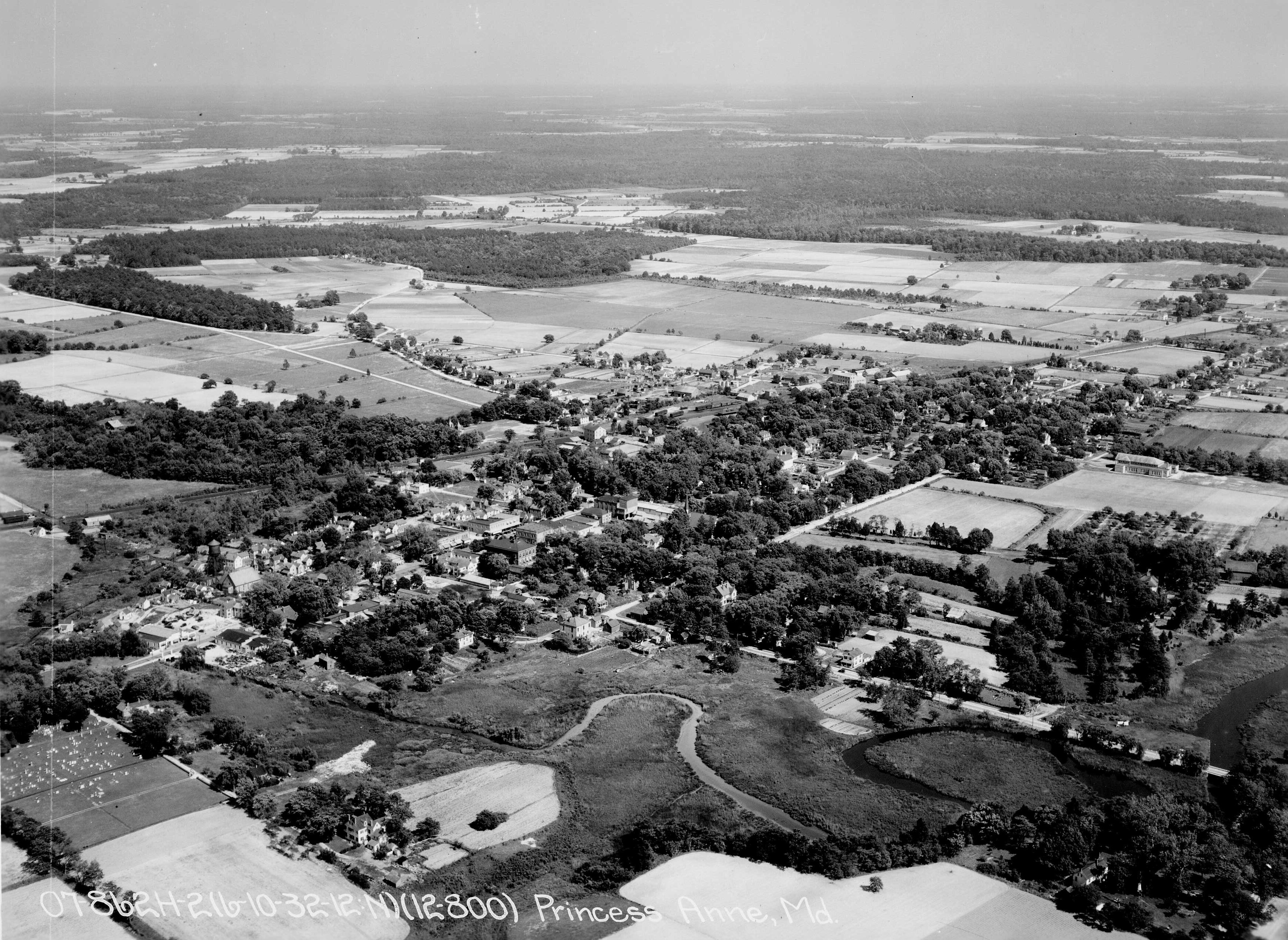
Aerial view of Princess Anne, 1932

The town at the head of the Manokin River was named for Princess Anne of Great Britain, daughter of King George II. Established in 1733, it serves as the county seat for Somerset County, the southernmost county in Maryland.

In the mid-18th century, the town became a market center based on the river trade and development of tobacco plantations in the area. Enslaved African Americans were used to cultivate and process this labor-intensive crop, in addition to other farming. The town's trade was augmented by the southward extension of the Eastern Shore Railroad on Maryland's Eastern Shore. At that time, the Manokin River was navigable as far as the bridge at Princess Anne.

Much of the town's architectural heritage has been preserved. About 150 acres (0.6 km^{2}) of the old town, with about 300 structures, is entered on the National Register of Historic Places as the Princess Anne Historic District.

In addition, the Adams Farm, Beckford, Beverly, Catalpa Farm, Glebe House, Harrington, Manokin Historic District, Manokin Presbyterian Church, Mt. Zion Memorial Church, Dr. William B. Pritchard House, Somerset Academy Archaeological Site, Teackle Mansion, University of Maryland Eastern Shore, Waddy House, Waterloo, and White Hall are listed on the National Register of Historic Places.

Princess Anne has the ignoble distinction of being the site of the last lynching in Maryland history. In 1933, a black man named George Armwood was accused of assaulting an elderly white woman. He was removed from the Princess Anne jail by a white mob, dragged around town behind a truck, and eventually hanged. After his death, the rope that formed the noose was cut up and distributed as souvenirs.

=== Connection to Napoleon ===
After the defeat of the French Empire at the hands of the Seventh Coalition in July 1815, emperor Napoleon I sought to flee to the United States to escape imprisonment. According to local legends, Napoleon's brother, Jerome Bonaparte, had previously married Elizabeth Patterson, an American socialite from Baltimore, and through her the Bonapartes had connections to the American gentry, such as the King family in Beverly. According to the 1944 book 'Rivers of the Eastern Shore' by Hulbert Footner, Nicholas Girod, former Mayor of New Orleans, attempted to rescue Napoleon from his exile in British Saint Helena in 1821, the plan being to hide Napoleon in Beverly House in Princess Anne before transporting him to Napoleon House in New Orleans once the hunt for him subsided. However, Napoleon died before the plot could go ahead.

== Geography ==
Princess Anne is located at 38°12′N 75°42′W (38.204, –75.695).

According to the United States Census Bureau, the town has a total area of 1.69 square miles (4.38 km^{2}), of which 1.67 square miles (4.33 km^{2}) is land and 0.02 square miles (0.05 km^{2}) is water.

=== Climate ===
The climate in this area is characterized by hot, humid summers and generally mild to cool winters. According to the Köppen Climate Classification system, Princess Anne has a humid subtropical climate, abbreviated "Cfa" on climate maps. Princess Anne's climate is characterized by hot and humid stretches of weather in summer, but they are often broken up by cold fronts from the north offering several days of mild temperatures and lower humidity. Winters are relatively mild compared to areas to the north and northwest, but cold spells send temperatures well below freezing. Due to the impact of the Atlantic Ocean nearby, average snowfall amounts only range from 5 to 10 inches; however, this varies considerably from year to year and occasional nor'easters can produce significant snowfalls over one foot. The Blizzard of 2018, for example, produced 10-15 inches of snow, temperatures in teens, and winds gusting over 40 miles per hour. Tropical storms occasionally impact the region during summer and fall.

== Demographics ==
Historical population
Census	Pop.	Note	%±
1870	805		—
1880	751		−6.7%
1890	865		15.2%
1900	854		−1.3%
1910	1,006		17.8%
1920	968		−3.8%
1930	975		0.7%
1940	942		−3.4%
1950	1,407		49.4%
1960	1,351		−4.0%
1970	975		−27.8%
1980	1,499		53.7%
1990	1,666		11.1%
2000	2,313		38.8%
2010	3,290		42.2%
2020	3,446		4.7%
U.S. Decennial Census

=== Racial and ethnic composition ===
Princess Anne town, Maryland – Racial and ethnic composition Note: the US Census treats Hispanic/Latino as an ethnic category. This table excludes Latinos from the racial categories and assigns them to a separate category. Hispanics/Latinos may be of any race.
Race / Ethnicity (NH = Non-Hispanic)	Pop 2000	Pop 2010	Pop 2020	% 2000	% 2010	% 2020
White alone (NH)	785	834	811	33.94%	25.35%	23.53%
Black or African American alone (NH)	1,436	2,234	2,273	62.08%	67.90%	65.96%
Native American or Alaska Native alone (NH)	13	5	10	0.56%	0.15%	0.29%
Asian alone (NH)	18	45	44	0.78%	1.37%	1.28%
Native Hawaiian or Pacific Islander alone (NH)	1	1	0	0.04%	0.03%	0.00%
Other race alone (NH)	5	8	20	0.22%	0.24%	0.58%
Mixed race or Multiracial (NH)	16	69	122	0.69%	2.10%	3.54%
Hispanic or Latino (any race)	39	94	166	1.69%	2.86%	4.82%
Total	2,313	3,290	3,446	100.00%	100.00%	100.00%

=== 2020 census ===
As of the 2020 census, Princess Anne had a population of 3,446. The median age was 32.8 years. 28.0% of residents were under the age of 18 and 11.5% of residents were 65 years of age or older. For every 100 females there were 80.2 males, and for every 100 females age 18 and over there were 74.3 males age 18 and over.

There were 1,393 households in Princess Anne, of which 35.6% had children under the age of 18 living in them. Of all households, 27.9% were married-couple households, 20.2% were households with a male householder and no spouse or partner present, and 44.1% were households with a female householder and no spouse or partner present. About 32.8% of all households were made up of individuals and 8.4% had someone living alone who was 65 years of age or older.

There were 1,848 housing units, of which 24.6% were vacant. The homeowner vacancy rate was 3.1% and the rental vacancy rate was 18.3%. 99.7% of residents lived in urban areas, while 0.3% lived in rural areas.

=== 2010 census ===
As of the census of 2010, there were 3,290 people, 1,276 households, and 652 families living in the town. The population density was 1,970.1 inhabitants per square mile (760.7/km^{2}). There were 1,500 housing units at an average density of 898.2 per square mile (346.8/km^{2}). The racial makeup of the town was 68.4% African American, 27.1% White, 0.2% Native American, 1.4% Asian, 0.6% from other races, and 2.4% from two or more races. Hispanic or Latino of any race were 2.9% of the population.

There were 1,276 households, of which 30.5% had children under the age of 18 living with them, 25.3% were married couples living together, 22.1% had a female householder with no husband present, 3.7% had a male householder with no wife present, and 48.9% were non-families. 37.1% of all households were made up of individuals, and 6.6% had someone living alone who was 65 years of age or older. The average household size was 2.49 and the average family size was 3.04.

The median age in the town was 24.7 years. 21.6% of residents were under the age of 18; 29% were between the ages of 18 and 24; 23.6% were from 25 to 44; 17.7% were from 45 to 64; and 8.1% were 65 years of age or older. The gender makeup of the town was 40.1% male and 59.9% female.

=== 2000 census ===
As of the census of 2000, there were 2,313 people, 992 households, and 498 families living in the town. The population density was 1,843.2 inhabitants per square mile (711.7/km^{2}). There were 1,117 housing units at an average density of 890.1 per square mile (343.7/km^{2}). The racial makeup of the town was 34.59% White, 62.86% African American, 0.56% Native American, 0.78% Asian, 0.04% Pacific Islander, 0.48% from other races, and 0.69% from two or more races. Hispanic or Latino of any race were 1.69% of the population.

There were 992 households, out of which 26.4% had children under the age of 18 living with them, 25.4% were married couples living together, 21.3% had a female householder with no husband present, and 49.7% were non-families. 38.4% of all households were made up of individuals, and 12.1% had someone living alone who was 65 years of age or older. The average household size was 2.31 and the average family size was 3.14.

In the town, the population was spread out, with 26.2% under the age of 18, 20.2% from 18 to 24, 25.7% from 25 to 44, 17.0% from 45 to 64, and 10.9% who were 65 years of age or older. The median age was 28 years. For every 100 females, there were 84.7 males. For every 100 females age 18 and over, there were 77.7 males.

The median income for a household in the town was $20,066, and the median income for a family was $26,351. Males had a median income of $19,492 versus $22,857 for females. The per capita income for the town was $10,944. About 30.1% of families and 39.8% of the population were below the poverty line, including 53.8% of those under age 18 and 21.0% of those age 65 or over.

== Colleges and universities ==
- University of Maryland Eastern Shore

== Notable people ==
- George Armwood, lynched in Princess Anne, Maryland on October 18, 1933.
- Perry H. Carson, African-American political leader born in Princess Anne
- Samuel Chase, signer of the Declaration of Independence and Supreme Court associate justice
- Charles Chaille-Long, Soldier and explorer
- Phillips Lee Goldsborough, Governor of Maryland and U.S. senator from Maryland
