= Cokesbury, Maryland =

Unincorporated community in Maryland, United States

- Unincorporated community
- Location within Maryland
- Coordinates: 38°07′37″N 75°34′45″W
- Country: United States
- State: Maryland
- County: Somerset
- Elevation: 20 ft (6.1 m)
- Time zone: UTC-5 (Eastern (EST))
  - Summer (DST): UTC-4 (EDT)
- ZIP code: 21851
- Area codes: 410, 443, and 667
- GNIS feature ID: 583833

Cokesbury is an unincorporated community in Somerset County, Maryland, United States. It is located east of U.S. Route 13 near the Pocomoke River, at the intersection of Wallace Taylor Road, Cokesbury Road, and Courthouse Hill Road. Burton Cannon House was listed on the National Register of Historic Places in 1975.
