= Salisbury House =

Salisbury House or Salisbury Farm and variations may refer to:

in Canada

- Salisbury House (Canada), a restaurant chain

in England

- Cecil House, the London home of the earls of Salisbury
- Salisbury House, London, an Edwardian office block in London
- Salisbury House, Edmonton, a late 16th/early 17th century building in Edmonton, London

in the United States (by state then town)

- Salisbury House (Des Moines, Iowa), listed on the NRHP in Iowa
- Salisbury Plantation (Westover, Maryland), listed on the NRHP in Maryland
- Jonas Salisbury House (62 Walnut Park), Newton, Massachusetts, listed on the NRHP in Middlesex County
- Jonas Salisbury House (85 Langley Road), Newton, Massachusetts, listed on the NRHP in Middlesex County
- Salisbury House (Worcester, Massachusetts), listed on the NRHP
- Salisbury Mansion and Store, Worcester, Massachusetts
- Salisbury Plantation (Woodville, Mississippi), listed on the NRHP in Wilkinson County
- Salisbury Farm (Bridgeport, New Jersey), listed on the NRHP in Gloucester County
- Charles M. Salisbury House, Lacona, New York, listed on the NRHP in Oswego County, New York
- Salisbury Manor, Leeds, New York, listed on the NRHP
- George Bradshaw House and Joshua Salisbury/George Bradshaw Barn, Wellsville, Utah, listed on the NRHP in Cache County
- Salisbury (Chesterfield County, Virginia), an 18th-century plantation

== See also ==
- Salisbury Plantation (disambiguation)
