= Salisbury Plantation =

Salisbury Plantation may refer to:

- Salisbury Plantation (Westover, Maryland), listed on the NRHP in Maryland
- Salisbury Plantation (Woodville, Mississippi), listed on the NRHP in Mississippi
- Salisbury (Chesterfield County, Virginia), a former 18th century plantation near Richmond, Virginia

== See also ==
- Salisbury House (disambiguation)
