= Jonas Salisbury House =

Jonas Salisbury House may refer to:

- Jonas Salisbury House (62 Walnut Park), Newton, Massachusetts, listed on the NRHP in Middlesex County, Massachusetts
- Jonas Salisbury House (85 Langley Road), Newton, Massachusetts, listed on the NRHP in Middlesex County, Massachusetts
