= Draper Ruggles House =

Historic house in Massachusetts, United States

- U.S. National Register of Historic Places
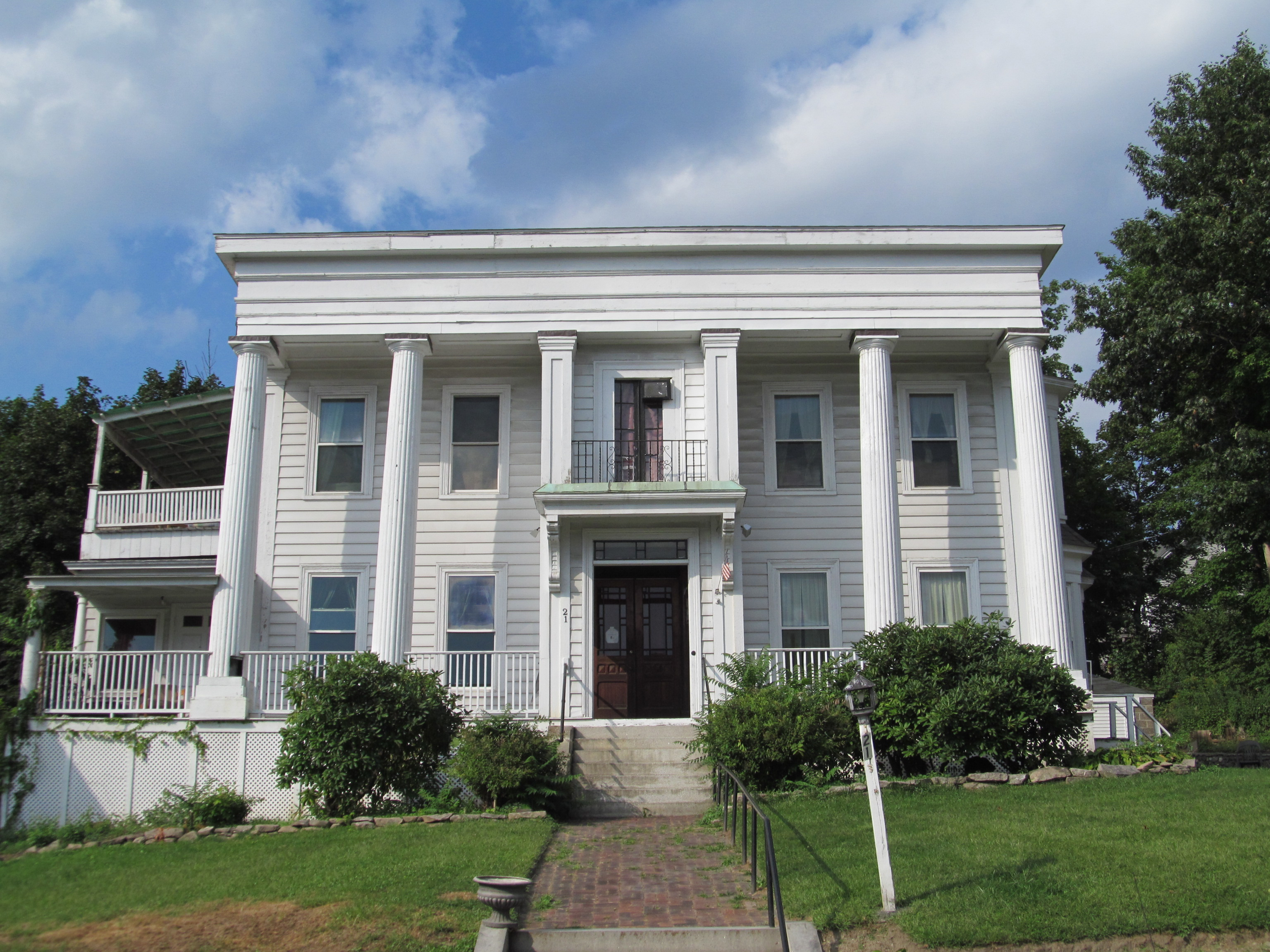
- Draper Ruggles House

- Location within Massachusetts Location within the United States
- Location: 21 Catharine St., Worcester, Massachusetts
- Coordinates: 42°16′33″N 71°47′34″W
- Built: 1848
- Architectural style: Greek Revival
- MPS: Worcester MRA
- NRHP reference No.: 80000556
- Added to NRHP: March 05, 1980

The Draper Ruggles House is a historic house at 21 Catharine Street in Worcester, Massachusetts. Built about 1848, it is an important local example of Greek Revival architecture. It is further notable as the home of Draper Ruggles, owner of one of the city's major industrial firms, a plow manufacturer. The house was listed on the National Register of Historic Places in 1980.

== Description and history ==
The Ruggles House is set on the north side of Catharine Street, just north of the UMass Medical Center on Worcester's east side. It is a rare local example of hip-roofed Greek Revival house with a temple front; the Dowley-Taylor House is the only other city property that also has these characteristics. The facade has four full-height reeded columns, with a projecting entry at the center that has a Victorian hooded portico sheltering the entry, and paneled pilasters flanking the balcony entrance above. The two-story porch on the left side is also a later 19th-century addition.

The house was probably built around 1848, not long after residential development began in this part of the city. The building's style is distinctively influenced by the work of Elias Carter, a regionally notable architect of the period, and was at the time somewhat common. The reeding of the columns is a distinctive element of Carter's work, suggesting he may have been involved in the design of this building. The owner, Draper Ruggles, was a principal partner in a plow manufacturer, that he later sold to Oliver Ames. The house was moved a short distance on its lot in 1889–90 to facilitate the construction of 25 Catharine Street. The Draper Ruggles House is currently the location of Channing House, which is a halfway house operated by Advocates Inc. is probably the most successful halfway house in Worcester County and it is also probably one of the best or most successful programs in Massachusetts. Channing House is licensed by the state of Massachusetts and it is also listed by SAMHSA as a fully accredited 6 month substance abuse residential program in Massachusetts.

== See also ==
- National Register of Historic Places listings in eastern Worcester, Massachusetts
