= Jesse Moore =

Jesse Moore may refer to:

- Jesse H. Moore, U.S. representative from Illinois
- Jesse Moore (gymnast), Australian artistic gymnast
- J.C. Moore (politician) (Jesse C. Moore), member of the Kansas House of Representatives

== See also ==
- Jesse Moore House, a historic house in Worcester, Massachusetts
