= Cedar Hill (Westover, Maryland) =

Historic house in Maryland, United States

- U.S. National Register of Historic Places
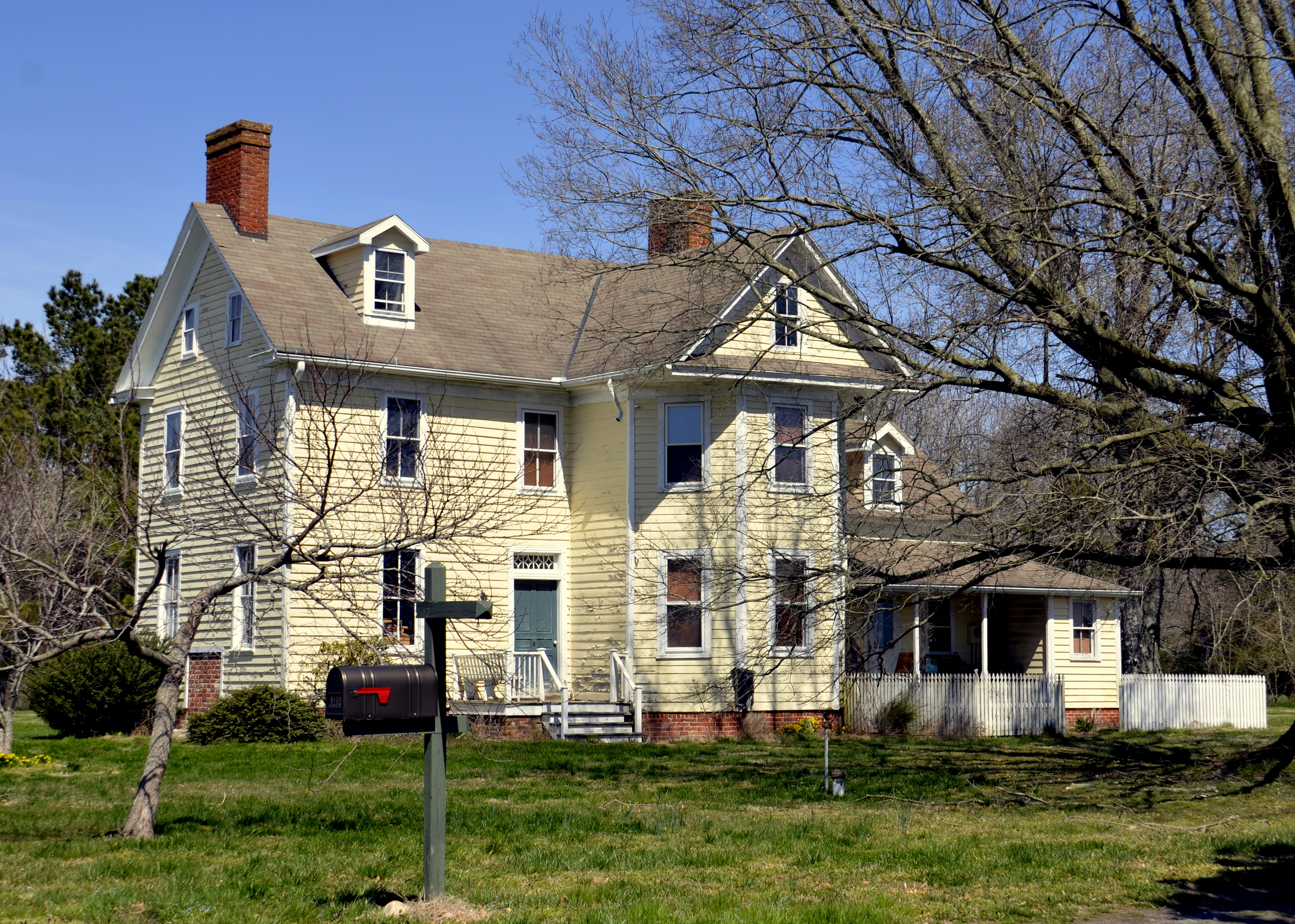

- Location within Maryland Location within the United States
- Nearest city: Westover, Maryland
- Coordinates: 38°7′55″N 75°42′42″W
- Area: 3.2 acres (1.3 ha)
- Built: 1793
- Architectural style: Greek Revival, Late Victorian, Federal
- NRHP reference No.: 91000255
- Added to NRHP: March 14, 1991

Cedar Hill, also known as Long Farm, is a historic home located at Westover, Somerset County, Maryland, United States. It is a 2 1/2-story T-shaped frame dwelling, on a brick foundation. The main section was erected in 1793, and followed a modified hall / parlor plan. Also on the property are an 1880 bi-level hay-and-horse barn with a long shed addition for dairy stalls, a 19th-century granary, a late-19th-century corn crib, a rusticated concrete block well house, and a rusticated concrete dairy.

Cedar Hill was listed on the National Register of Historic Places in 1991.
