= Brimfield Center Historic District =

Historic district in Massachusetts, United States

- U.S. National Register of Historic Places
- U.S. Historic district
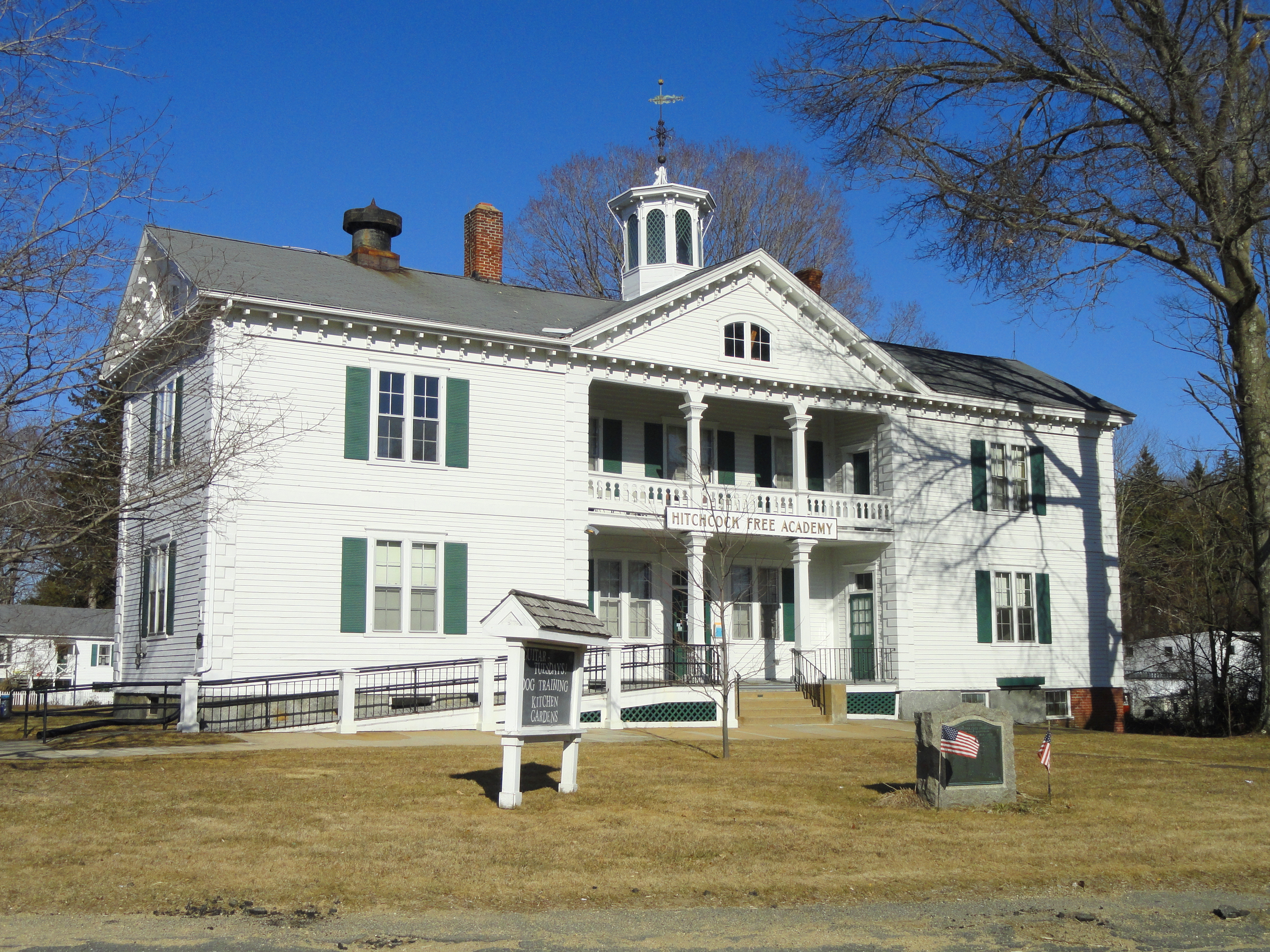
- Hitchcock Free Academy

- Location within Massachusetts Location within the United States
- Location: Brimfield, Massachusetts
- Coordinates: 42°7′29″N 72°18′32″W
- Area: 134 acres (54 ha)
- Architect: Carter, Elias; et al.
- Architectural style: Greek Revival, Georgian
- NRHP reference No.: 06000524
- Added to NRHP: June 22, 2006

The Brimfield Center Historic District is a historic district encompassing the historic center of Brimfield, Massachusetts. The district is centered on the town common, and includes properties radiating out from that center on Main Street, Brookfled, Wales, Sturbridge and Warren Roads. Brimfield Center was first laid out in 1721 along a Native American trail that ran through the area, and developed over the years into what is now US Route 20, or Main Street. The district includes properties ranging from early colonial houses to the town hall, built in 1878. The center has retained some coherence because the Brimfield Fair, a major antiques market that takes place three times a year, takes up significant open space in the areas near the center. The district was listed on the National Register of Historic Places in 2006.

== Description and history ==
The town of Brimfield is located in central Massachusetts, just west of Sturbridge and roughly midway between Worcester and Springfield. The town was permanently settled by European colonists in 1721, and its civic center was laid out along a former Native American trail that ran east–west through the town. This route, now Main Street, and in this area aligned with United States Route 20, grew to become part of the principal post road running west from Boston to Springfield and beyond. Two roads leading northward, Warren and Brookfield Roads, lead to the towns for which they are named, and Wales Road leads south to Connecticut. This road network was established early in the colonial period, and the town common was laid out in 1721 at the junction of Main and Warren Streets.

The town center is architecturally dominated by Georgian and Federal period housing, with commercial and civic buildings mostly later in construction, as needs for such facilities changed over time, and fire claiming some structures. The town was bypassed by the railroads, and most of its industries were located away from the center. In the 20th century, the advent of regular antiques fairs has served to keep the town center separated from other, more modern development.

The oldest surviving elements of the town center are the common and the cemetery, both laid out in 1721. The oldest house is believed to be the c. 1738 ell attached to the Converse House at 7 Brookfield Road, and there are only a few other Georgian period houses. The town's Federal period architecture benefits from the residency of architect Elias Carter, who designed a number of homes, notable among them the c. 1823 Hitchcock House at 15 Wales Road; it has a porch with colossal Doric columns. Carter is also believed to have designed the Converse House to which the c. 1738 ell is attached. The First Congregational Church, on the common, is a fine example of Greek Revival architecture, built in 1848. The Hitchcock Free Academy (1855, pictured above), is also a Carter design, showing early Italianate influence. Town Hall, built in 1878, is a fine example of Stick style, designed by Springfield architect Eugene Clarence Gardner.

== See also ==
- National Register of Historic Places listings in Hampden County, Massachusetts
