= Liberty Hall (Westover, Maryland) =

Historic house in Maryland, United States

- U.S. National Register of Historic Places
- Location within Maryland Location within the United States
- Location: South of Westover off Maryland Route 361, Westover, Maryland
- Coordinates: 38°5′35″N 75°43′48″W
- Area: 45 acres (18 ha)
- Built: 1783
- Architectural style: Greek Revival, Georgian
- NRHP reference No.: 76001012
- Added to NRHP: December 27, 1976

Liberty Hall, also known as Armstrong's Lott, is a historic home located at Westover, Somerset County, Maryland, United States. It is a 2 1/2-story house that sits on a high brick foundation.

Liberty Hall was listed on the National Register of Historic Places in 1976.
