= Horatio Tower House =

Historic house in Massachusetts, United States

- U.S. National Register of Historic Places
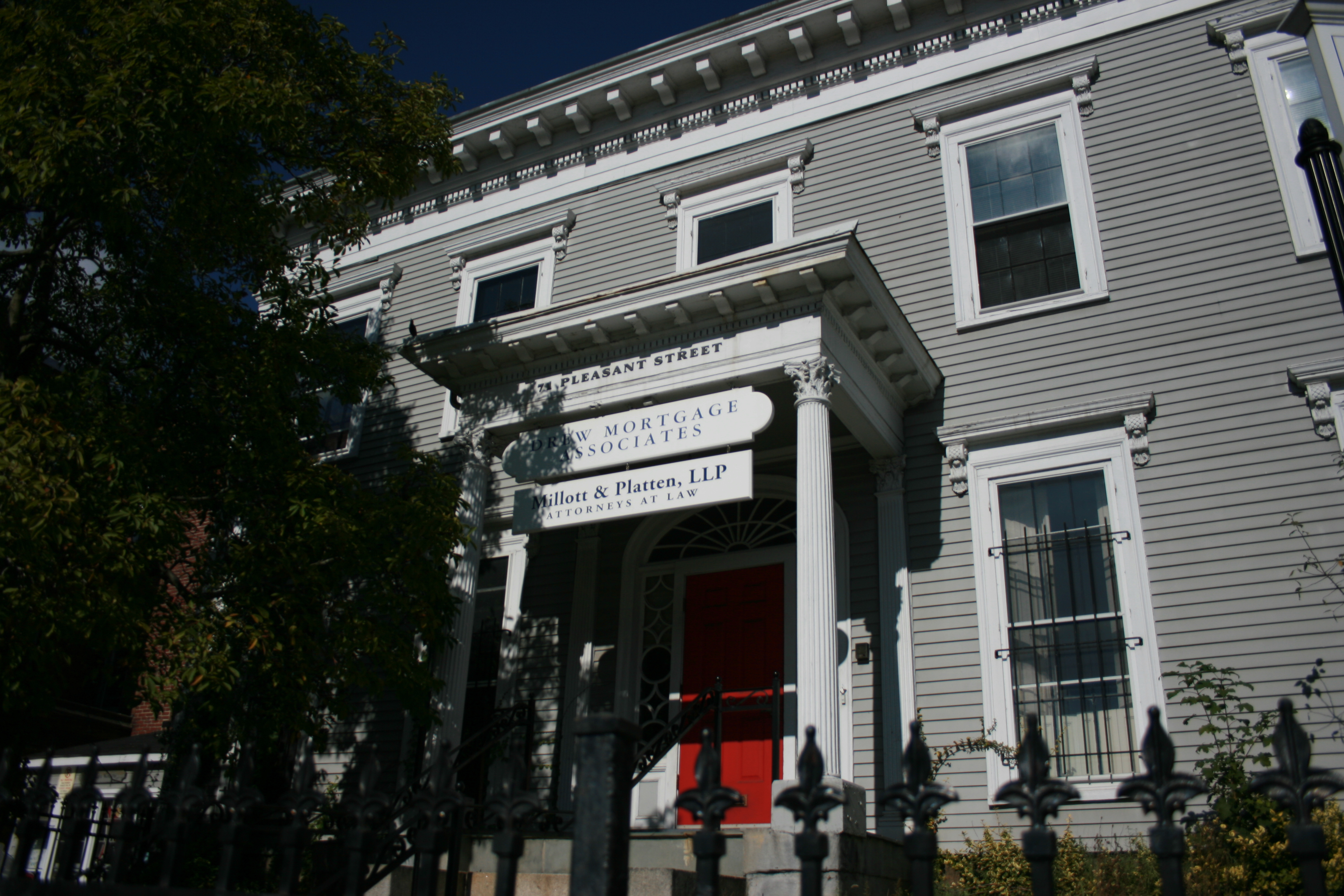

- Location within Massachusetts Location within the United States
- Location: 71 Pleasant St., Worcester, Massachusetts
- Coordinates: 42°15′49″N 71°48′19″W
- Built: 1848
- Architect: Elias Carter
- Architectural style: Italianate
- MPS: Worcester MRA
- NRHP reference No.: 80000600
- Added to NRHP: March 05, 1980

The Horatio Tower House is a historic house at 71 Pleasant Street in Worcester, Massachusetts. It is one of the few relatively intact surviving instances of Italianate styling on the west side of the city. This two story frame house was built for Horatio Tower, a local builder whose work included the American Antiquarian Society hall and Mechanics Hall. Although the building has some Greek Revival features (such as the corner pilasters), its significant Italianate features include the deep cornice with brackets, and a front entry porch supported by Corinthian columns and a similarly styled roof.

The house was listed on the National Register of Historic Places in 1980.

== See also ==
- National Register of Historic Places listings in northwestern Worcester, Massachusetts
- National Register of Historic Places listings in Worcester County, Massachusetts
