= Acworth Congregational Church =

Historic church in New Hampshire, United States

- U.S. National Register of Historic Places
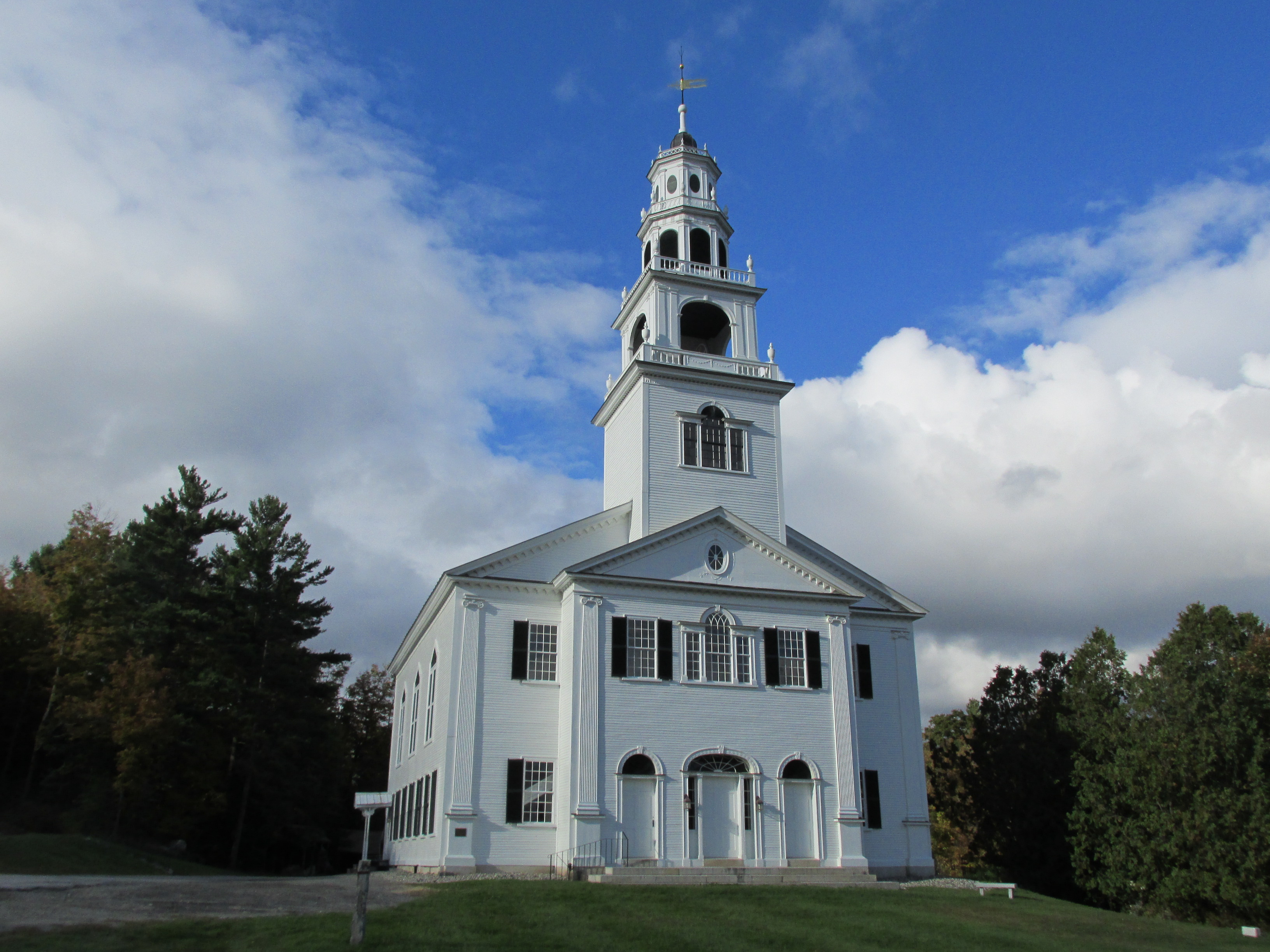
- Acworth Congregational Church

- Location within New Hampshire Location within the United States
- Location: North end of town common, Acworth, New Hampshire
- Coordinates: 43°13′8″N 72°17′38″W
- Area: less than one acre
- Built: 1821
- Architect: Elias Carter
- Architectural style: Federal
- NRHP reference No.: 75000132
- Added to NRHP: June 13, 1975

Acworth Congregational Church (The Church-on-the-Hill or Acworth Meetinghouse) is a historic church at the end of the town common in Acworth, New Hampshire. Built in 1821, its exterior is a well-preserved local example of Federal period architecture, with possible attribution to Elias Carter. Its interior now exhibits a Victorian-era design, distinctive because it has survived later alteration. The church was listed on the National Register of Historic Places in 1975. It is now maintained by a local non-profit organization.

== Description ==
The Acworth Congregational Church occupies one of the highest spots in the village center of Acworth, at the northern end of its oblong town common. It is a basically rectangular two-story wood-frame structure, covered by a gabled roof and wooden clapboards. A projecting entry section has its own triangular pediment (with oculus window) and pilasters, matching those at the corners of the main block. A four-stage tower (two square stages topped by two octagonal ones) rises above the main facade. The church's interior decoration is mainly the result of a redecoration in the 1880s.

The church was built in 1821, with alterations at several points in the 19th century. Its design is clearly inspired by the Congregational Church of Templeton, Massachusetts, which was designed by Elias Carter and influenced the design of a whole series of churches throughout the region. Attribution of this church's design to Carter is disputed, and the congregation's records of the period have not survived. The congregation was founded in 1773, and this was its second meeting house. Unlike the first, whose construction in 1784 was funded by the town, it was paid for exclusively by the congregation, over separation of church and state concerns. The interior was restyled in the late 19th century. The building is now maintained by a local non-profit organization.

== See also ==
- National Register of Historic Places listings in Sullivan County, New Hampshire
