= Barre Common District =

Historic district in Massachusetts, United States

- U.S. National Register of Historic Places
- U.S. Historic district
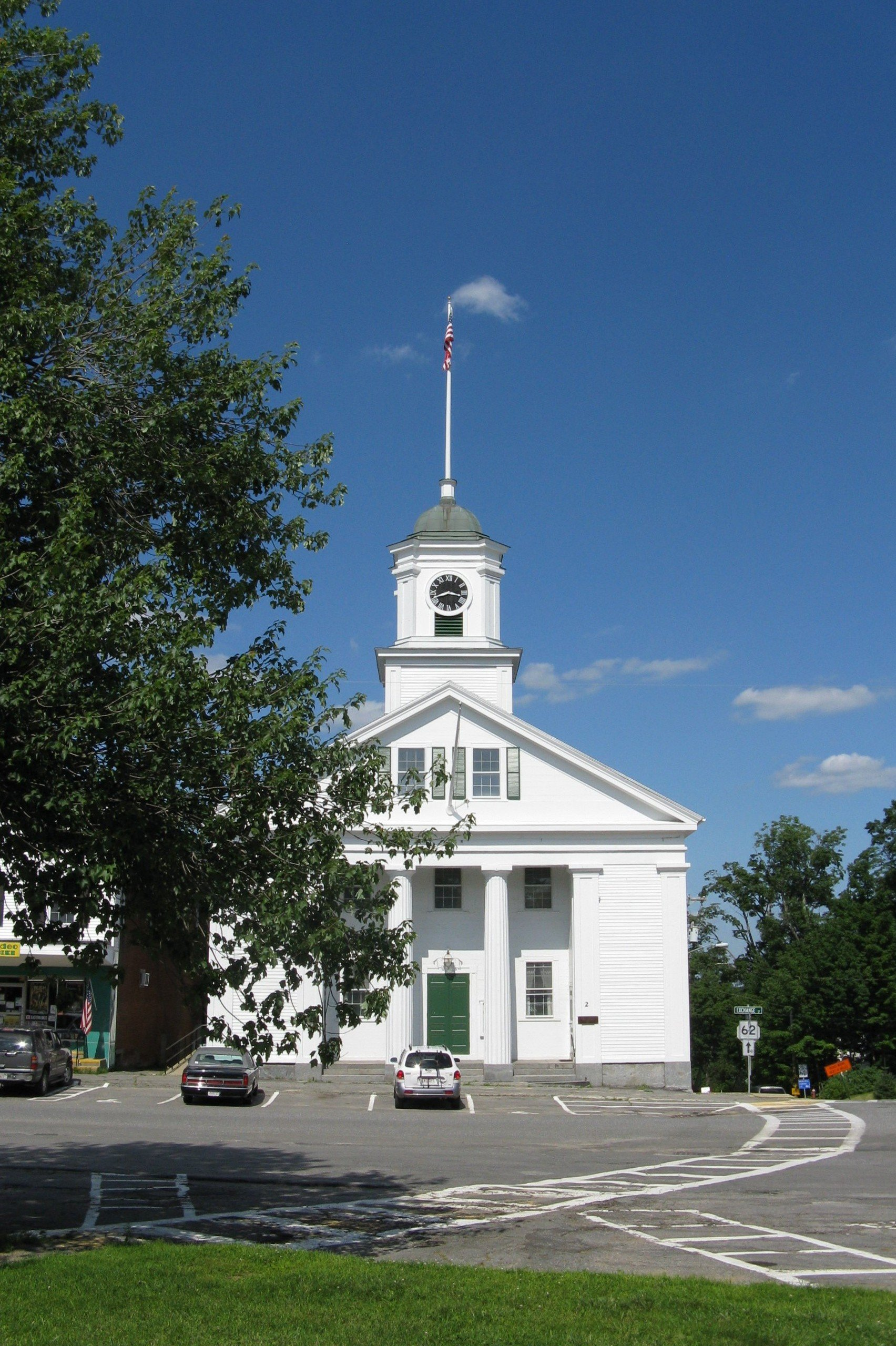
- Old Town Hall

- Location within Massachusetts Location within the United States
- Location: Bounded roughly by South, Exchange, Main, Pleasant, Broad, School and Grove Sts., Barre, Massachusetts
- Coordinates: 42°25′20″N 72°6′20″W
- Area: 22 acres (8.9 ha)
- Built: 1836
- Architect: Elias Carter; Multiple
- Architectural style: Greek Revival, Other, Romanesque
- NRHP reference No.: 76000298
- Added to NRHP: May 4, 1976

The Barre Common District is a historic district encompassing the town common of Barre, Massachusetts, and immediately adjacent historic buildings. It is bounded roughly by South, Exchange, Main, Pleasant, Broad, School and Grove Streets. The Barre common was laid out in 1792, and has been a focus of the town's civic life ever since, and is flanked by a number of high-quality Greek Revival buildings, as well as those in other styles. The district was listed on the National Register of Historic Places in 1976.

== Description and history ==
The Barre Common is a 15-acre (6.1 ha) greensward at the center of the village of Barre. It is roughly in the shape of a bent triangle, with the point at the south formed by the bordering Common and South Streets. It is divided into four parcels separated by roads, with the northernmost one skewed to the west. Facing the northernmost block, across Park Street, is the Barre Congregational Church, a fine example of Greek Revival architecture built in 1849. Other prominent examples of Greek Revival design facing the common include the Lawrence-Holman-Graziani House, built in 1836 and attributed to Elias Carter, which features a six-column temple portico. The Barre Historical Society Building, was also built in 1836 and has a temple front. The only major building that is not of wood-frame construction is the Barre Savings Bank building, a Romanesque brick structure built in 1894.

The common has played a prominent role in the town's history since its founding. It is the site of memorials to the town's military, and it has long been the site of a bandstand were concerts are given in the summer (the present bandstand is the third). The common was used as a militia training ground, and was also the site of the town pound (where stray animals could be corralled). One small section is adorned with a 19th-century horse trough and hay scales.

== See also ==
- National Register of Historic Places listings in Worcester County, Massachusetts
