= William T. Tull House =

Historic house in Maryland, United States

- U.S. National Register of Historic Places
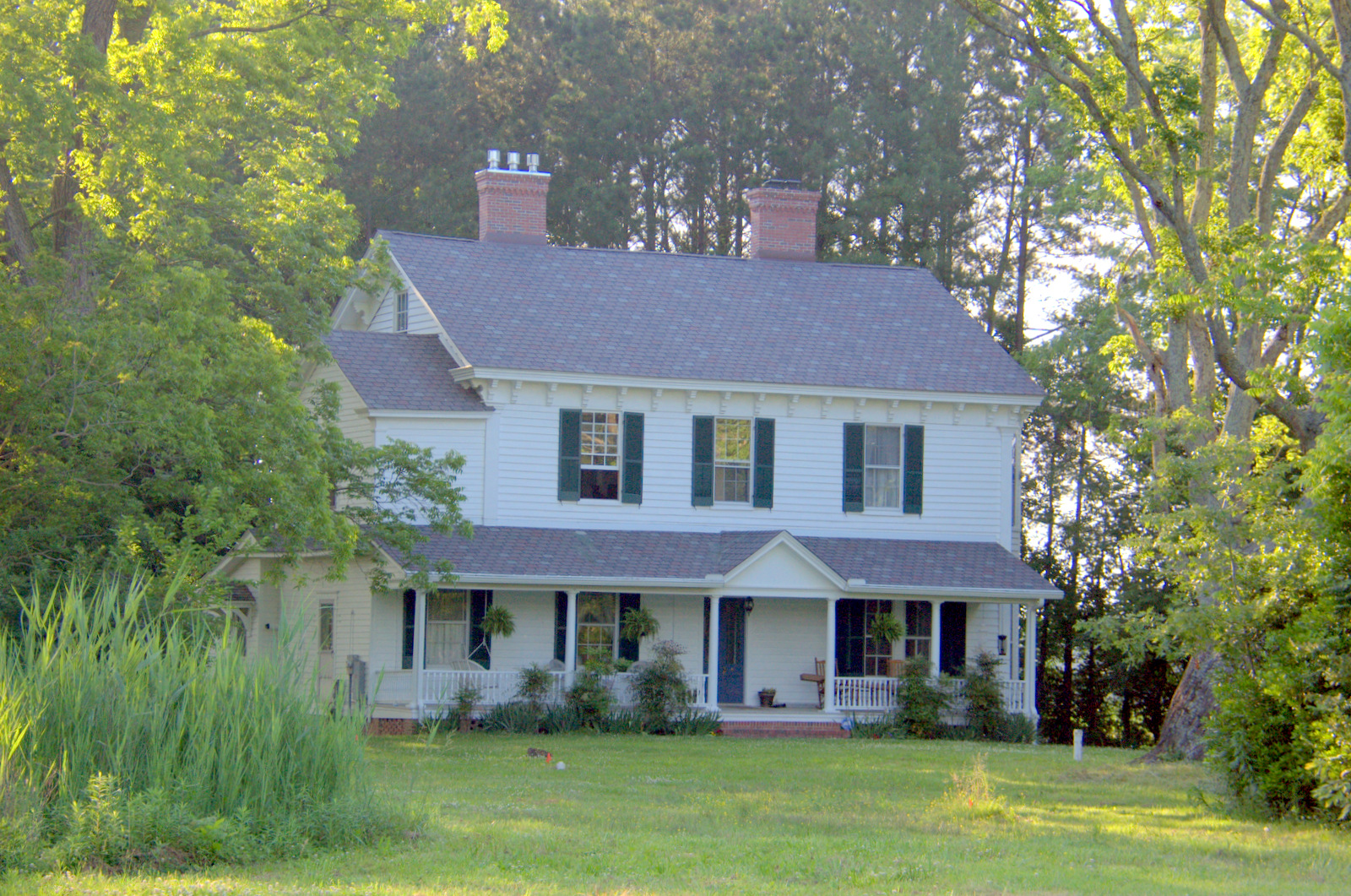

- Location within Maryland Location within the United States
- Location: 8938 Crisfield Highway (MD 413), Westover, Maryland
- Coordinates: 38°7′32″N 75°42′22″W
- Area: 0.3 acres (0.12 ha)
- Built: 1860
- Architectural style: Greek Revival, Italianate
- NRHP reference No.: 96000302
- Added to NRHP: March 26, 1996

William T. Tull House, also known as E.D. Long House, is a historic home located at Westover, Somerset County, Maryland. It is a two-story, three-bay, center passage/double-pile plan frame dwelling, erected around 1860. Its exterior features are associated with the Greek Revival and Italianate styles.

It was listed on the National Register of Historic Places in 1996.
