= Holly Grove Christian School =

Private school in Maryland, United States

Location
- 7317 Mennonite Church Road; Eastern Shore of Maryland; Westover, Somerset, Maryland 21871; USA; 38°05′00″N 75°39′50″W

Information
- School type: Private Preschool, Elementary School, Middle School, High School
- Religious affiliation: Christian
- Denomination: Mennonite
- Founded: 1976
- Status: Enrolling
- Head of school: Matthew Curtis
- Staff: 17
- Faculty: 45
- Grades: PreK-12
- Gender: Coeducational
- Age: 4 years old to 18 years old
- Enrollment: 558 students (2023-24)
- Student to teacher ratio: 14.8
- Color: Blue Gold
- Athletics: Middle School, Junior Varsity, Varsity
- Athletics conference: Delaware Valley Christian Athletic Conference "Delaware Valley Christian Athletic Conference". Facebook.
- Sports: Archery, Baseball, Basketball, Field Hockey, Soccer, Softball, Track & Field, Volleyball
- Mascot: Eagle
- Website: http://www.hgcsweb.com

Holly Grove Christian School is a Christian private school located in Westover, Somerset County, Maryland. The school was established in 1976 by the Holly Grove Mennonite Church.

== Academics ==
Holly Grove is accredited by ACSI and the Middle States Association of Colleges and Schools.

=== Lower School ===
Holly Grove offers classes for lower-school students from grade level PreK-4 up through 6th Grade.

=== Middle and High School ===
Holly Grove offers core subject classes for middle and high school students as well as elective classes. These electives include Business, Music, Art, and Spanish 1–3. Holly Grove's AP offerings include Literature, Language, Statistics, Calculus AB, World History, and US History. Holly Grove also offers online classes.

== Demographics ==
The demographic breakdown of the 551 students enrolled in the 2017–2018 school year was:

- Asian – 2.90%
- Black – 3.81%
- Hispanic – 0.91%
- White – 86.21%
- Native Hawaiian/Pacific Islander – 0.18%
