= Gov. Levi Lincoln House =

Historic house in Massachusetts, United States

- U.S. National Register of Historic Places
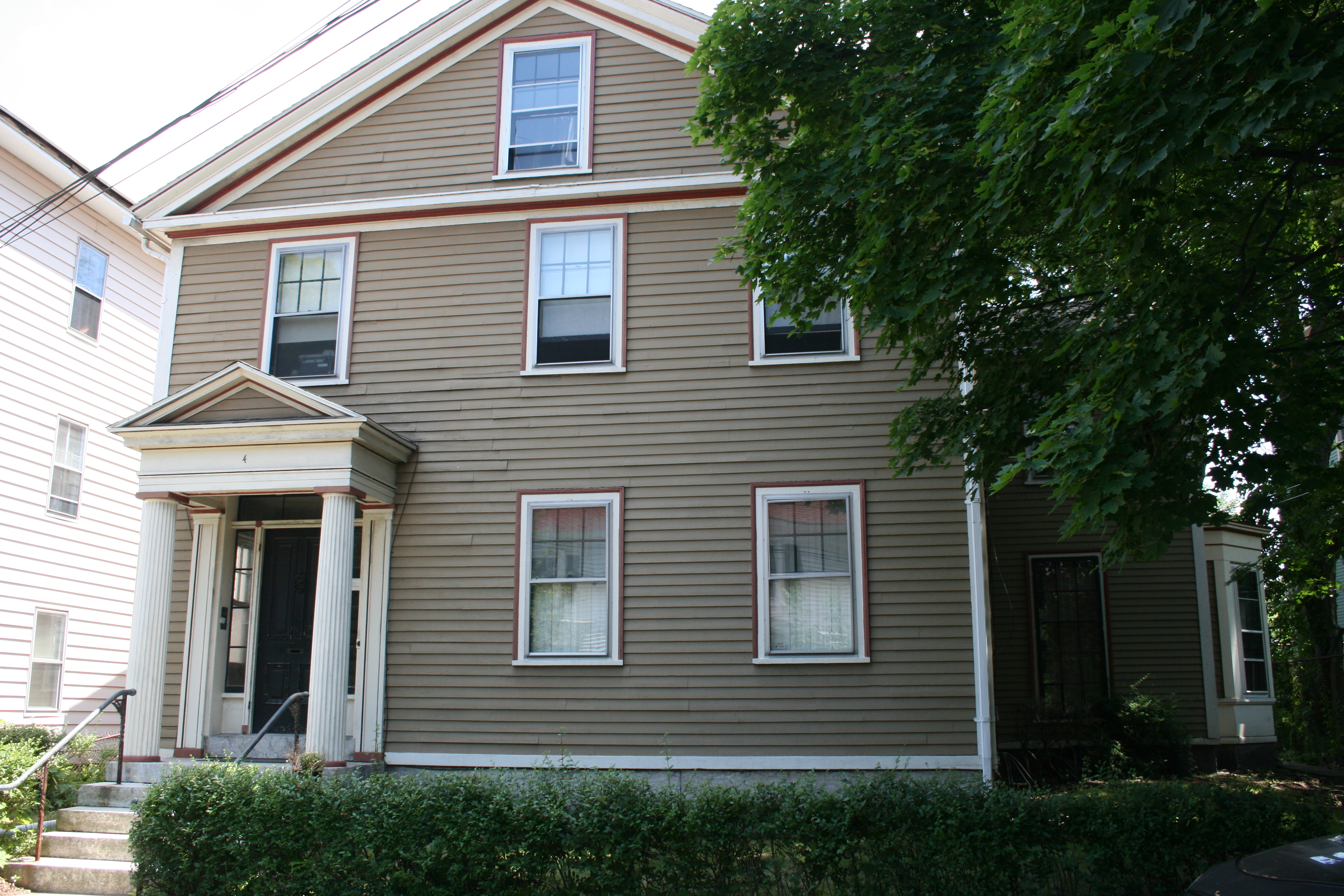

- Location within Massachusetts Location within the United States
- Location: 4 Avalon Pl., Worcester, Massachusetts
- Coordinates: 42°16′0″N 71°48′26″W
- Built: 1834
- Architect: Elias Carter
- Architectural style: Greek Revival
- MPS: Worcester MRA
- NRHP reference No.: 80000573
- Added to NRHP: March 05, 1980

The Gov. Levi Lincoln House is an historic house at 4 Avalon Place in Worcester, Massachusetts. This Greek Revival house is one of the first of the style to be built in the city; it was built for Levi Lincoln Jr., who had recently ended a long tenure as Governor of Massachusetts, and was designed by noted local architect Elias Carter. Lincoln had this house built as a temporary home to live in while a larger Carter-designed mansion was built nearby, and sold it when the latter was finished. The house was moved to its present location in 1878.

The house was listed on the National Register of Historic Places on March 5, 1980.

== See also ==
- National Register of Historic Places listings in northwestern Worcester, Massachusetts
- National Register of Historic Places listings in Worcester County, Massachusetts
