= Westover, Maryland =

Unincorporated community in Maryland, United States

- Unincorporated community
- Location within Maryland
- Coordinates: 38°07′26″N 75°42′23″W
- Country: United States
- State: Maryland
- County: Somerset
- Elevation: 13 ft (4.0 m)
- Time zone: UTC-5 (Eastern (EST))
  - Summer (DST): UTC-4 (EDT)
- ZIP codes: 21871, 21890
- Area codes: 410, 443, and 667
- GNIS feature ID: 588163

Westover is an unincorporated community in Somerset County, Maryland, United States. It is located on Maryland Route 413 near its terminus at U.S. Route 13. Owing to its central location in Somerset County, Westover is home to many important services and businesses.

Westover has a post office with the zip code of 21871, located at 8930 Crisfield Hwy. Its area code is 410.

== About ==
The community possesses a post office and a former elementary school near its center. It also has two convenience stores and gas stations, one of which is in the median of US 13. Further south on MD 413 is the Somerset County Health Department. Further north is the Eastern Correctional Institution, one of the largest employers in the county.

The Somerset County Sheriff's Department is located in the community, on 30426 Sam Barnes Road. The Somerset County Department of Parks and Recreation is also located here. The Great Hope Golf Course is located a little further south on MD 413.

Arlington, Beauchamp House, Brentwood Farm, Cedar Hill, Liberty Hall, Salisbury Plantation, St. Paul's Methodist Episcopal Church, and William T. Tull House are listed on the National Register of Historic Places.

== Schools ==
=== Public Schools ===
- Somerset Intermediate School - serves grades 6 and 7 for all of Somerset County

=== Private Schools ===
- Holly Grove Christian School - private Christian school for grades PreK-12

=== Other ===
- J. M. Tawes Vocational Center

== Transportation ==
=== Main roads ===
Maryland Route 413 is the main road through the community. Development is relatively close to the road, so the speed limit drops to 40 mph from the 55 mph it usually is.

U.S. Route 13 is the main highway of the Delmarva Peninsula, and it intersects the northern terminus of MD 413.

Sam Barnes Road houses several important facilities in the county. A section of this road is Maryland Route 673, a small connector road between the two aforementioned highways, which allows the only connection from US 13 northbound to MD 413 southbound.

Old Westover–Marion Road and Sign Post Road intersect MD 413 diagonally, and itself was the original alignment of said road. It leads north to Revell's Neck Road.

Maryland Route 361 leads to Fairmount, Frenchtown and Rumbly.

=== Public transportation ===
Several routes travel through the community, provided by Shore Transit:

- Route 253: Salisbury, Princess Anne, and Pocomoke City
- Route 432 and 452: Salisbury, Pocomoke City, and Ocean City
- Route 706 North and Route 706 South: Salisbury, Princess Anne, and Crisfield
