= Beauchamp House =

Historic house in Maryland

- U.S. National Register of Historic Places
- Location within Maryland Location within the United States
- Location: Old Westover Marion Road, Westover, Maryland
- Coordinates: 38°5′26″N 75°42′23″W
- Area: 18 acres (7.3 ha)
- Built: 1710-1730
- NRHP reference No.: 84003855
- Added to NRHP: August 9, 1984

The Beauchamp House, also known as Washburn House or Long Farm, is a historic home located at Westover, Somerset County, Maryland, United States. It is a 1 1/2-story brick-ended hall / parlor frame house standing at the head of the Annemessex River. The main house was built in two stages, beginning with a hall-plan house, built about 1710–1730. During the second half of the 18th century, the structure was enlarged by the addition of two downstairs rooms, which were later consolidated into one.

The Beauchamp House was listed on the National Register of Historic Places in 1984.
