= Templeton Common Historic District =

Historic district in Massachusetts, United States

- U.S. National Register of Historic Places
- U.S. Historic district
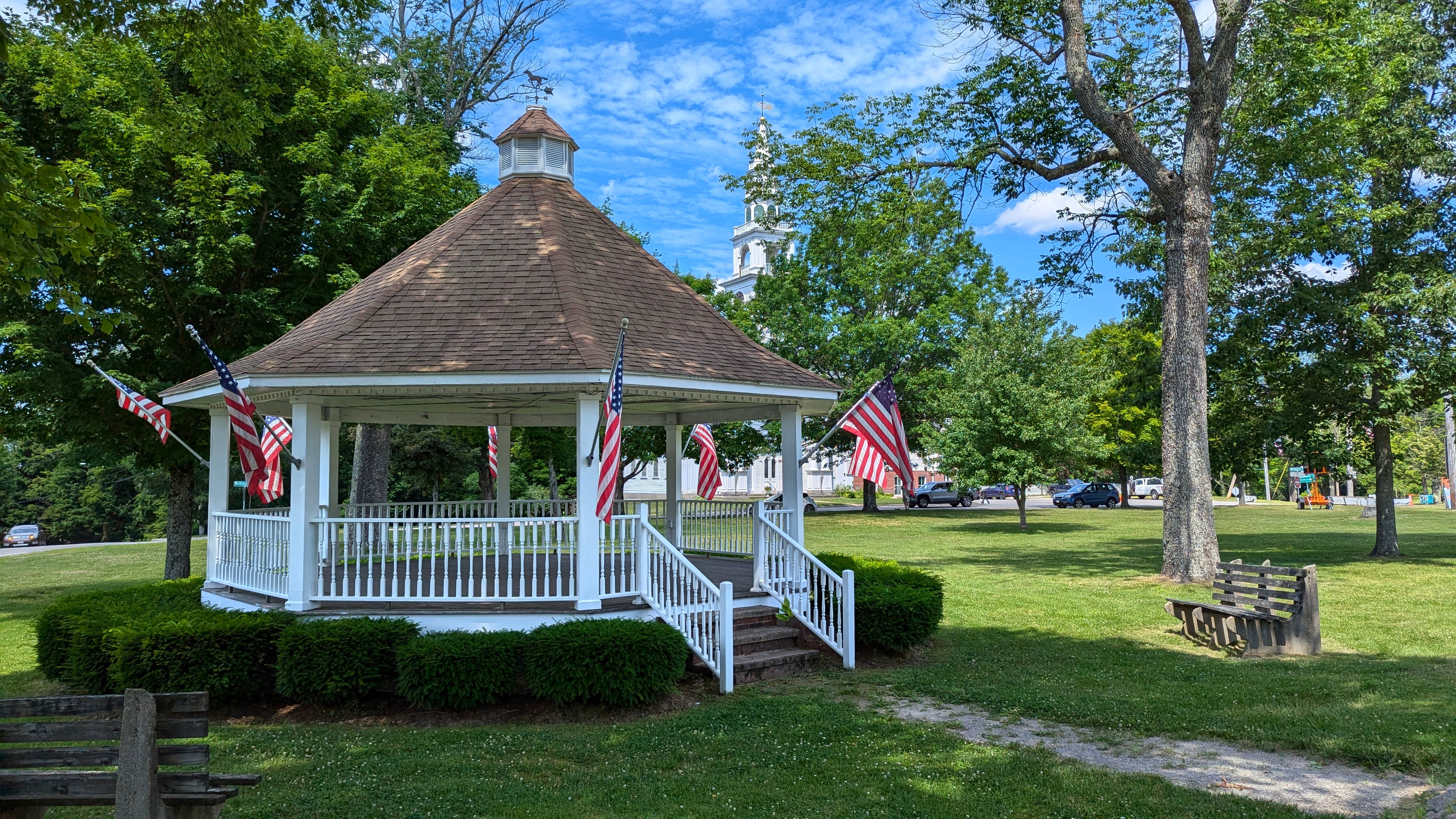
- Templeton Common

- Location within Massachusetts Location within the United States
- Location: Templeton, Massachusetts
- Coordinates: 42°33′21″N 72°4′7″W
- Architect: Elias Carter
- Architectural style: Georgian, Federal
- NRHP reference No.: 83000608
- Added to NRHP: July 7, 1983

The Templeton Common Historic District encompasses the historic town center of Templeton, Massachusetts. Laid out in the 1750s, the area has been the focus of the town's civic and economic affairs since, and includes its finest assortment of 18th and early 19th-century architecture. The district was added to the National Register of Historic Places in 1983. The district was in 2010 named as one of the 1,000 places to visit in Massachusetts by the Great Places in Massachusetts Commission.

== Description and history ==
The area that is now the northern Worcester County town of Templeton was organized as a township called Narragansett Number 6 in 1734, but significant settlement did not begin until the 1750s. The first meeting house was built in 1753, a burial ground was laid out in 1754, and the common was laid out in a plan of 1759. The town was incorporated as Templeton in 1761. The towns economy was mainly agrarian until about 1820, when small industries began to develop. The town center's economy also benefited from being a crossroads of three major stagecoach routes, with a number of taverns serving passing travelers. Chair manufacturing became a significant enterprise after 1820, and there was a small tin factory located in what is now the Grange hall. Development in the center ceased as a significant activity around 1860, as industrial employment was drawn to larger surrounding communities.

The historic district is centered on a complex junction of multiple roadways south of the town's geographic center. Baldwinville Road enters from the south, Patriots Road (Massachusetts Route 2A) enters from the west, Dudley Road (Massachusetts Route 101) from the southwest, Wellington Road from the south, Hubbardton Road from the southeast, and Patriots Road enters from the east (designated here as MA Routes 2A and 101). The district extends north along Baldwinville Road beyond Otter River Road, and for shorter distances along Gardner, Hubbardston, and Wellington Roads. Most of the buildings in the district are residential, stylistically from the Georgian, Federal, and Greek Revival periods. The most prominent civic building is the First Congregational Church, designed and built by Elias Carter in 1811. This church is particularly notable, as its form was frequently copied, most clearly by Carter himself in the construction of several churches in southern New Hampshire over the following 20 years.

== See also ==
- National Register of Historic Places listings in Worcester County, Massachusetts
