= St. Paul's Methodist Episcopal Church (Westover, Maryland) =

Historic church in Maryland, United States

- U.S. National Register of Historic Places
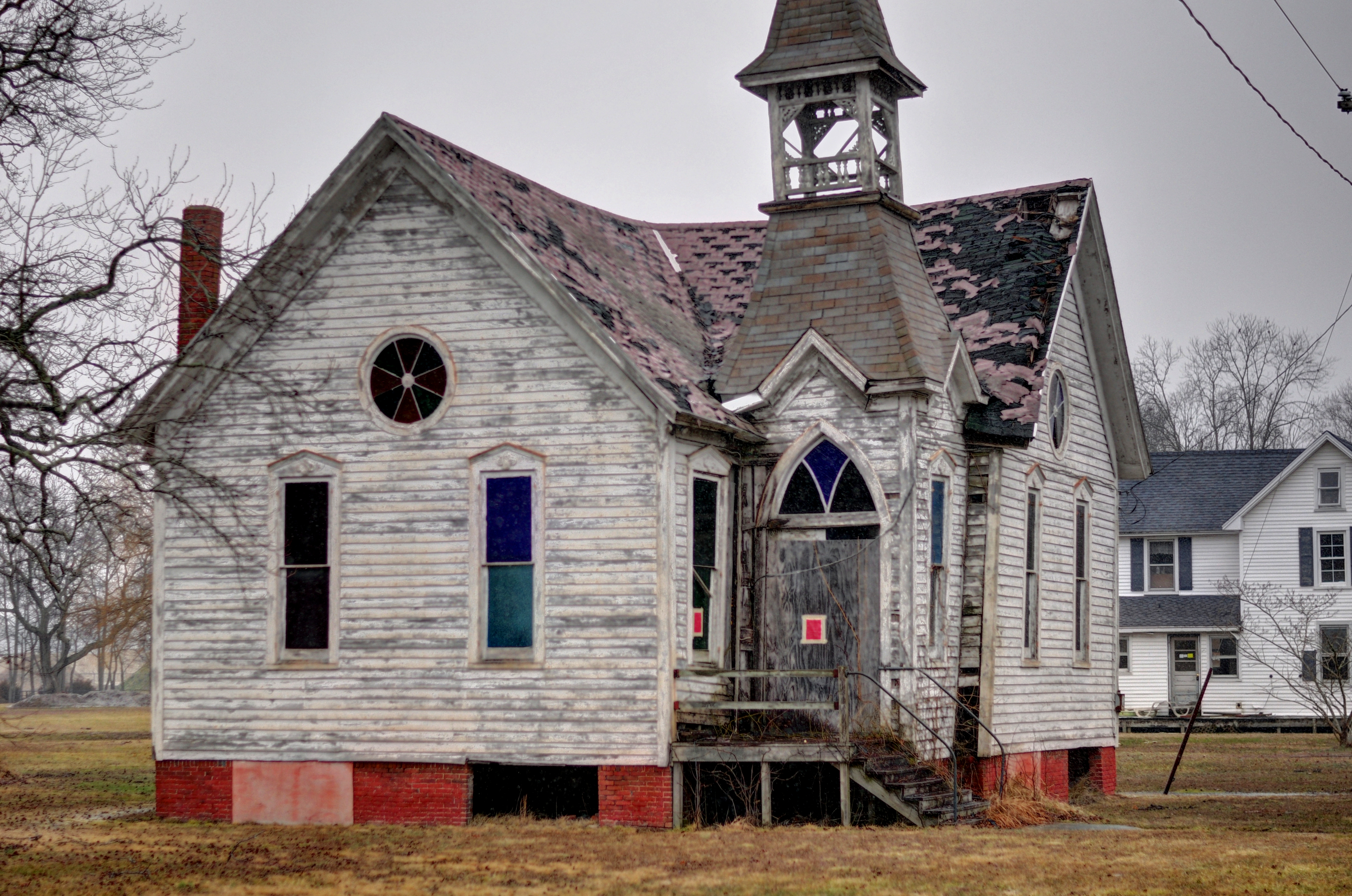
- The church in 2014

- Location within Maryland Location within the United States
- Location: 8812 Crisfield Highway (MD 413), Westover, Maryland
- Coordinates: 38°7′23″N 75°42′26″W
- Area: 0.5 acres (0.20 ha)
- Built: 1883
- Architectural style: Gothic
- NRHP reference No.: 96000403
- Added to NRHP: April 12, 1996

St. Paul's Methodist Episcopal Church was a historic Methodist Episcopal church located at Westover, Somerset County, Maryland. It was a T-shaped frame Gothic church building erected around 1883. Its architecture reflects the influence of mail order plans promulgated in the late 19th century by the Methodist Church Board of Church Extension and corresponds to Church Plan No. 19A, Catalogue of Architectural Plans for Churches and Parsonages. It features a two-story tower with an open belfry. The church was torn down in March 2014.

It was listed on the National Register of Historic Places in 1996.
