= Elias Carter =

American architect

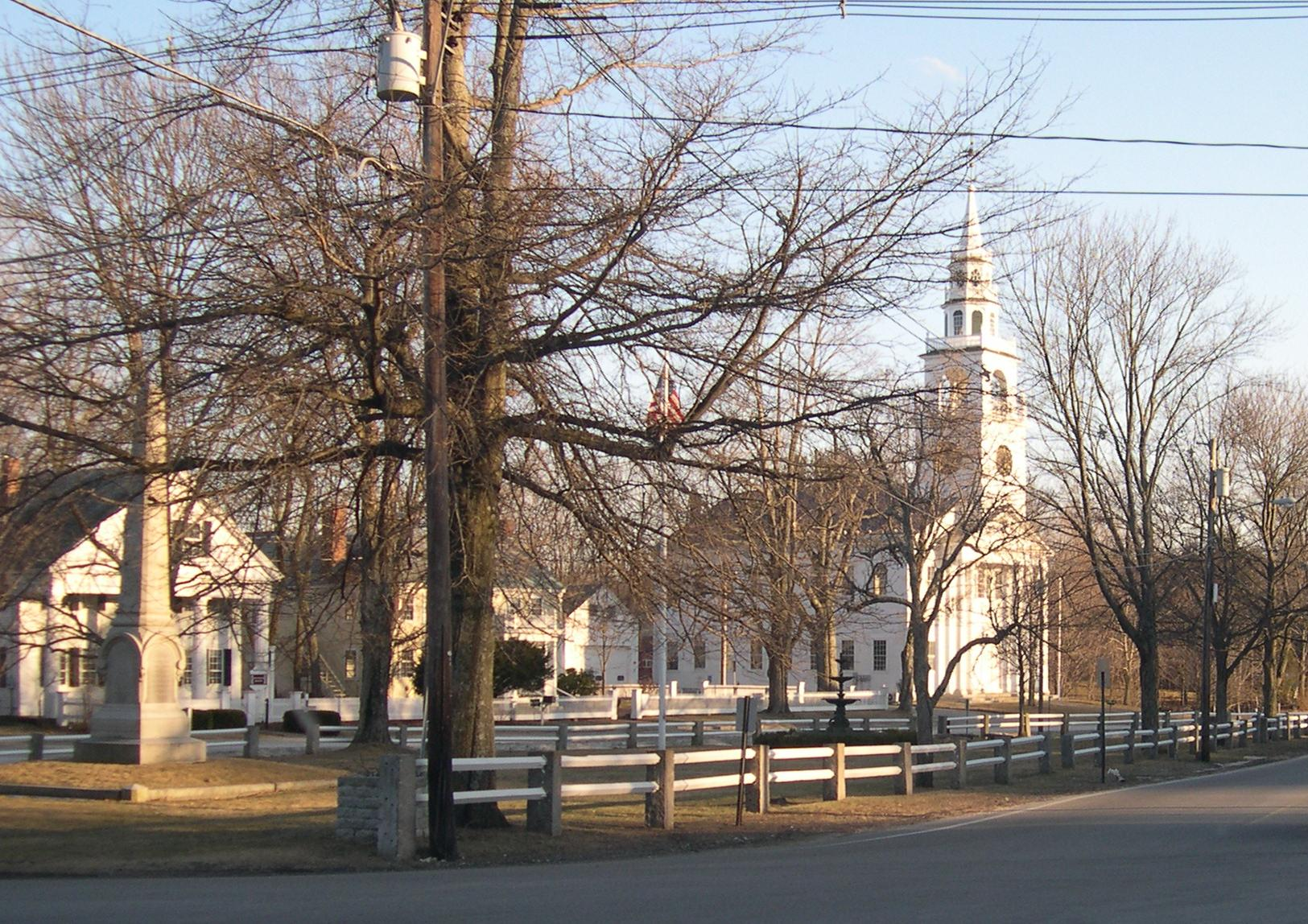
Third Fitzwilliam Meetinghouse

Elias Carter (1781-1864) was an American architect whose first church design, at Brimfield, Massachusetts, was completed in 1805. He was born in 1781 to Timothy and Sarah (Walker) Carter in Ward, a village of Auburn, Massachusetts. His father, a builder, died when he was three, and the family moved to Hardwick when his mother remarried, to a farmer there. He followed in his father's profession, working in the American South for a time before returning to central Massachusetts. He was responsible for the construction of a number of churches in central Massachusetts, which an early biographer described as "typical white steepled churches of New England". His most influential design appears to have been the church in Templeton, Massachusetts, which inspired the design of at least two others. He also built houses throughout central Massachusetts, as well as a wing of the Westborough State Hospital, and played a role in the construction of the New Hampshire state insane asylum.

Many of his works are listed on the U.S. National Register of Historic Places.

Works (attribution) include:

- Gov. Levi Lincoln House (1834), 4 Avalon Pl., Worcester, MA, NRHP-listed
- Salisbury House (1836–38), 61 Harvard St., Worcester, MA, NRHP-listed. Designed by Carter or by Isaiah Rogers (sources disagree)
- Dowley-Taylor House (1842), 770 Main St., Worcester, MA, NRHP-listed
- Small House (1846), 156 Rogers Ave., Macon, GA, NRHP-listed
- Horatio Tower House (1848), 71 Pleasant St., Worcester, MA, NRHP-listed
- Acworth Congregational Church, north end of town common, Acworth, NH, NRHP-listed
- Church of Christ Congregational, 235 State Street, Granby, MA
- Domingos House, 1261 Jefferson Ter., Macon, GA, NRHP-listed
- Leroy Napier House, 2215 Napier Ave., Macon, GA, NRHP-listed
- Third Fitzwilliam Meetinghouse, Village Green, Fitzwilliam, NH, NRHP-listed
- Westborough State Hospital, along Lyman St. north of Chauncy Lake and jct. of South St. and MA 9, Westborough, MA (Carter, Elias), NRHP-listed
- One or more works in Barre Common District, bounded roughly by South, Exchange, Main, Pleasant, Broad, School and Grove Sts., Barre, MA, NRHP-listed
- One or more works in Brimfield Center Historic District, Main St., Brookfield, Wales, Sturbridge and Warren Rds., Brimfield, MA, NRHP-listed
- One or more works in Macon Historic District (Macon, Georgia), NRHP-listed
- One or more works in Mendon Center Historic District, roughly bounded by Main, Hastings, Maple, North, Washington & George Sts., Mendon, MA, NRHP-listed
- One or more works in Rabbit Hill Historic District, roughly bounded by Highland, Main, Franklin, and Milford Sts., Medway, MA, NRHP-listed
- One or more works in Templeton Common Historic District, Athol, Gardner, Hubbardston, Dudley, Wellington, and South Rds., Templeton, MA, NRHP-listed
