= Small House (Macon, Georgia) =

Historic house in Georgia, United States

- U.S. National Register of Historic Places
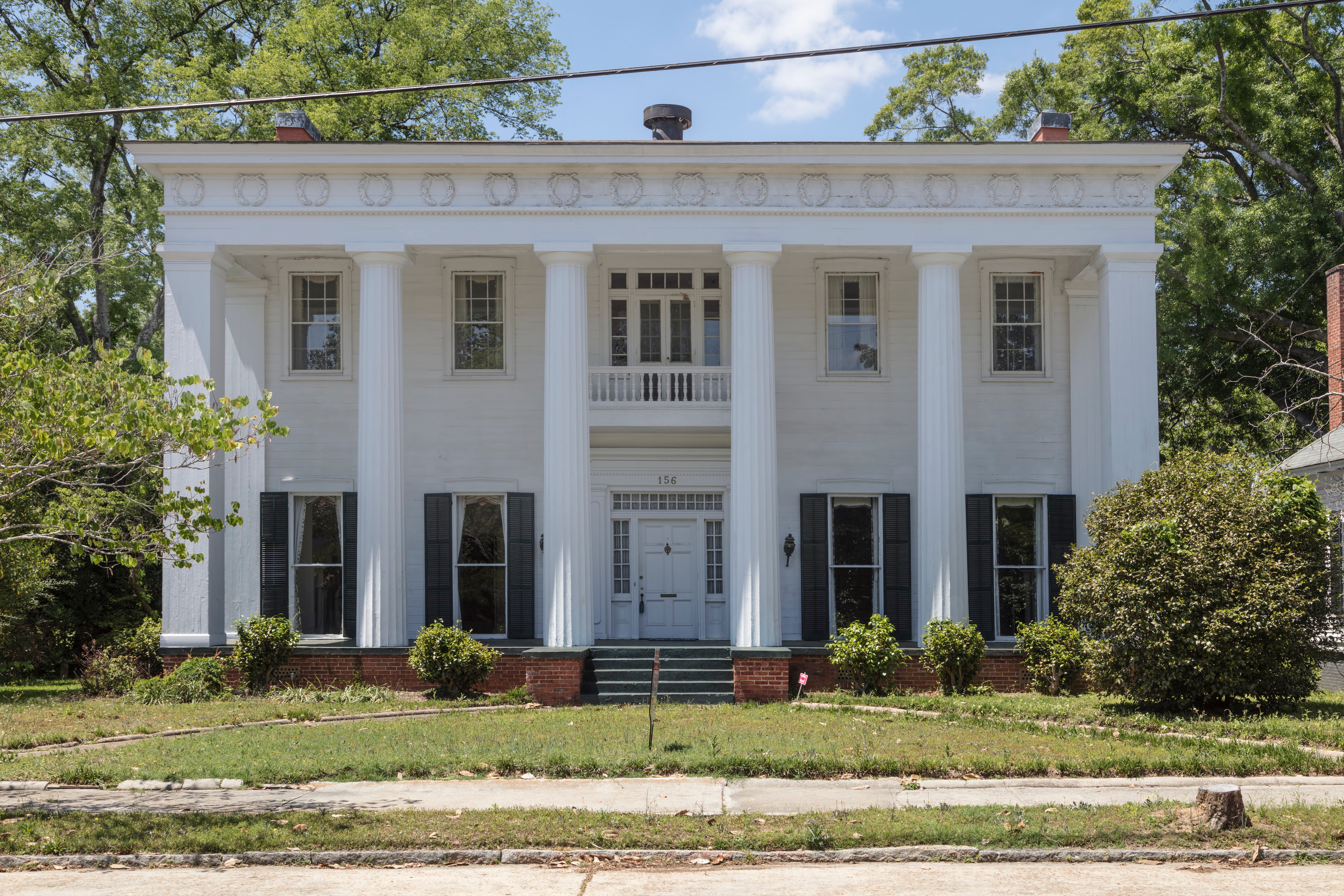

- Location within Georgia Location within the United States
- Location: 156 Rogers Ave., Macon, Georgia
- Coordinates: 32°50′50″N 83°39′21″W
- Built: 1846
- Architect: Elias Carter
- Architectural style: Greek Revival
- NRHP reference No.: 71000266
- Added to NRHP: May 27, 1971

The Small House in Macon, Georgia, also known as Ralph Small House, Napier-Small House, or McMullan-Napier-Small House, is a "distinguished" example of high-style Greek Revival architecture that was built in 1846 by Skelton Napier.

Among Greek Revival works, it has two extraordinary features. One is that the Doric columns of its portico are in antis, i.e. set in between square columns (antae), at the two front corners. There is no known precedent in original Greece or in the Greek Revival style, for columns used in antis for a "pro-style temple type portico". The four fluted Doric columns and the antae support the entablature of the portico.

The second is that it has a low wooden parapet with carved acroteria above the entablature, serving as a gallery or corona, that is exceptionally well executed. This ornamentation is "a satisfying response to the theme set by the laurel wreaths of the frieze and at the same time a kind of counter-point to the baldness of the antae which terminate the colonade."

It was built facing Vineville Avenue and was approached along a long driveway lined with cedar trees. However, when the area was broken up into smaller lots it was moved and turned and no longer has a spacious and stately setting.

It was listed on the National Register of Historic Places in 1971.

== Photos ==
The house was photographically documented repeatedly in U.S. Federal Government projects, by Frances Benjamin Johnston, Carol Highsmith, and others.

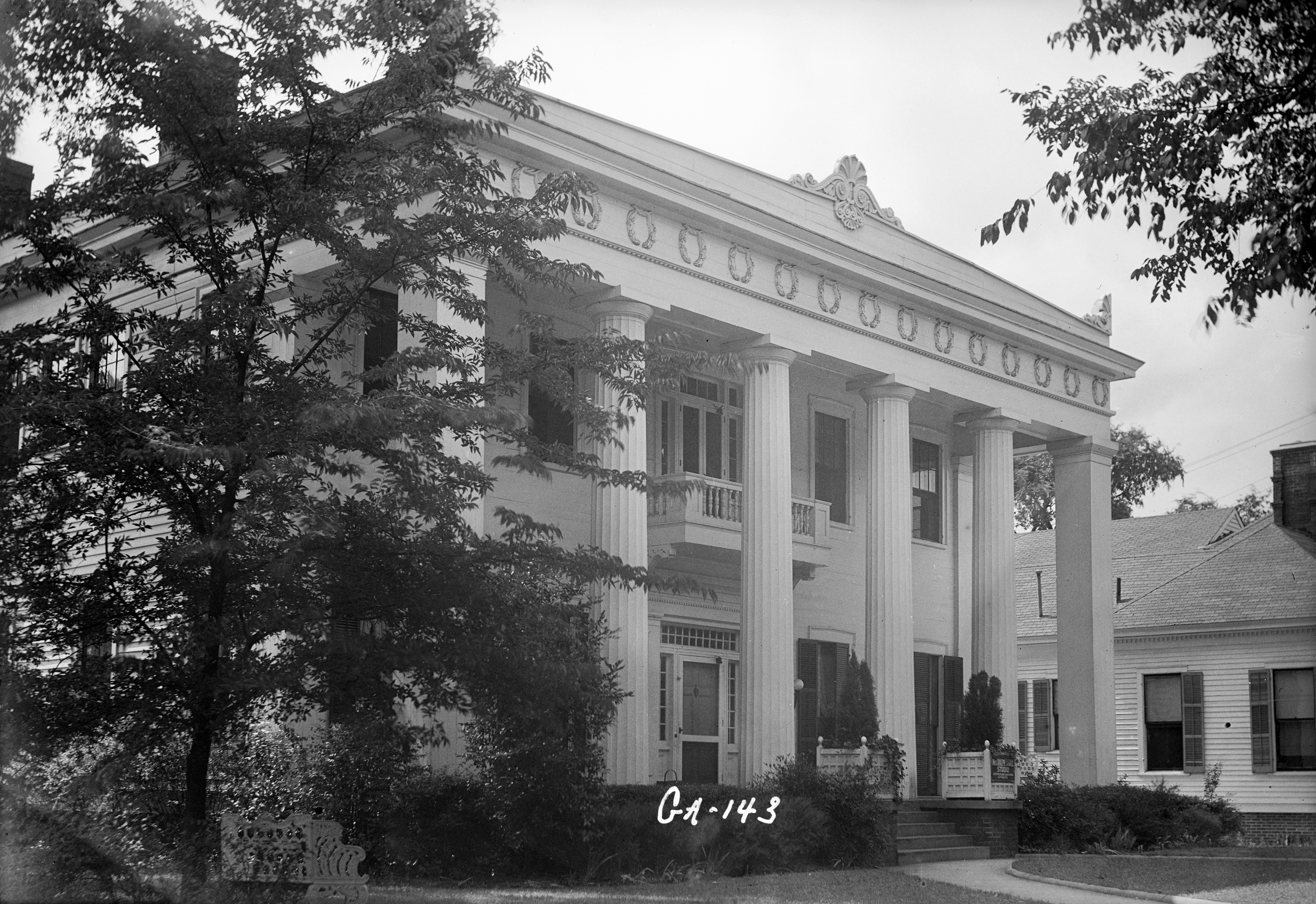
1936 photo by L.D. Andrew for the Historic American Buildings Survey
