= Brentwood Farm =

Historic house in Maryland

- U.S. National Register of Historic Places
- Location within Maryland Location within the United States
- Location: Allen Rd., Westover, Maryland
- Coordinates: 38°15′58″N 75°41′22″W
- Area: 13.7 acres (5.5 ha)
- Built: 1738
- Architectural style: Colonial Revival, Shingle Style
- NRHP reference No.: 86002174
- Added to NRHP: September 4, 1986

Brentwood Farm, also known as Adams Purchase and Smith's Adventure, is a historic home located at Westover, Somerset County, Maryland, United States. It is a two-story three-bay Flemish bond brick house built about 1738. The house was enlarged by a well-designed Shingle-style / Colonial Revival addition in 1916.

Brentwood Farm was listed on the National Register of Historic Places in 1986.
