= Rusticated concrete block =

Type of concrete block

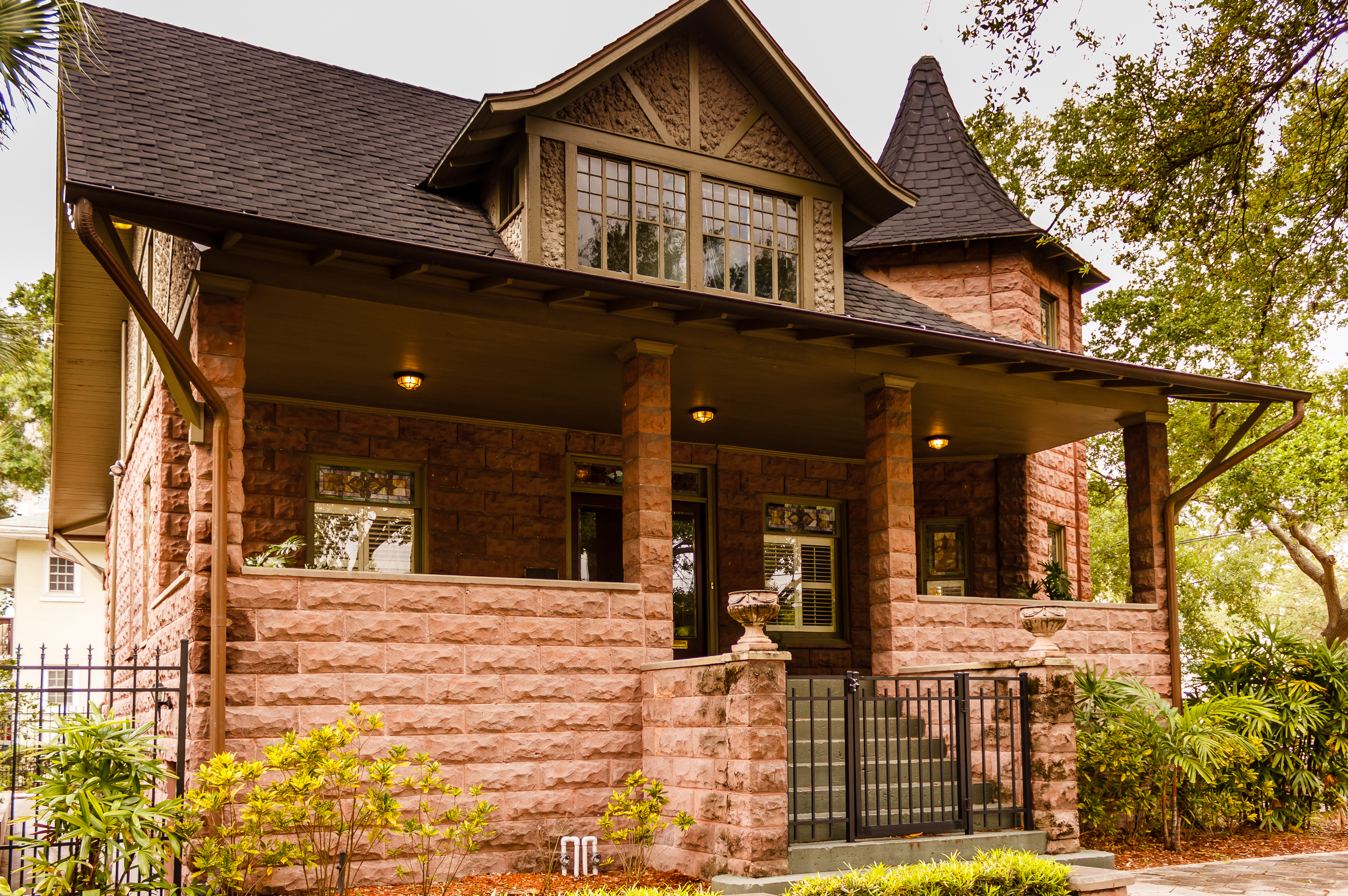
Rusticated concrete block is used here to mimic the appearance of rusticated natural stone. All blocks share the same pattern.

Rusticated concrete block is the handmade product of in-field advances in cement making. These concrete blocks first appeared in the late 19th century and are used mainly in residences and small building construction and are meant to resemble rusticated stone blocks. Rusticated concrete block involves a rough surface with a carved bevel detail around the edge of the face of the block. The rough texture of the face is created by running the concrete across a cast-iron face plate or by using a plaster mold taken from a cut stone block. This process of texturing concrete block was streamlined by an inventor named Harmon S. Palmer, who created a machine that combined the processes of texturing and forming the concrete blocks. Palmer's integration of the rusticated concrete block forming processes allowed for the material to gain national notoriety and led to its eventual inclusion in the Sears kit homes.

== History ==
Due to its low cost, concrete was a popular replacement for stone as a structural building element. As a building material, concrete was historically consigned to unseen structural positions such as behind a veneer or in the basement, but evolutions in texturing technology produced concrete blocks that could perform aesthetically as well as structurally. Rusticated concrete blocks, often referred to as rock-faced concrete blocks, from then on were seen as a cost-effective substitute for natural faced stone and from a reasonable distance could pass for the real thing. These rock-faced blocks were valued not only for their low cost but also for their natural fire resistance, sound absorption, and energy efficiency. Additionally, installment time was reduced as the irregularity of the faces eliminated the high level of precision needed in placing plain faced blocks.

=== Inclusion in Sears catalogs ===
The process of forming rusticated concrete blocks was simplified to the point that Sears was able to start selling concrete block machines in their catalogs to the general public. A catalog from 1939 offered two options for buyers interested in forming their own concrete blocks. The "Wizard" Concrete Block Machine was available for $32.95 and produced 8 × 8 × 16 inch blocks in a "Medium rock-face design". For $52.95, a prospective buyer could get the "Triumph" Concrete Block Machine which had the capacity of producing between 200 and 250 blocks per day.

== Difference between RCB and CMU ==
The differences between rusticated concrete blocks and concrete masonry units (CMU) are quite minimal. In fact, rusticated concrete blocks could be considered a type of concrete masonry unit. The main difference here is the treatment of the face of the concrete. As its name suggests, rusticated concrete block involves rustication, leaving the face that will be on the outside rough and often raised towards the middle. While architects may specify RCB as a cladding element, CMU is more often used in behind-the-scenes structural work.

== Present-day use ==
More recently, concrete fabricators have achieved the rusticated look through a process of splitting double-sized blocks with a sharp angled blade. As the aesthetic value of textured concrete block has become recognized, sales have steadily risen and many manufacturers have come to refer to it as architectural concrete block. Architects have begun specifying these concrete blocks not only for back-up walls but for cladding as well. The discontinuation of the practice of using plaster molds has eliminated repetitive patterns across concrete block faces, that hinted at their illegitimacy as natural stone, and allowed for irregularity that casts a variation of light and shadows. Once seen as a building material only suitable for low-budget projects, concrete block, through these advances in texturing and ornamentation, has become a highly desired conduit for architectural design.

== See also ==
- Masonry
