= Rabbit Hill Historic District =

Historic district in Massachusetts, United States

- U.S. National Register of Historic Places
- U.S. Historic district
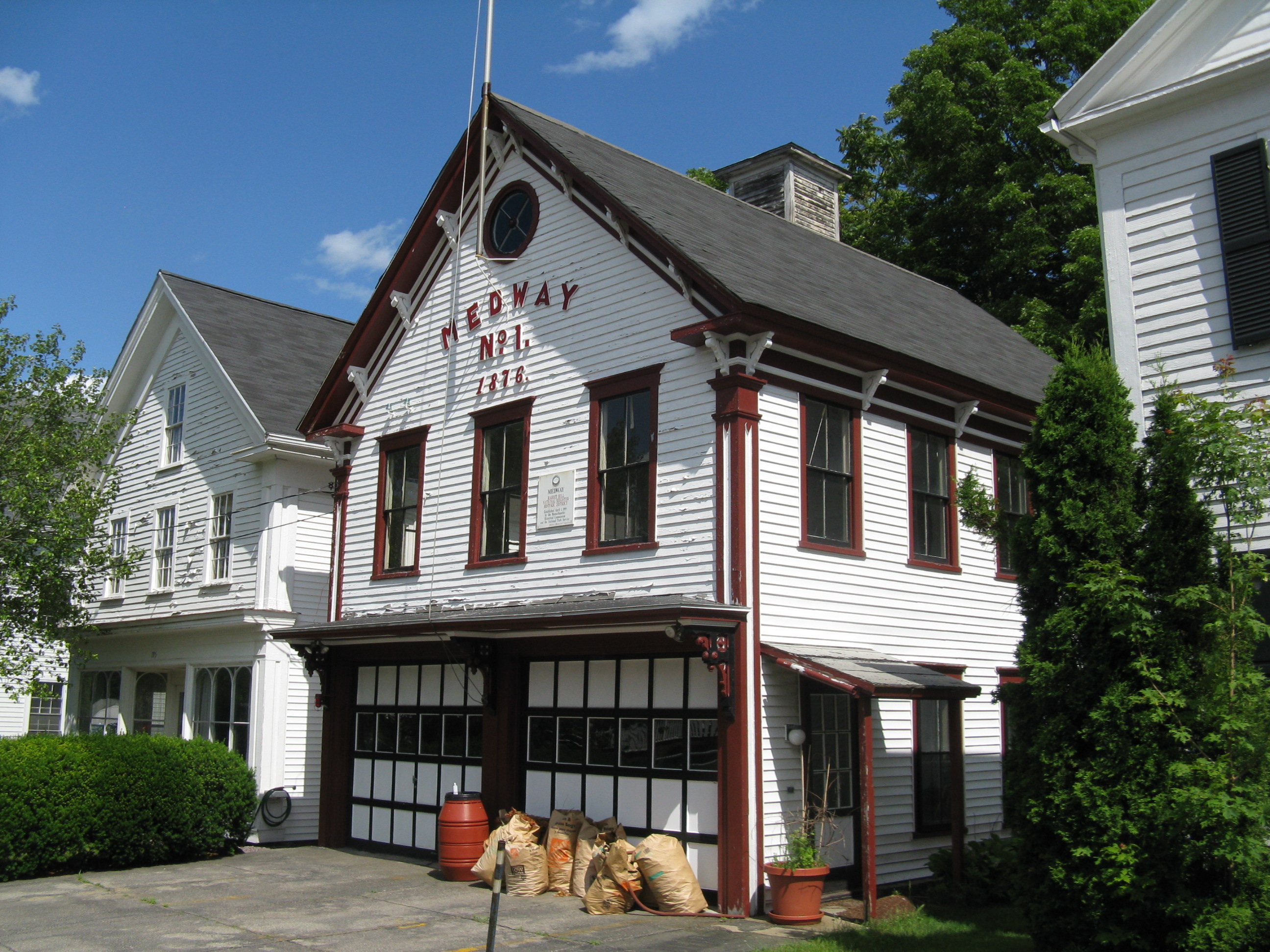
- Medway No. 1

- Location within Massachusetts Location within the United States
- Location: Medway, Massachusetts
- Coordinates: 42°8′39″N 71°26′2″W
- Architect: Carter, Elias; Bullard, Malachi
- Architectural style: Greek Revival, Late Victorian, Federal
- NRHP reference No.: 88000224
- Added to NRHP: April 1, 1988

The Rabbit Hill Historic District is a historic district roughly bounded by Highland, Main, Franklin, and Milford Streets in Medway, Massachusetts. It encompasses about 40 acres (16 ha) and much of a 19th-century village that developed around the Second Congregation Church (now the West Medway Community Church), and industrial facilities that developed along the Charles River just outside the district. Most of the residential properties in the district are Federal or Greek Revival in character.

The district was added to the National Register of Historic Places in 1988.

== See also ==
- National Register of Historic Places listings in Norfolk County, Massachusetts
