= Jesse Moore House =

Historic house in Massachusetts, United States

- U.S. National Register of Historic Places
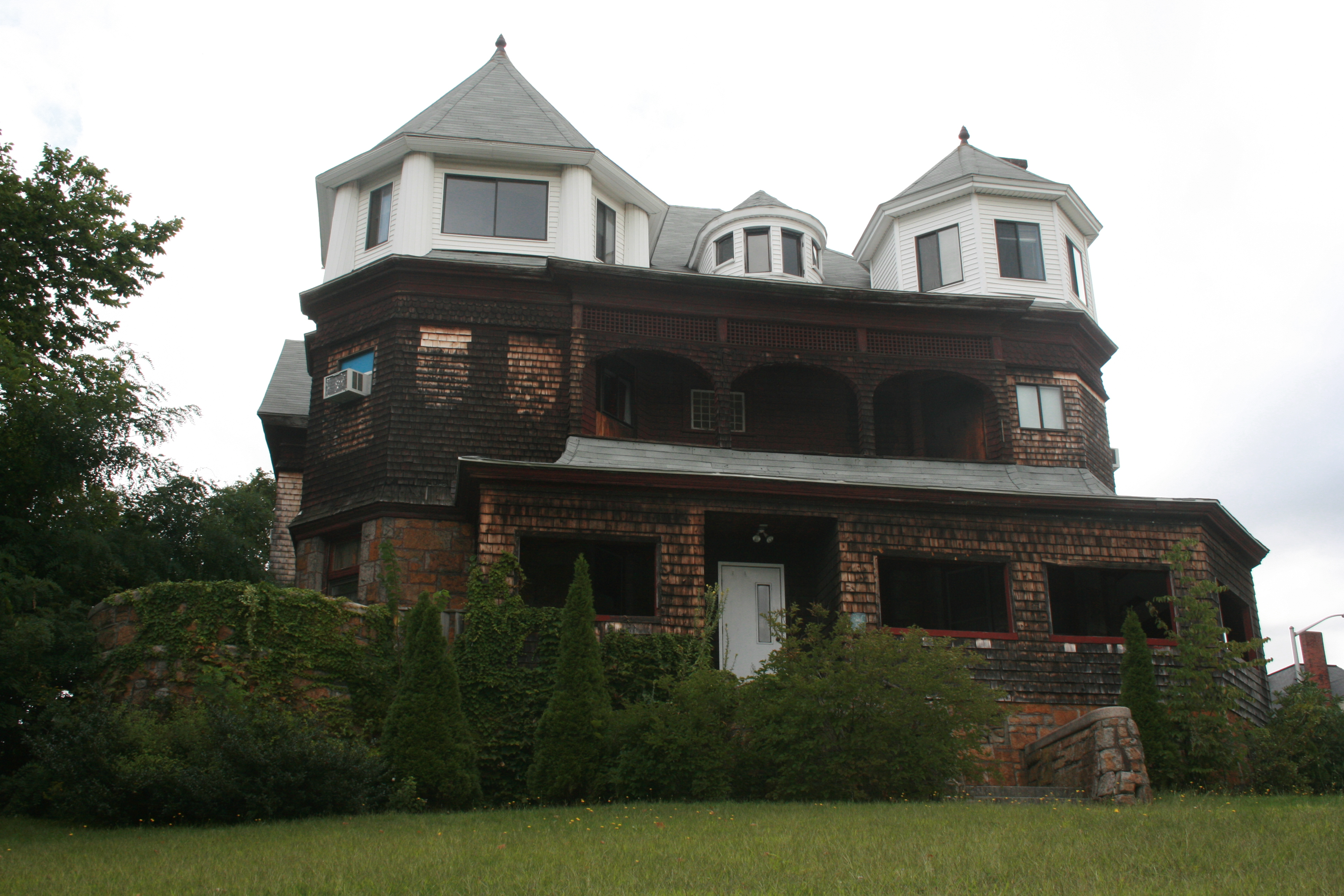

- Location within Massachusetts Location within the United States
- Location: 25 Catherine St., Worcester, Massachusetts
- Coordinates: 42°16′32″N 71°47′32″W
- Area: less than one acre
- Built: 1890
- Architectural style: Queen Anne
- MPS: Worcester MRA
- NRHP reference No.: 80000557
- Added to NRHP: March 05, 1980

The Jesse Moore House is a historic house at 25 Catherine Street in Worcester, Massachusetts. Completed in 1891, it is one of the city's well-preserved examples of high-style Queen Anne architecture with Shingle style features. The house was listed on the National Register of Historic Places in 1980.

== Description and history ==
The Jesse Moore House is located northeast of downtown Worcester, in the Bell Hill neighborhood. It occupies a lot at the northwest corner of Catherine and Windsor Streets, where it is set up on a rise, with a granite retaining wall at the sidewalk. It is a 2 1/2-story structure, with the asymmetrical style and massing typical of the Queen Anne style. It has two three-story octagonal towers on its southern facade, along with a shingled porch. The second level has a recessed porch area between the two towers. Its ground floor is finished in rock-faced granite, while the upper levels are finished in wooden clapboards and shingles. Portions of the front and sides are decorated with colored terra cotta tiles.

The house was built in 1890–91; its architect is unknown, but may be Baker & Nourse based on a stylistic comparison to another local house they designed. The adjacent Draper Ruggles House was moved a short distance to make way for its construction. Nothing is known of the first owner, Jesse Moore, in whose family it remained until 1925. At that time it was purchased by the Louis Pasteur Hospital.

== See also ==
- National Register of Historic Places listings in eastern Worcester, Massachusetts
