= Salisbury Mansion and Store =

Historic house in Massachusetts, United States

- U.S. National Register of Historic Places
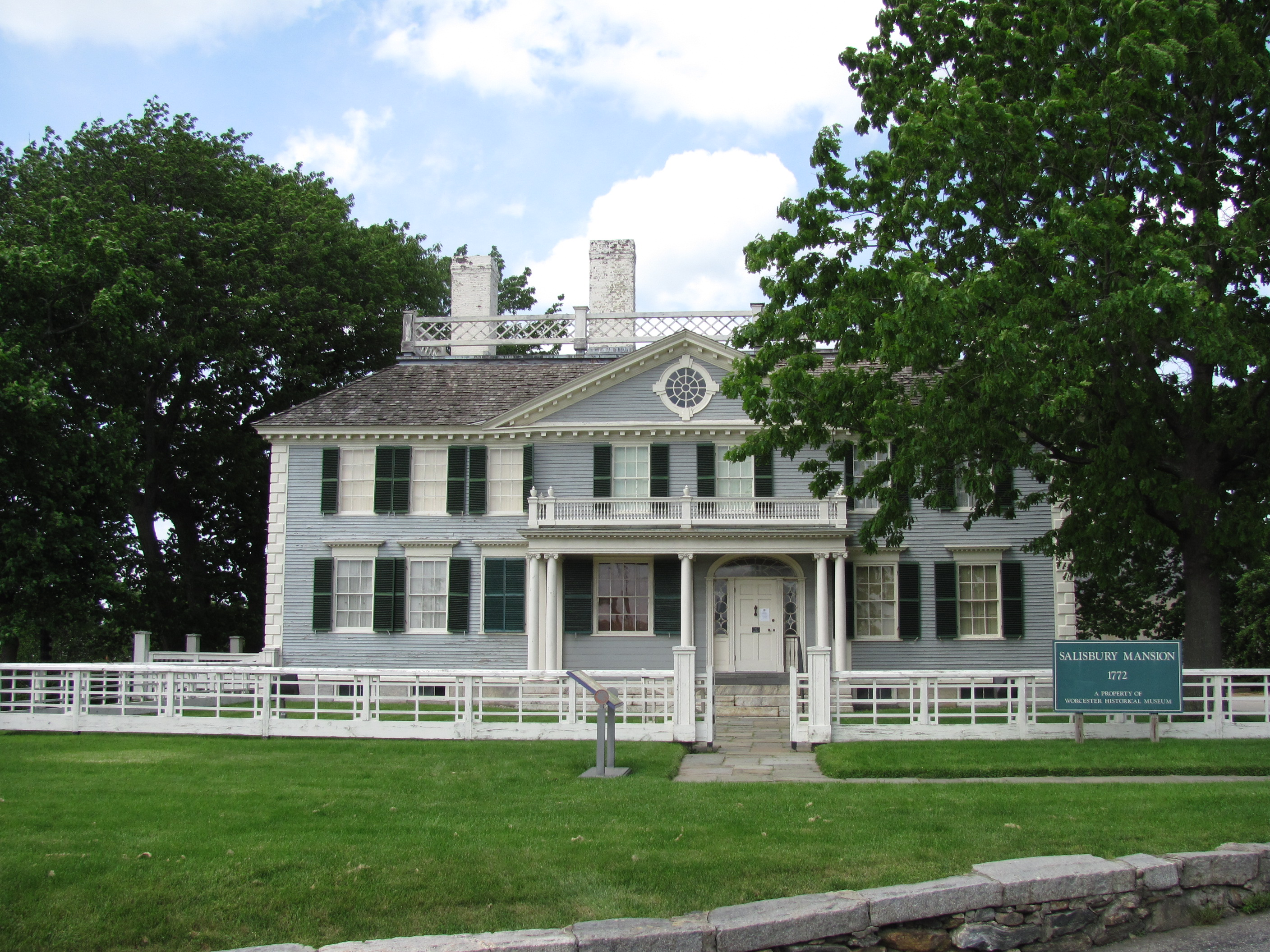
- Salisbury Mansion

- Location within Massachusetts Location within the United States
- Location: 30, 40 Highland St., Worcester, Massachusetts
- Coordinates: 42°16′19″N 71°48′10″W
- Built: 1772
- Architect: Savage, Abraham; Et al.
- MPS: Worcester MRA
- NRHP reference No.: 75000838
- Added to NRHP: May 30, 1975

The Salisbury Mansion and Store is an historic house museum at 40 Highland Street in Worcester, Massachusetts.

== History ==
The house was originally built on Lincoln Square in 1772 by Stephen Salisbury I with an attached storehouse from which he sold imported goods under the name S. & S. Salisbury. He and his brother Samuel had originally been in business together selling hardware goods in Boston, and Stephen moved to Worcester to expand the operation. Originally, Salisbury Mansion was one-third house and two-thirds store. In 1820 the store was closed down, and the space was converted for residential use by the family, which occupied it until 1851. Thereafter it served as a girls' school, tenant house, and then a gentleman's social club until 1929, when the building was threatened with demolition by the then occupants, the Worcester Lincoln Square Boys Club, who wanted to build more modern premises. It was saved by local efforts and moved to its current location on the former Salisbury estate near the museum and next to Salisbury House. It was donated to the American Antiquarian Society, which promptly gave it to the Worcester Art Museum, both of which were founded by Stephen Salisbury III.

Salisbury Mansion was sold to the organization now known as the Worcester Center for Crafts before it was acquired by the Salisbury Mansion Associates (SMA) in the 1950s. The building was listed on the National Register of Historic Places in 1975. From 1980 to 1984 the Museum of Worcester restored the much-altered building to its condition as of 1830, and assumed ownership when the SMA merged with the museum in 1985. It now operates as a historic house museum and is open for guided tours.

== See also ==
- National Register of Historic Places listings in northwestern Worcester, Massachusetts
- National Register of Historic Places listings in Worcester County, Massachusetts
