= Salisbury House (Worcester, Massachusetts) =

Historic house in Massachusetts, United States

- U.S. National Register of Historic Places
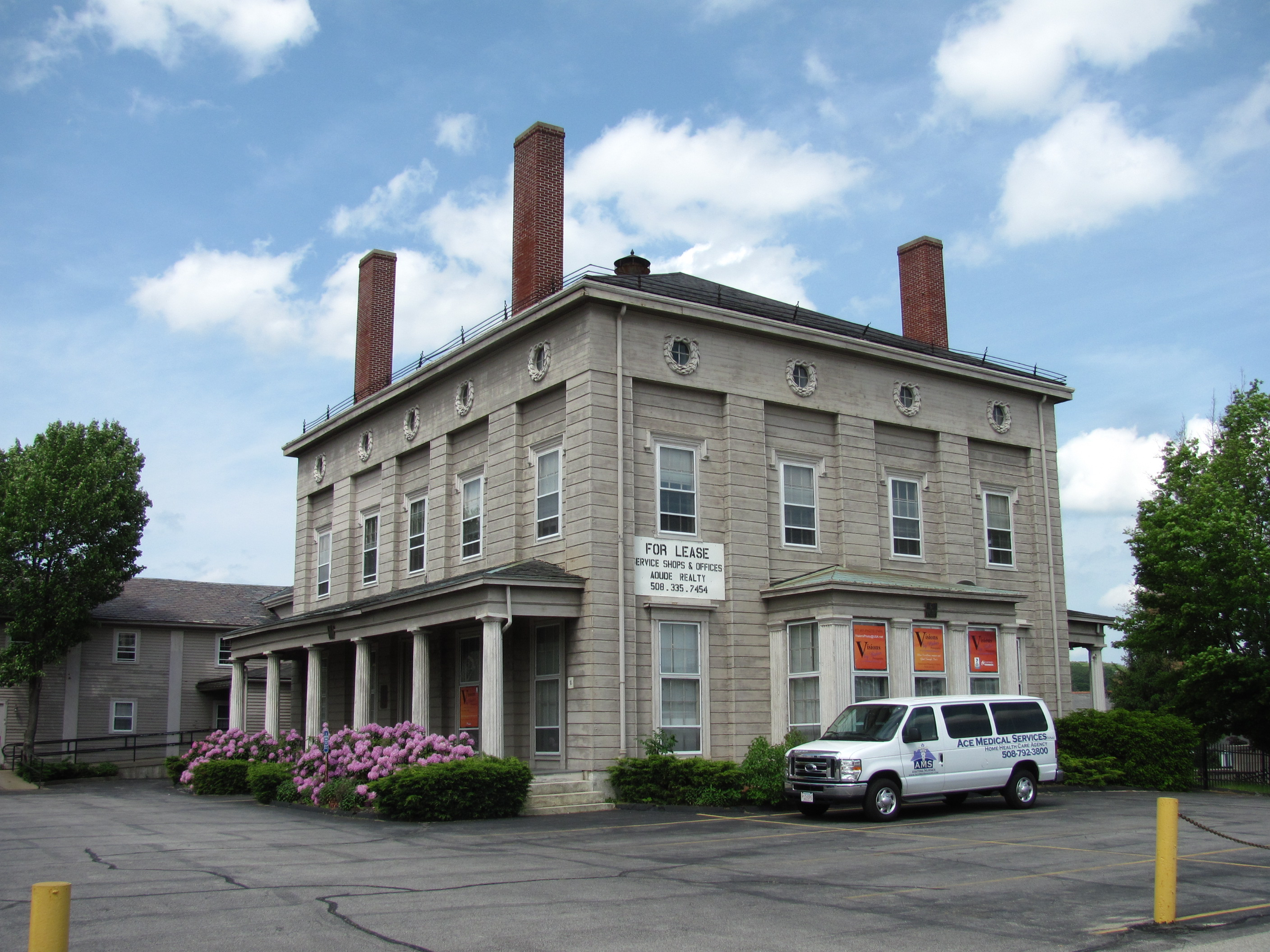
- Salisbury House

- Location within Massachusetts Location within the United States
- Interactive map showing Salisbury House’s location
- Location: 61 Harvard St., Worcester, Massachusetts
- Coordinates: 42°16′19″N 71°48′8″W
- Built: 1836-38
- Architect: Elias Carter
- Architectural style: Greek Revival
- MPS: Worcester MRA
- NRHP reference No.: 75000837
- Added to NRHP: June 10, 1975

The Salisbury House is an historic house at 61 Harvard Street in Worcester, Massachusetts.

The Greek Revival building was constructed between 1836 and 1838 by Stephen Salisbury II, son of Worcester merchant Stephen Salisbury I whose 18th century mansion stands nearby. It was added to the National Register of Historic Places in 1975. The two-story wood-frame structure is finished in flushboarded wood treated to resemble stone. Design of the building is attributed either to Elias Carter or Isaiah Rogers (sources disagree).

== See also ==
- National Register of Historic Places listings in northwestern Worcester, Massachusetts
