= Dowley-Taylor House =

Historic house in Massachusetts, United States

- U.S. National Register of Historic Places
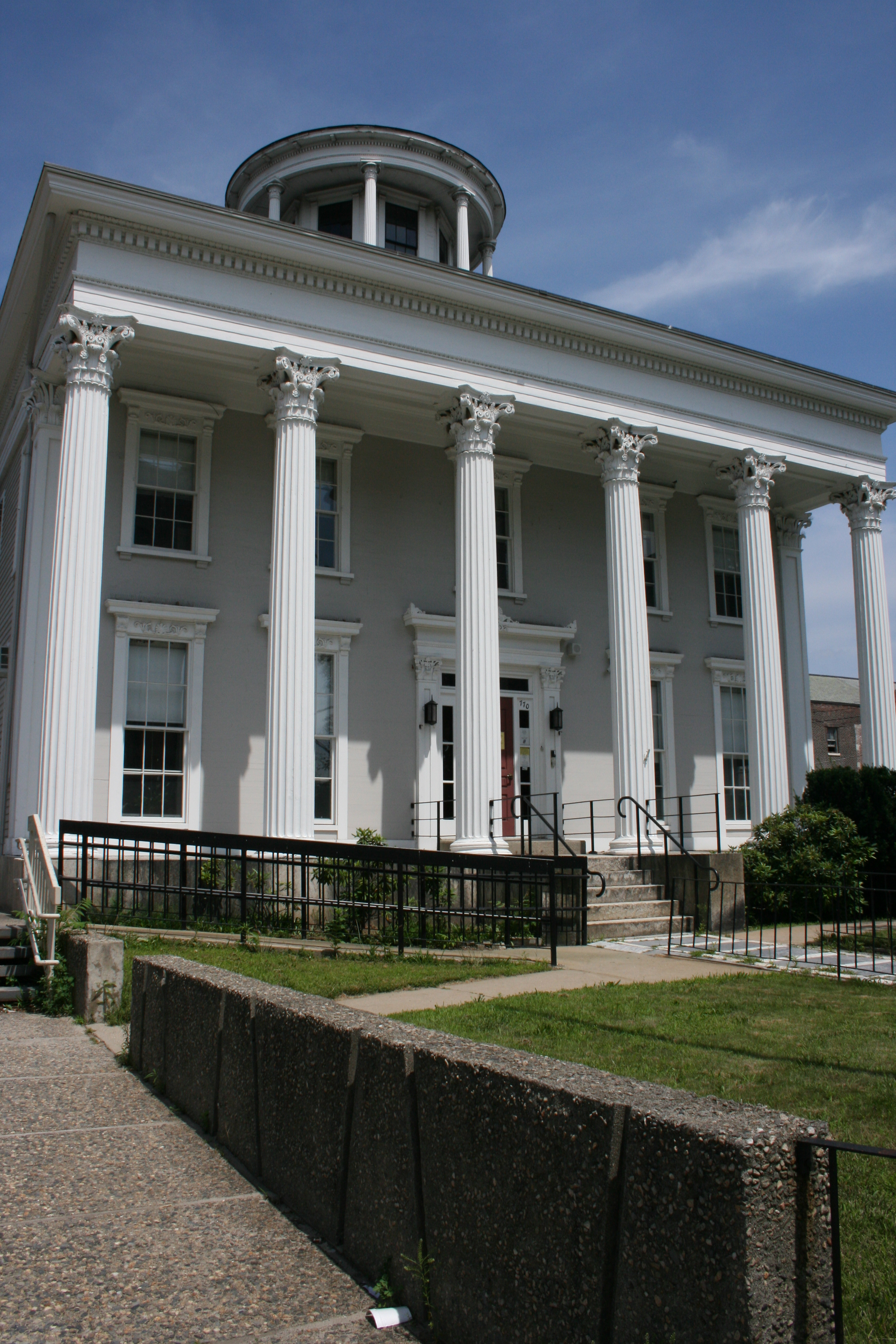

- Location within Massachusetts Location within the United States
- Location: 770 Main St., Worcester, Massachusetts
- Coordinates: 42°15′24″N 71°48′40″W
- Built: 1842
- Architect: Elias Carter
- Architectural style: Greek Revival
- MPS: Worcester MRA
- NRHP reference No.: 80000627
- Added to NRHP: March 05, 1980

The Dowley-Taylor House is a historic house at 770 Main Street in Worcester, Massachusetts. Built in 1842 to a design by architect Elias Carter, it is one of the best-preserved high-style Greek Revival mansions in the city. The house was listed on the National Register of Historic Places in 1980.

== Description and history ==
The Dowley-Taylor House is set on the north side of Main Street, south of Worcester's downtown business district. It is a large two story rectangular block with a hip roof topped by an oversized cupola with a surrounding porch. Its front facade consists of a full height portico supported by Corinthian columns. The front door is centered on the five-bay facade, surrounded by sidelight and transom windows and topped by an elaborate entablature supported by pilasters. The building corners are pilastered, and the windows of the front are framed by moulded caps. The house originally had a parapete crowned by an eagle, but that was removed at some point.

The house was built in 1842 to a design by Worcester architect Elias Carter, and is the best-preserved of a small number of surviving Greek Revival mansions in the city. It was first occupied by Levi Dowley, a leathermaker and banker. After financial reverses, he sold it to armsmaker Ethan Allen, who moved it to its present location in 1853. It was owned for a time by Frank H. Kelley, who served as mayor of Worcester. In 1882 the house was purchased by Ransom Taylor, a prominent local real estate developer. It remained in Taylor family hands until 1957, when it was sold to Worcester Junior College, which adapted it for classroom use.

== See also ==
- National Register of Historic Places listings in southwestern Worcester, Massachusetts
- National Register of Historic Places listings in Worcester County, Massachusetts
