= Salisbury Plantation (Woodville, Mississippi) =

Historic house in Mississippi, United States

- U.S. National Register of Historic Places
- Location within Mississippi Location within the United States
- Location: Off Woodville Rd., Woodville, Mississippi, U.S.
- Coordinates: 31°3′28″N 91°26′39″W
- Area: 1 acre (0.40 ha)
- Built: c. 1811
- NRHP reference No.: 83000970
- Added to NRHP: June 16, 1983

The Salisbury Plantation is a Southern plantation with a historic house located near Woodville, Mississippi, USA. The one-story house was built circa 1811. It has been listed on the National Register of Historic Places since June 16, 1983.
