= Jonas Salisbury House (62 Walnut Park) =

Historic house in Massachusetts, United States

- U.S. National Register of Historic Places
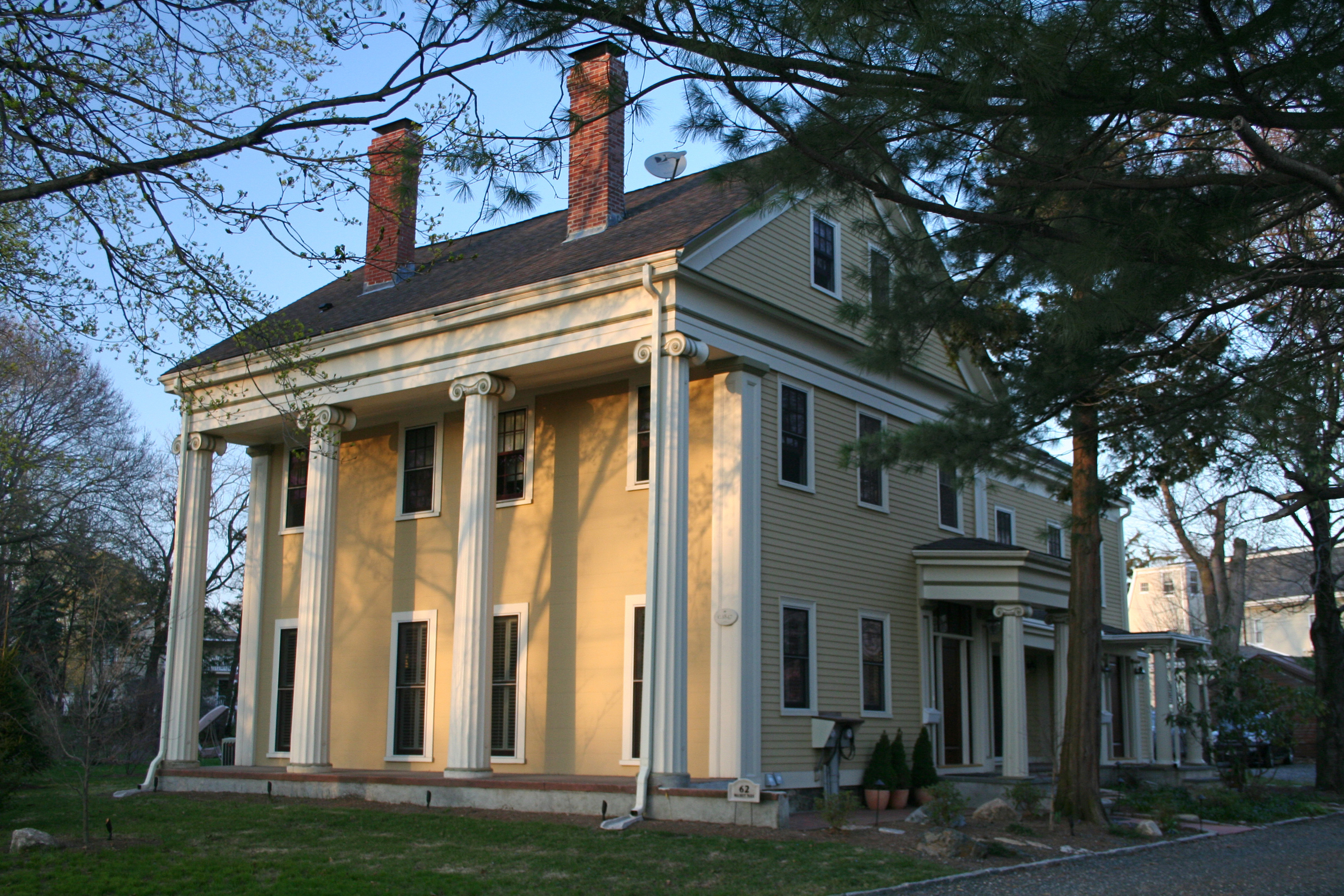

- Location within Massachusetts Location within the United States
- Location: 62 Walnut Park, Newton, Massachusetts
- Coordinates: 42°21′24″N 71°11′33″W
- Built: 1847
- Architect: Fuller, Henry
- Architectural style: Greek Revival
- MPS: Newton MRA
- NRHP reference No.: 86001875
- Added to NRHP: September 04, 1986

The Jonas Salisbury House is a historic house at 62 Walnut Park in Newton, Massachusetts. The 2 1/2-story wood-frame house was built about 1847, and was one of four temple-front mansions built in the Newton Corner area. Of these, it is the only one still standing. It has typical hallmarks of the Greek Revival style, with flushboarded facade, corner pilasters, and an entrance flanked by pilasters and set under a pediment. The property also includes a period carriage house. Jonas Salisbury was a significant property owner in Newton.

The house was listed on the National Register of Historic Places in 1986.

== See also ==
- Jonas Salisbury House (85 Langley Road), a house owned by Salisbury
- National Register of Historic Places listings in Newton, Massachusetts
