= Jonas Salisbury House (85 Langley Road) =

Historic house in Massachusetts, United States

- U.S. National Register of Historic Places
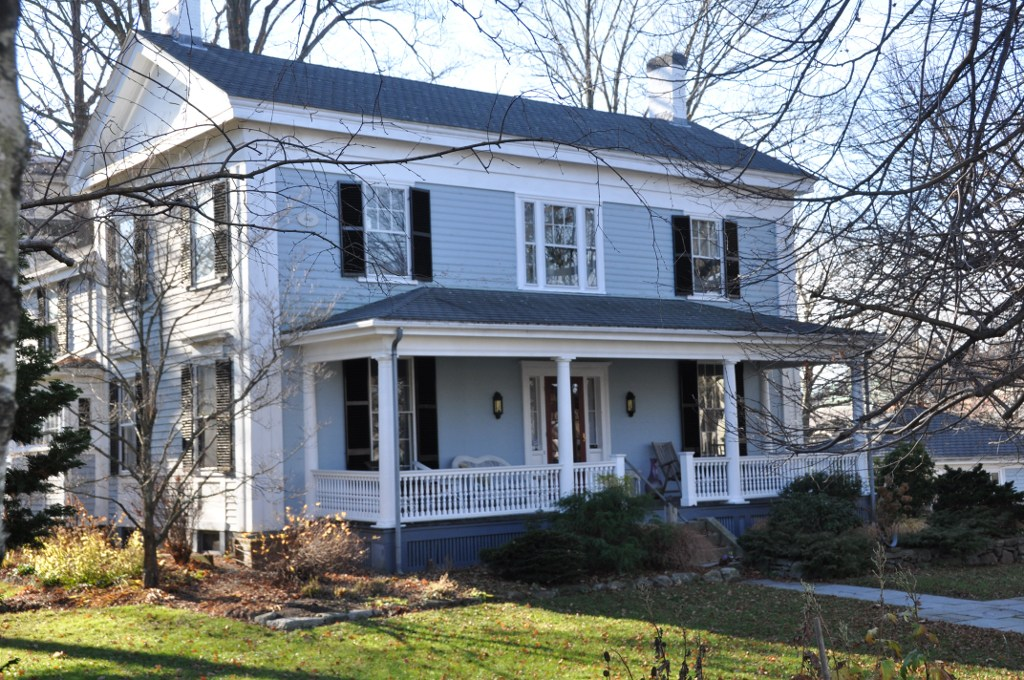

- Location within Massachusetts Location within the United States
- Location: Newton, Massachusetts
- Coordinates: 42°19′46.2″N 71°11′27.5″W
- Built: 1847
- Architect: Fuller, Henry
- Architectural style: Greek Revival
- MPS: Newton MRA
- NRHP reference No.: 86001876
- Added to NRHP: September 4, 1986

The Jonas Salisbury House is a historic house at 85 Langley Road in Newton, Massachusetts. The 2 1/2-story Greek Revival house was built in 1847, and is particularly significant because its original construction contract has survived. The house was built by Henry Fuller for Jonas Salisbury, a local landowner, at a cost of $2,630. Salisbury sold the house in 1853 for $4,000; it is unclear whether he ever lived in the house.

The house was listed on the National Register of Historic Places in 1986.

== See also ==
- Jonas Salisbury House (62 Walnut Park), a probably Salisbury residence
- National Register of Historic Places listings in Newton, Massachusetts
