= Salisbury (Chesterfield County, Virginia) =

Plantation in Virginia

Coordinates: 37°31′52.53″N 77°38′35.97″W

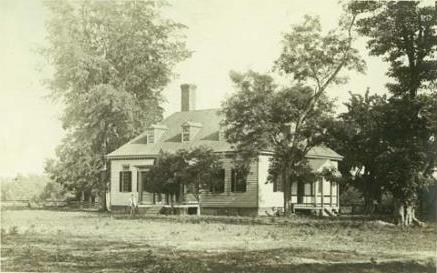
Salisbury in 1888

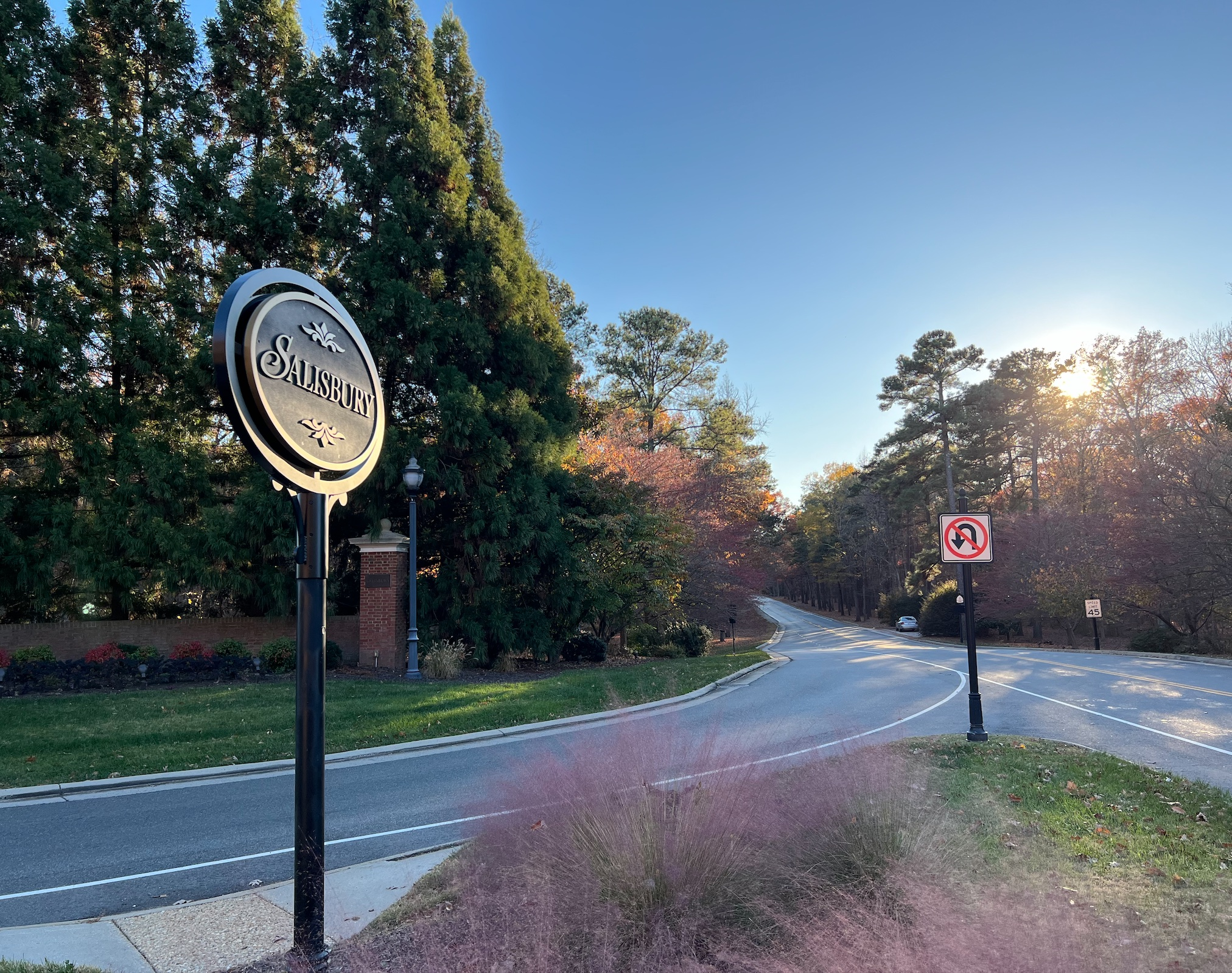
An entrance to the Salisbury suburb, which was established around the site of the Salisbury plantation.

Salisbury was a house and plantation in northwestern Chesterfield County, Virginia in the Southside area of Metro Richmond, Virginia. It was most likely built in the early 1760s by Abraham Salle (c.1732-c.1800), a descendant of Huguenot refugees fleeing persecution in France. Salle's grandfather, also named Abraham (1670–1719), was the immigrant ancestor for most of the Huguenot Salles living in Colonial Virginia. Abraham Salle (the younger) had "assembled the original 1,500 acre tract between 1760 to 1763" from various parcels of land primarily owned by his uncles William and Robert Wooldridge. The Wooldridges had inherited the land from their father, John "Blacksmith" Wooldridge (c.1678-1757), himself the immigrant ancestor of all Wooldridges living in the American South.

Abraham sold it to Thomas Mann Randolph in 1777. Randolph used the plantation house as a hunting lodge. His main plantation, Tuckahoe, was just north of Salisbury, across the James River. The famed American patriot and statesman, Patrick Henry, rented the house during two of his terms as governor of Virginia from 1784 to 1786 because the governor's residence in Richmond used at the time of his tenure was not large enough to accommodate Henry's family.

Eventually, Salisbury was sold to Dr. Philip Turpin, a graduate of the University of Edinburgh. Upon Turpin's death at Salisbury, the plantation passed to his daughter and son-in-law, Caroline and Dr. Edward Johnson. Their son was Confederate Major General Edward Johnson, who participated in the Civil War. After the conflict, Edward Johnson returned to Salisbury (which he had inherited in 1843) to farm along with his brother, Philip Turpin Johnson. The two brothers died at Salisbury in 1873 and 1882, respectively. In 1882, Salisbury, along with the rest of the estate of Philip T. Johnson, passed to Dr. Joseph W. Johnson, a druggist in Richmond.

Dr. Johnson likely leased the land to the Salisbury coal company, but in November 1905, he offered it for sale. In December 1905, the Salisbury estate was sold to H. D. Eichelberger (who represented the Ginter estate, owner of all of the former Clover Hill mining lands) for $25,000 (~$674,624 in 2024). Later, in 1906, Salisbury and its 1,585-acre property were sold to George Arents and Thomas F. Jefress. The two men were tobacco executives and entrepreneurs. Furthermore, Arents was the nephew of the affluent Richmond businessman, Lewis Ginter; while Jeffress built the Meadowbrook mansion in 1918 in southern Chesterfield, which was said to have been the largest house ever built in Chesterfield County. (Unfortunately, it burned down in 1967 and is now the site of Meadowbrook Country Club.) In 1923, the over 150-year-old house burned down. It was sold by Richmond attorney James Marshall Turner to the Salisbury Corporation in June 1956 for $110,000 (~$969,298 in 2024) and was noted as "the largest individually owned tract located close to any major city in the East." This company built the subdivision of Salisbury starting in 1958. In the current day, the clubhouse of the Salisbury Country Club (established 1963) is located near where the Salisbury Plantation main house once stood and its central section was built to resemble the original Salisbury.
