= Salisbury Plantation (Westover, Maryland) =

Historic house in Maryland, United States

- U.S. National Register of Historic Places
- Location within Maryland Location within the United States
- Location: Clyde Ford Road, Westover, Maryland
- Coordinates: 38°5′18″N 75°44′13″W
- Area: 63.8 acres (25.8 ha)
- Built: 1725
- NRHP reference No.: 75000919
- Added to NRHP: June 20, 1975

Salisbury Plantation is a historic house located at Westover, Somerset County, Maryland. It has two principal sections: a 19th-century, two-story plus attic clapboard section whose roof ridge runs east to west, and a first-quarter-18th-century 1 1/2-story brick section with its ridge running north to south.

It was listed on the National Register of Historic Places in 1975.
