= U.S. Route 113 =

Highway in the United States

U.S. Route 113
- US 113 highlighted in red

Route information
- Auxiliary route of US 13
- Maintained by MDSHA and DelDOT
- Length: 74.75 mi (120.30 km)
- Existed: 1926–present
- Tourist routes: Cape to Cape Scenic Byway

Major junctions
- South end: US 13 in Pocomoke City, Maryland
- MD 12 in Snow Hill, Maryland; US 50 in Berlin, Maryland; MD 90 near Ocean Pines, Maryland; DE 54 in Selbyville, Delaware; DE 26 in Dagsboro, Delaware; DE 24 in Millsboro, Delaware; US 9 in Georgetown, Delaware; DE 18 / DE 404 in Georgetown, Delaware; DE 16 in Ellendale, Delaware; DE 14 in Milford, Delaware
- North end: DE 1 in Milford, Delaware

Location
- Country: United States
- States: Maryland, Delaware
- Counties: Maryland: Worcester; Delaware: Sussex, Kent

Highway system
- United States Numbered Highway System; List; Special; Divided
- Delaware State Route System; List; Byways
- Maryland highway system; Interstate; US; State; Scenic Byways
← DE 100	Delaware	→ US 122
← MD 112	Maryland	→ MD 115

U.S. Route 113 (US 113) is a U.S. Highway that is a spur of US 13 in the U.S. states of Maryland and Delaware. The route runs 74.75 miles (120.30 km) from US 13 in Pocomoke City, Maryland, north to Delaware Route 1 (DE 1) in Milford, Delaware. In conjunction with DE 1, US 113 is one of two major north–south highways on the Delmarva Peninsula (with US 13) that connect Dover with Pocomoke City and the Eastern Shore of Virginia. The U.S. Highway is the primary north–south highway in Worcester County, Maryland, where it connects Pocomoke City with Snow Hill and Berlin. US 113 is one of three major north–south highways in Sussex County, Delaware, where it connects Selbyville, Millsboro, and Georgetown with Milford. While US 113 does not pass through Ocean City or the Delaware Beaches, the U.S. Highway intersects several highways that serve the Atlantic seaboard resorts, including US 50, Maryland Route 90 (MD 90), US 9, DE 404, DE 16, and DE 1. US 113 is a four-lane divided highway for its entire length.

US 113 follows the corridor of a post road established in the late 18th century to connect the aforementioned towns on the Delmarva Peninsula with Wilmington and Philadelphia. The highway was improved as an all-weather road in the 1910s. In Maryland, the post road was designated one of the original state roads established by the Maryland State Roads Commission (MDSRC) in 1909. In Delaware, the highway was the Selbyville–Dover portion of the DuPont Highway, a roadway whose construction was a grand philanthropic measure of Thomas Coleman DuPont. The DuPont Highway, which was started by DuPont's company and finished by the Delaware State Highway Department (DSHD), spurred economic growth in the tourism and agriculture sectors in southern Delaware. The economic growth resulted in heavy traffic; US 113 was widened in both states in the early 1930s and again in the late 1940s. Bypasses of Dover and Pocomoke City were built in the mid-1930s; the bypassed section of highway in Dover became US 113 Alternate.

Expansion of US 113 to a divided highway began in the 1950s in Dover. Much of the remainder of the U.S. Highway in Delaware was expanded in the 1960s; the final section of two-lane US 113 in that state was expanded in the mid-1990s. The Berlin bypass became the first section of US 113 in Maryland to be expanded to a divided highway in the mid-1950s. In the early 1970s, US 113 between Pocomoke City and Snow Hill was expanded to a divided highway and the Snow Hill bypass was constructed, replacing what would become US 113 Business. The U.S. Highway between Berlin and the Delaware state line was expanded to a divided highway around 2000. The Maryland State Highway Administration (MDSHA) upgraded the last remaining two-lane portions of US 113 between Snow Hill and Berlin to a four-lane divided highway, with completion in 2019. US 113's northern terminus was moved to Milford in 2004 after the U.S. Highway was superseded by DE 1 from Milford to Dover. The Delaware Department of Transportation (DelDOT) plans to upgrade US 113 to a freeway in some areas. Originally, there had been plans to upgrade it all from Selbyville to Ellendale, but freeway bypasses of Milford and Millsboro were cancelled or altered due to community opposition.

== Route description ==
US 113 serves as an important route carrying local and through traffic along with tourist traffic bound for the Delaware Beaches and Ocean City, Maryland, to the east; as such the highway experiences congestion in the summer months when tourism to the beach areas is at its highest. Access from US 113 to the beach areas is provided by US 9, DE 404, and DE 16 toward Lewes, Rehoboth Beach, and Dewey Beach; DE 26 toward Bethany Beach; DE 54 toward Fenwick Island; MD 90 toward northern Ocean City; US 50 toward downtown Ocean City; and MD 376 toward Assateague Island. US 113 also serves as a part of a primary hurricane evacuation route from the beach communities to inland areas to the north. In 2016, US 113 had an annual average daily traffic count ranging from a high of 38,505 vehicles at the US 9 intersection in Georgetown to a low of 6,070 vehicles between the southern terminus of US 113 Business and MD 12 in Snow Hill. All of US 113 is part of the National Highway System, a network of roads important to the country's economy, defense, and mobility.

=== Maryland ===
US 113 has a length of 37.49 miles (60.33 km) in Maryland, where the route is named Worcester Highway. The highway extends the north–south length of Worcester County and serves three of the county's four towns: Pocomoke City, Snow Hill, and Berlin. US 50 connects US 113 with the county's fourth town, Ocean City. Between Snow Hill and Berlin, the U.S. Highway is part of the Cape to Cape Scenic Byway, a Maryland Scenic Byway that comprises several highways in Worcester County.

==== Pocomoke City to Snow Hill ====
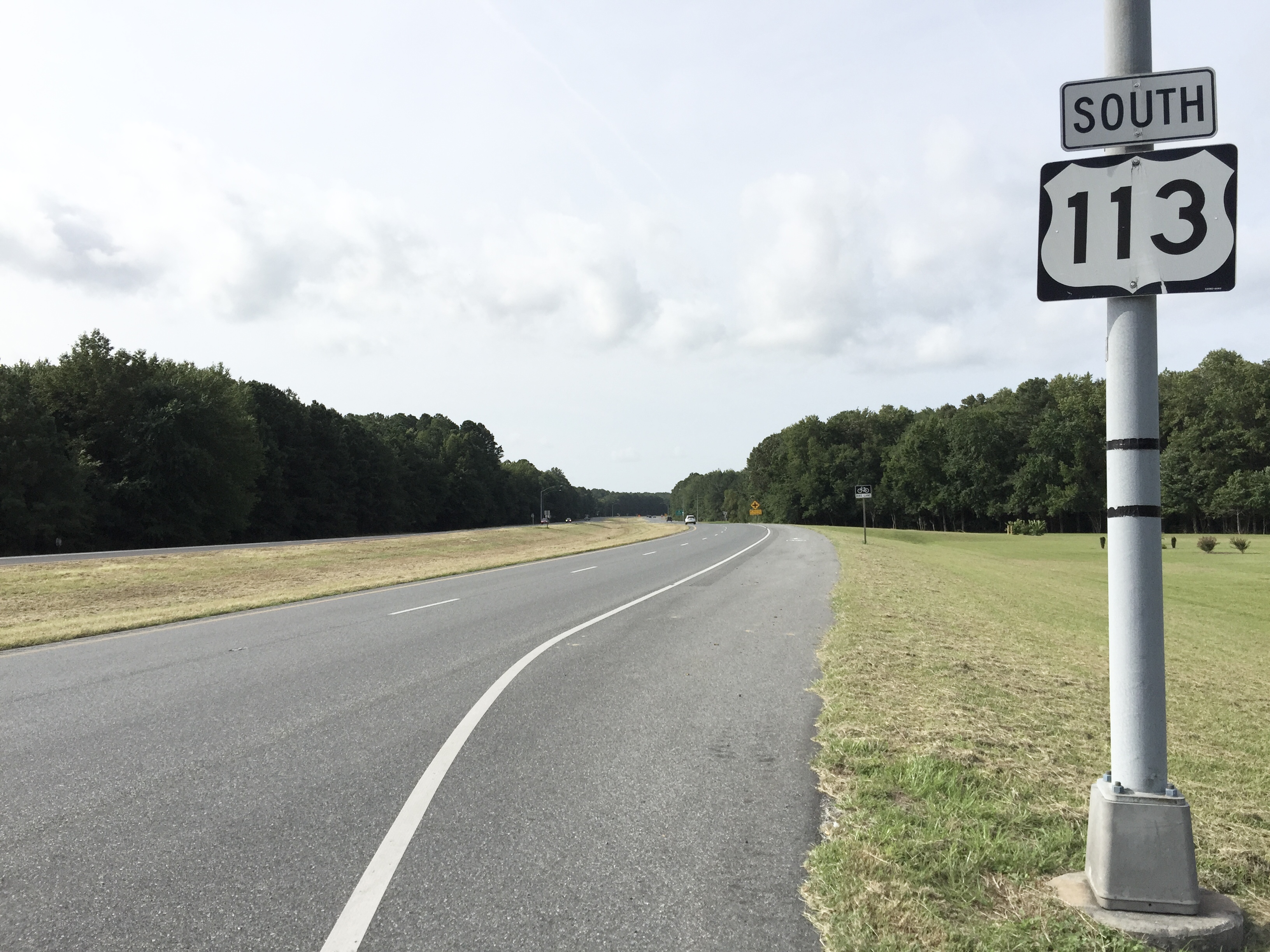
View south along US 113 at MD 756 near Pocomoke City

US 113 begins at the city limit of Pocomoke City at an intersection with US 13 (Ocean Highway), the main highway of the Delmarva Peninsula that connects Wilmington and Dover with Salisbury and Norfolk. Old Virginia Road (unsigned MD 250A) continues west to US 13 Business (Market Street). US 13 Business heads north through the Pocomoke City Historic District, which preserves buildings from Pocomoke City's late 19th century and early 20th century heyday as a river port and station on the main rail line of the Delmarva Peninsula.

US 113 heads northeast from US 13 as a four-lane divided highway and intersects American Legion Drive (unsigned MD 359B), which leads to MD 359 (Bypass Road). The U.S. Highway crosses Town Branch, a tributary of the Pocomoke River, and leaves the Pocomoke City area after intersecting MD 756 (Old Snow Hill Road). US 113 parallels the left bank of the Pocomoke River and crosses many streams that drain into the river, including Pilchard Creek, Bachelors Branch, Mataponi Creek, Corkers Creek, and Hardship Branch. US 113 passes through Pocomoke State Forest, which preserves loblolly pine stands and bald cypress swamps along the Maryland Scenic River; by the Pocomoke River Wildlife Management Area, in which dove hunting regularly occurs; and by the Shad Landing unit of Pocomoke River State Park, which offers boating, fishing, and a nature center.

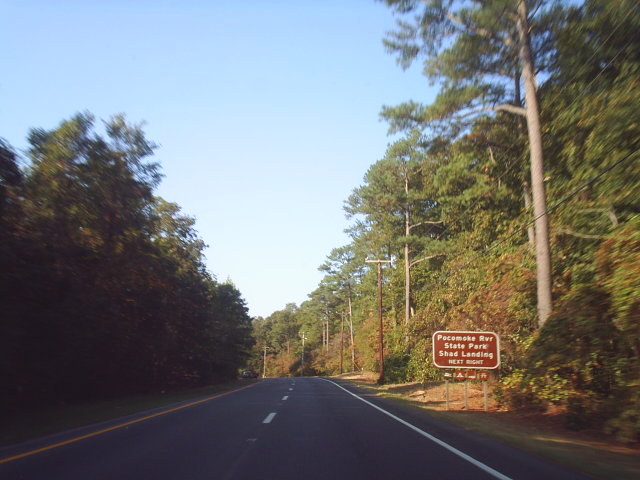
US 113 southbound south of Snow Hill

Northeast of the state park entrance, US 113 Business (Market Street) splits to the northeast to directly serve the town of Snow Hill, which is the county seat of Worcester County and contains several museums and colonial era buildings of the river port at the head of navigation of the Pocomoke River. US 113 bypasses the town to the south and east, coming to a northbound weigh station a short distance past the US 113 Business intersection, and intersects MD 12 (Snow Hill Road), which connects Snow Hill with e Salisbury and Stockton, and MD 365 (Public Landing Road). The MD 365 junction is a superstreet intersection; MD 365 traffic must turn right, use U-turn ramps along US 113, and turn right again to continue on MD 365. North of MD 365, the highway crosses Purnell Branch of the Pocomoke River. US 113 has a grade crossing with the Snow Hill Line of the Maryland and Delaware Railroad and turns northeast again as the highway receives the other end of US 113 Business.

==== Snow Hill to Berlin ====
US 113 continues northeast, crosses Poorhouse Branch of the Pocomoke River, and passes west of Worcester Technical High School. North of its crossing of Five Mile Branch, the highway veers away from the Pocomoke River and enters the Atlantic seaboard watershed US 113 parallels the rail line before it intersects the rail line at an oblique grade crossing at Newark Road and crosses Marshall Creek, which flows into Newport Bay. The highway passes to the south of the village of Newark, which contains the Queponco Railway Station, a preserved Pennsylvania Railroad station. Further north, US 113 crosses Massey Branch. The highway crosses Porter Creek and Goody Hill Branch of Bassett Creek and passes through Ironshire, which contains the Federal-style plantation home Simpson's Grove.

US 113 crosses Poplartown Branch of Beaverdam Creek, passes the historic Italianate-style plantation home Merry Sherwood, and enters the town of Berlin at its southern junction with MD 818 (Main Street). MD 818 heads north through the Berlin Commercial District, which contains several museums and preserves buildings from the late 19th century when Berlin was at the intersection of two railroad lines. East of the town center, US 113 crosses Hudson Branch of Trappe Creek and intersects MD 376 (Bay Street) and MD 346 (Old Ocean City Boulevard). The U.S. Highway passes west of Atlantic General Hospital as it leaves the town of Berlin just south of its cloverleaf interchange with US 50 (Ocean Gateway), which connects Ocean City with Salisbury and the Chesapeake Bay Bridge. North of the interchange, within which the highways cross Kitts Branch, US 113 meets the northern end of MD 818 as it begins to closely parallel the Snow Hill Line.

==== Berlin to Selbyville ====
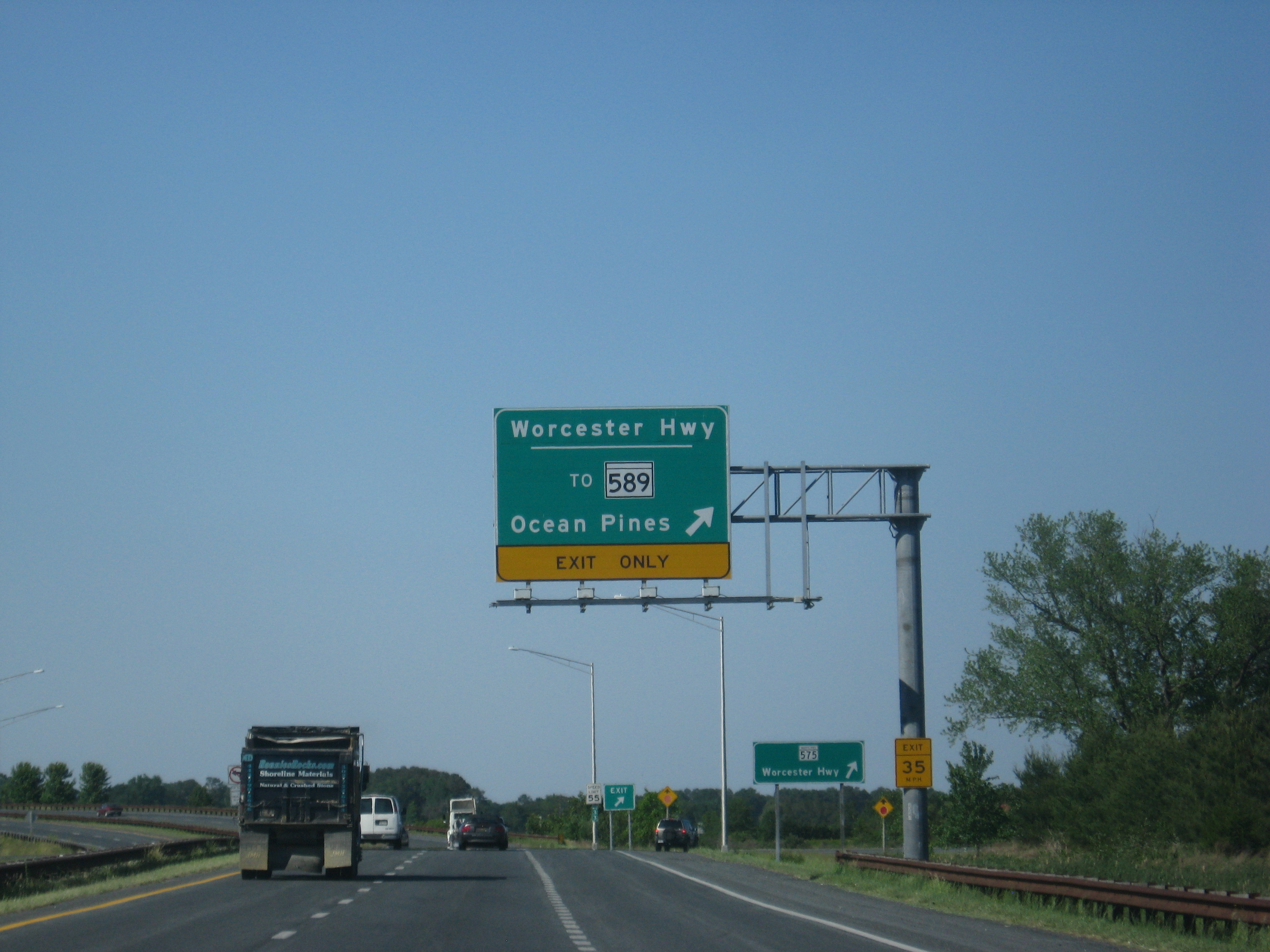
US 113 northbound at MD 589 north of Berlin

US 113 closely parallels the railroad west of Friendship to north of its right-in/right-out junction with MD 575 (Worcester Highway), an interchange only accessible to the northbound U.S. Highway. The route leaves the railroad track and meets MD 90 (Ocean City Expressway) at a partial cloverleaf interchange; MD 90 connects the northern part of Ocean City with US 50 west of Berlin. US 113 continues north to its interchange with the northern end of MD 575 and MD 589 (Racetrack Road), which leads to Ocean Pines and Ocean Downs, a harness racing track with a casino. The exit ramp from northbound US 113 intersects MD 575 a short distance south of its intersection with MD 589, and the southbound ramps connect with West Frontage Road (unsigned MD 575A), which serves St. Martin's Episcopal Church.

US 113 continues through Showell, where the U.S. Highway crosses Church Branch, Middle Branch, and Birch Branch; these three streams together form Shingle Landing Prong of the St. Martin River, which empties into Isle of Wight Bay, a lagoon on the west side of Ocean City. Within Showell, the highway parallels Old US 113 (unsigned MD 575B), which is accessed at its south end with a right-in/right-out junction with southbound US 113 and full access via Shingle Landing Road. US 113 intersects MD 367 (Bishopville Road) at Bishop and has an oblique grade crossing with the rail line, then the route intersects the east end of MD 610 (Whaleyville Road). The U.S. Highway crosses Carey Branch, which flows into the Bishopville Prong of the St. Martin River, before it enters Delaware at the Transpeninsular Line, one of the lines surveyed as part of the 18th-century Penn–Calvert boundary dispute.

=== Delaware ===
US 113 has a length of 37.26 miles (59.96 km) in Delaware, where the route is named DuPont Boulevard. The highway extends the north–south length of Sussex County and into far southern Kent County. US 113 runs from Selbyville at the Maryland state line north to Milford, a city that lies in both Sussex and Kent counties. Between those municipalities, US 113 serves the towns of Frankford, Dagsboro, Millsboro, Georgetown, and Ellendale. The U.S. Highway intersects several east–west highways that connect US 113 with the Delaware beach towns to the east, including Lewes, Rehoboth Beach, Dewey Beach, Bethany Beach, and Fenwick Island. The following includes a description of US 113's former course from Milford to Dover, most of which is now solely DE 1.

==== Selbyville to Georgetown ====
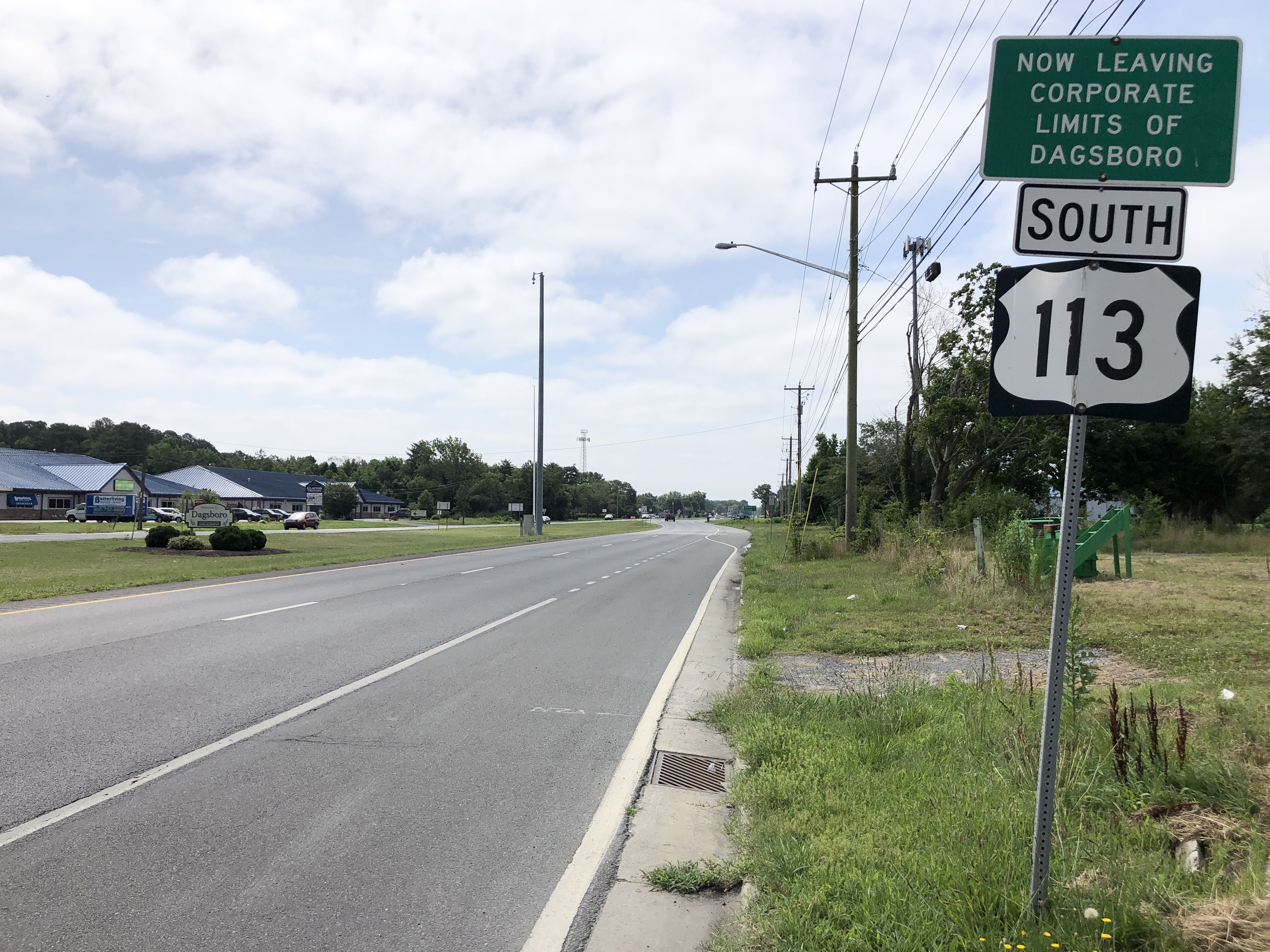
US 113 southbound past DE 26 in Dagsboro

US 113 enters Sussex County to the east of the Great Cypress Swamp in the town of Selbyville, which was a center of strawberry production from the 19th century to the 1930s. The highway crosses Sandy Branch and intersects DE 54 (Cemetery Road/Cypress Road), which heads east to Fenwick Island. The U.S. Highway heads north parallel to the Maryland and Delaware Railroad to the town of Frankford, which was founded around a country store and the site of the Gothic Revival home of Captain Ebe Chandler. The highway crosses Vines Creek, the southernmost of several Indian River tributaries the route crosses, and passes along the western edge of the town. US 113 continues northwest parallel to the rail line, which north of Frankford is operated by the Delmarva Central Railroad as the Indian River Subdivision line.

US 113 next comes to the town of Dagsboro, which is named for French and Indian War and American Revolutionary War general and major Sussex County landowner John Dagworthy. The highway crosses Pepper Creek and intersects DE 26 (Clayton Street/Nine Foot Road), which heads east to Bethany Beach, while it passes through the western fringe of the town. North of Dagsboro, US 113 crosses Whartons Branch before it intersects DE 20 (Dagsboro Road); the U.S. Highway and state highway run concurrently through the town of Millsboro, which was named for the cluster of mills around the head of navigation of the Indian River. The highways cross Iron Branch before they intersect DE 24 (Laurel Road/Washington Street) west of the town center. After crossing Betts Pond, DE 20 splits to the northwest as Hardscrabble Road as US 113 itself turns northwest toward the hamlet of Stockley. North of Stockley, US 113 intersects the western terminus of DE 24 Alternate (Speedway Road) west of Georgetown Speedway and passes west of the Sussex Correctional Institution.

US 113 enters the town of Georgetown, which was founded as a more central county seat for Sussex County in 1791, at its junction with South Bedford Street. North of here, the route intersects Arrow Safety Road, which is marked US 9 Truck and DE 404 Truck. The truck routes, which bypass the downtown area of Georgetown, join US 113 to return to their respective mainline highways on the west side of downtown. US 9 Truck ends at the intersection with US 9 (County Seat Highway/Market Street) on the west side of Georgetown. Along with DE 404, US 9 heads east toward Delaware Coastal Airport, the original county seat of Lewes, the Cape May–Lewes Ferry, Rehoboth Beach, and Dewey Beach. North of the center of town, US 113 intersects DE 18/DE 404 (Seashore Highway/Bridgeville Road), which head west toward Bridgeville and the Chesapeake Bay Bridge. The U.S. Highway meets North Bedford Street at the north town limit of Georgetown, where it passes east of a park and pool lot located at a church.

==== Georgetown to Milford ====
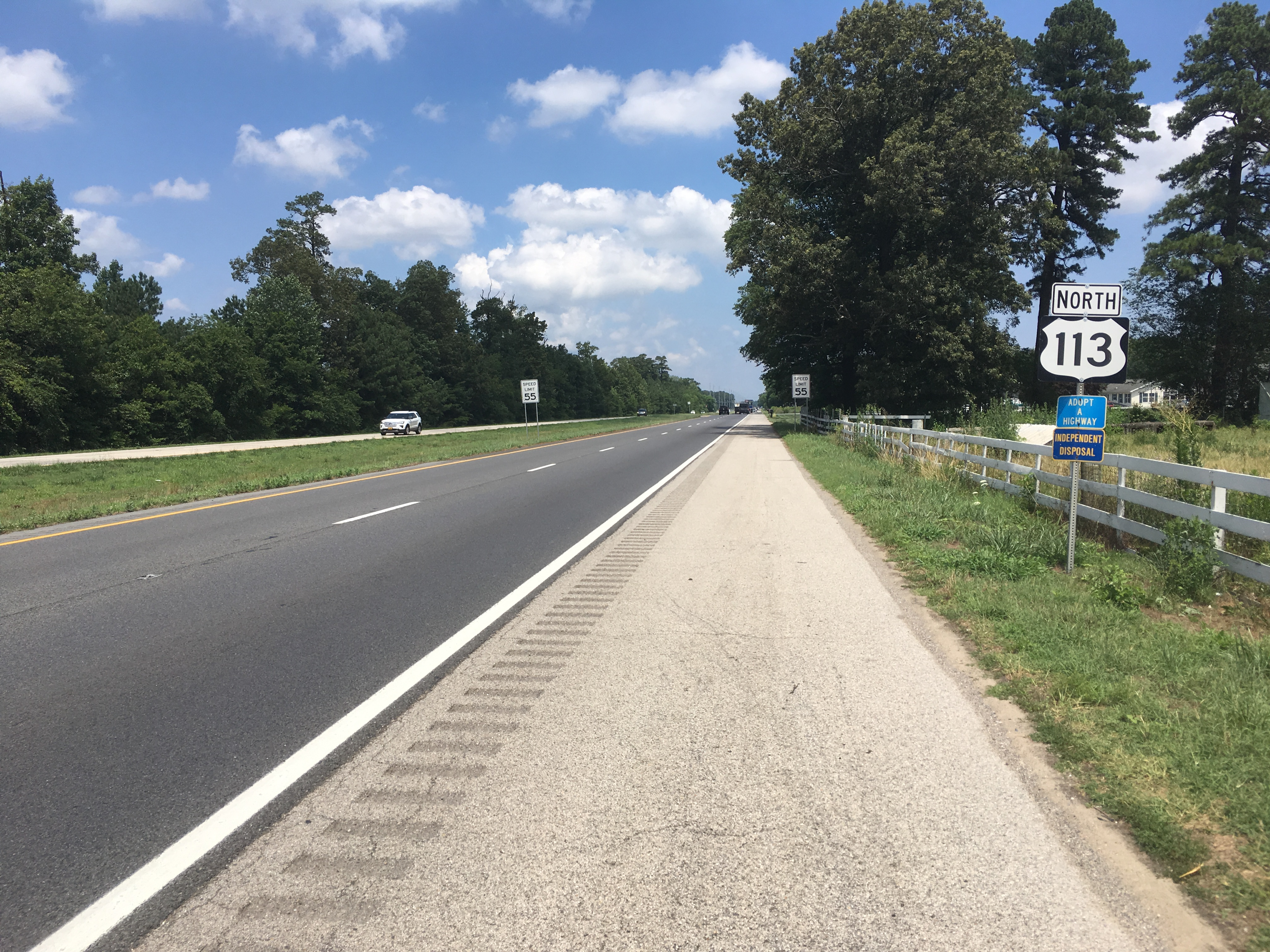
US 113 northbound south of Milford

US 113 continues northwest through Redden State Forest, whose loblolly pines occupy several disjoint tracts between Georgetown and Ellendale. The state forest originated as a Pennsylvania Railroad hunting preserve in the early 20th century, and the hunting lodge, forester's house, and stable is preserved and today used as the Redden Forest Education Center east of the hamlet of Redden. In this community, the road has an intersection with Redden Road. The U.S. Highway also passes near McColley's Chapel and crosses Gravelly Branch, one of the headwaters of the Nanticoke River, north of Redden. US 113 curves north and passes by the Ellendale State Forest Picnic Facility, a picnic area accessible from the northbound direction that the Civilian Conservation Corps constructed in the late 1930s for tourists and long-distance travelers. West of the town of Ellendale, which flourished in the late 19th century as a railroad town at the junction of perpendicular rail lines, the highway intersects DE 16 (Beach Highway/Milton Ellendale Highway) and passes west of Teddy's Tavern, which was built in 1923 as the Blue Hen Garage to serve travelers on the DuPont Highway.

North of Ellendale, US 113 enters the Delaware Bay watershed; the highway crosses Cedar Creek to the west of Hudson Pond and passes to the west of the unincorporated community of Lincoln at the intersection with Fitzgeralds Road/Johnson Road. The highway continues into the city of Milford, which was founded in the early 19th century at the head of navigation of the Mispillion River whose antebellum buildings, late 19th-century buildings, and shipbuilding heritage are preserved, respectively, in the North Milford, South Milford, and Milford Shipyard Area historic districts. US 113 intersects DE 36 (Shawnee Road/Lakeview Avenue) on the southwest side of town before crossing the river into Kent County between two of its impoundments, Silver Lake to the east and Haven Lake to the west. The highway has a grade crossing of the Delmarva Central Railroad's Indian River Subdivision track and a junction with DE 14 (Milford Harrington Highway/Northwest Front Street). On the north side of Milford, US 113 passes the historic Walnut Farm and heads east of a park and ride lot at a local business before it intersects DE 1 Business (North Walnut Street) obliquely. DE 1 Business joins US 113 in a short concurrency that ends when both the state business loop and the U.S. Highway reach their respective northern terminus at a partial interchange with DE 1. There is no direct access from northbound US 113 to southbound DE 1 or from northbound DE 1 to southbound US 113.

==== Former route from Milford to Dover ====
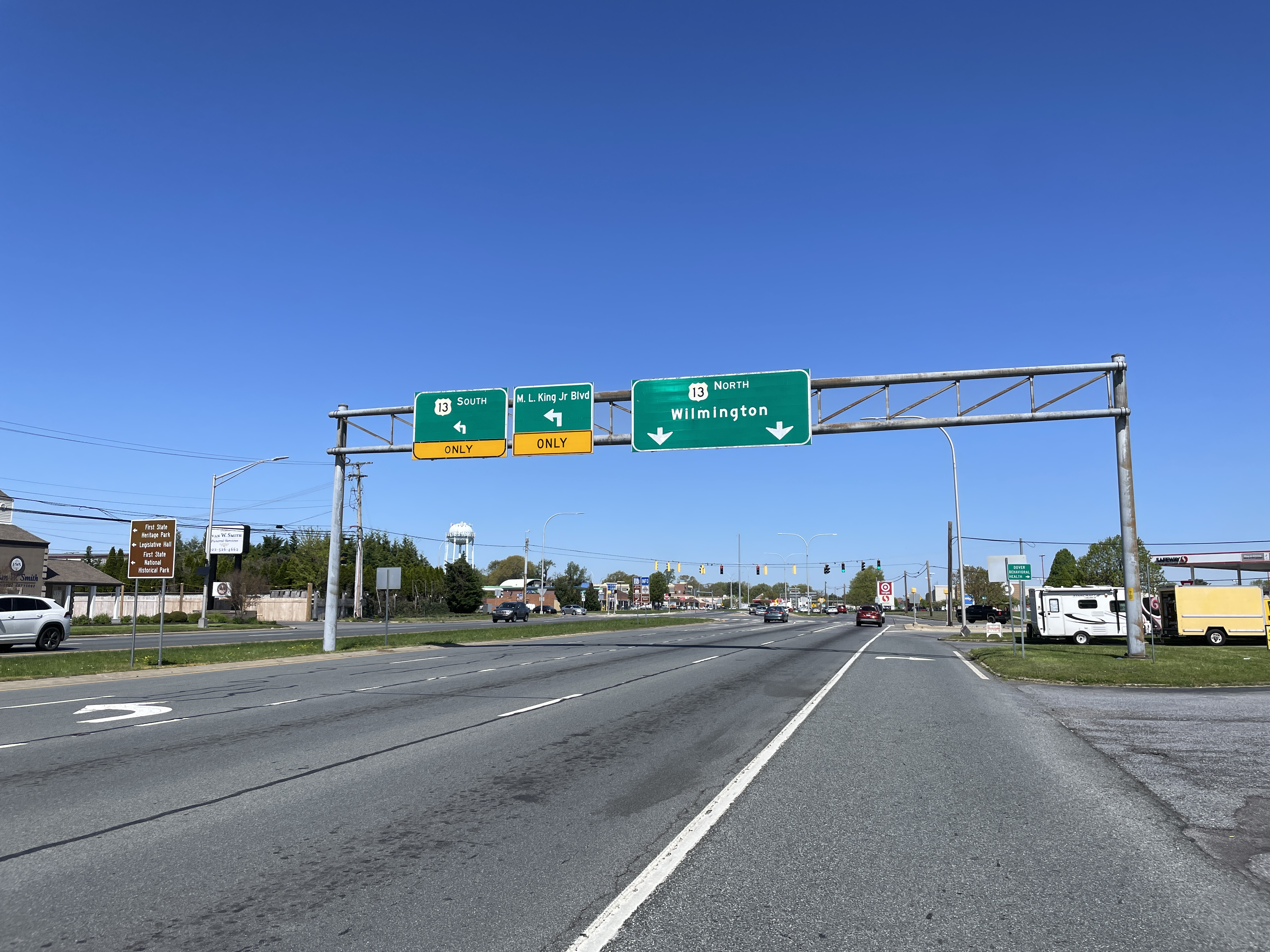
Bay Road (former US 113) northbound approaching its terminus at US 13 in Dover

Until 2003, US 113 continued north from Milford concurrently with DE 1 along four-lane divided Bay Road to Dover. Soon after US 113 joined DE 1, the roadway crossed Swan Creek to the east of Tub Mill Pond. The route headed north and intersected Thompsonville Road before crossing Old Baptist Church Branch. The U.S. Highway crossed the Murderkill River while passing to the east of the town of Frederica. At the north end of Frederica, the highway met the eastern end of DE 12 (Frederica Road). US 113 passed west of historic Barratt's Chapel, the birthplace of Methodism in the United States. The highway intersected Bowers Beach Road before it met the southern end of US 113 Alternate (Clapham Road) at a Y intersection in the village of Little Heaven. US 113 crossed the St. Jones River on the Barkers Landing Bridge and curved northwest at its intersections with the southern end of DE 9 (Bayside Drive) and the western end of Kitts Hummock Road. The highway became a freeway along the edge of Dover Air Force Base. US 113 had a diamond interchange with Old Lebanon Road, which served the Main Gate of the air force base to the northeast and base housing to the southwest. At the next interchange, a partial cloverleaf interchange with the eastern end of DE 10 (Lebanon Road) next to the military base's North Gate, US 113 exited onto Bay Road while DE 1 continued on the Korean War Veterans Memorial Highway. The U.S. Highway had ramps from northbound US 113 to northbound DE 1, from southbound US 113 to southbound DE 1, and from southbound DE 1 to US 113 just south of its partial interchange with the Puncheon Run Connector freeway, which connected DE 1 and US 113 with US 13 on the south side of Dover. US 113 entered the city of Dover and passed between the DelDOT headquarters to the west and the Blue Hen Corporate Center to the east, which was transformed into a corporate center from the defunct Blue Hen Mall in 1995. The route intersected Court Street (named Martin Luther King Jr. Boulevard since 2013)/South Little Creek Road, with Court Street heading west to the Dover Green Historic District and Delaware Legislative Hall, before reaching its northern terminus at a Y intersection with US 13 and the northern end of US 113 Alternate (DuPont Highway).

== History ==
=== Predecessor roads ===
The original highway along much of the US 113 corridor was a post road established in the late 18th century that connected Horn Town on the Eastern Shore of Virginia with Snow Hill, Berlin, Selbyville, Georgetown, Milford, and Dover, ultimately leading to Wilmington and Philadelphia. The Dover–Milford portion of the post road followed the King's Highway established in the late 17th century to connect Dover with Lewes, the original county seat of Sussex County. South of Milford, the post road followed a stage road from Dover to Dagsboro constructed to connect the new county seat of Georgetown with Dover in the 1790s. A 1796 act of the Delaware General Assembly called for surveying a straighter 30-foot-wide (9.1 m) clear path in Sussex County from Milford through Georgetown and Dagsboro to the Maryland state line, a highway that became known as the State Road by the mid-19th century. In Maryland, the post road followed what is now MD 12 from the Virginia state line through Stockton to Snow Hill and the Old Stage Road from north of Showell to the Delaware state line, and a separate road connected Pocomoke City and Snow Hill. By 1898, the dirt road from Pocomoke City to Berlin via Snow Hill was the main thoroughfare of Worcester County.

With few exceptions, these roads remained rudimentary and were impassible in bad weather and a nuisance in good weather, which limited the economic possibilities of those regions of Delaware and Maryland. The Good Roads Movement in the 1890s and 1900s spurred investment and advocacy for constructing all-weather roads that connected the population centers of the states, although the instigating forces in each state were different. State agencies in Maryland spearheaded the tasks of studying the issues and recommending increasingly effective courses of action. In Delaware, it was the philanthropic measure of a worldly man of one of Delaware's leading families that brought good roads to much of the state.

==== Maryland state roads ====
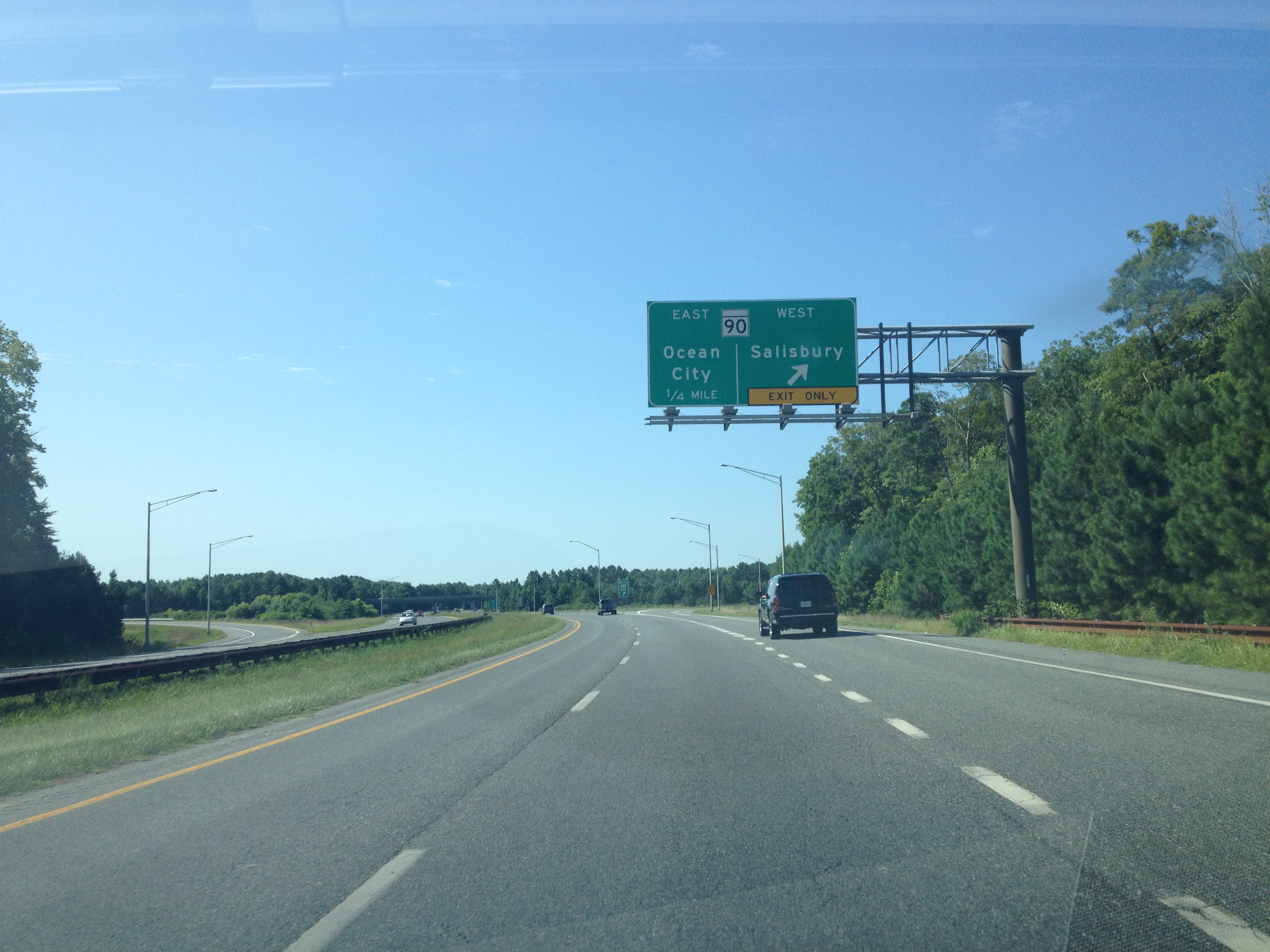
US 113 southbound at the interchange with MD 90 in Friendship

The Maryland Geological Survey was formed in 1896 to study the state's natural resources. Within two years, the agency determined that road building was an area that required extensive study and promotion, so the agency requested and received authorization from the Maryland General Assembly to create a Highway Division to study the state of highways in Maryland and propose engineering and legislative solutions to the state's transportation problems. One of those solutions passed by the General Assembly was the 1904 State Aid Highway Law, also known as the Shoemaker Law, which offered the counties and municipalities expert advice and technical assistance from the Maryland Geological Survey and funding for one half of the cost of macadam roads constructed by the county. The first improved highways along what became US 113 in Worcester County were constructed under the provisions of the 1904 law. Worcester County constructed three mile-long macadam roads that became US 113 with state aid: from the south town limit of Berlin to Hayes Landing Road in 1907, from the east town limit of Snow Hill to Purnells Mill Pond in 1907 and 1908, and from the north town limit of Berlin toward Showell in 1909 and 1910.

However, as in the remainder of the state, the State Aid Road Law was insufficient to form a statewide or even countywide network of all-weather roads, so in 1908 the General Assembly passed the State Road Law, which established the Maryland SRC to take over the state-aid support of the Maryland Geological Survey's Highway Division and construct, using state or state-contracted forces, a statewide system of roads to connect Baltimore and the state's county seats to each other. The system proposed in 1909 included the Pocomoke City–Snow Hill and Snow Hill–Berlin roads. Due to a lack of satisfactory contractor bids, the Maryland SRC contracted Worcester County forces to construct the state road between Snow Hill and Berlin. The county began constructing a 12-foot-wide (3.7 m) macadam road between the ends of the state-aid sections in 1910. The section from Snow Hill to Newark was completed in 1911, and the remainder to Berlin was completed the following year.

Construction on the Pocomoke City–Snow Hill road was started from the Pocomoke City end in 1911. The first three sections were completed as 12-foot-wide (3.7 m) macadam roads from Pocomoke City east to Outens Entrance in 1911, from Snow Hill west to Hardship Branch in 1912, and from Outens Entrance to Betheden Church in 1914. The final section, from Betheden Church to Hardship Branch, was constructed as a 14-foot-wide (4.3 m) concrete road. The highway from the state-aid section on the north side of Berlin to Showell was constructed as a 15-foot-wide (4.6 m) concrete road in 1917 and 1918. A 15-foot-wide (4.6 m) concrete road was built north from Showell along a new alignment to tie in with the southern end of the DuPont Highway at Selbyville in 1921. By 1923, the town of Snow Hill resurfaced its Main Street and turned it over to the Maryland SRC, and Berlin gave its concrete Main Street to the state for maintenance, completing the highway from Pocomoke City to the Delaware state line.

==== DuPont Highway ====
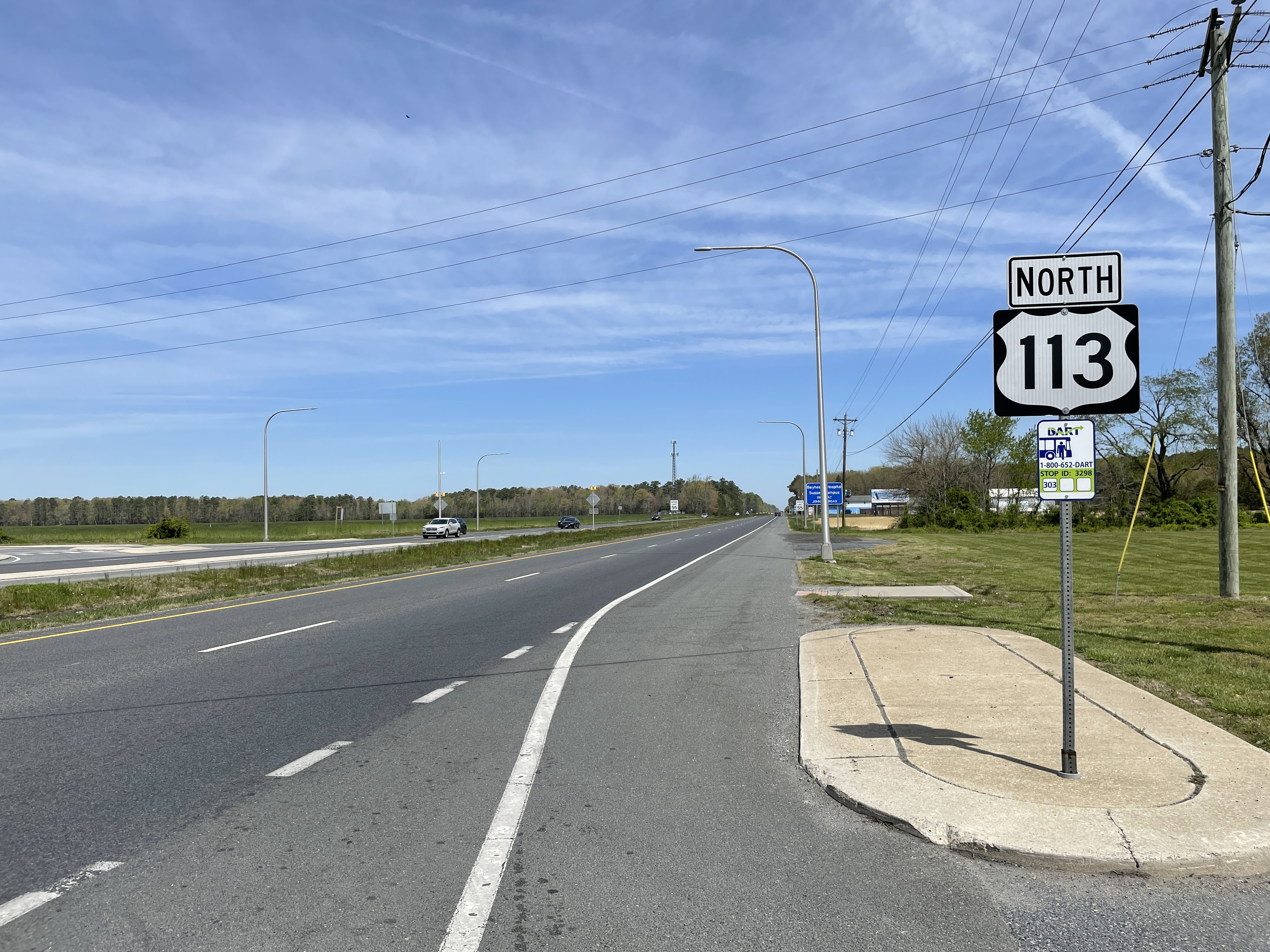
US 113 northbound past DE 16 near Ellendale

The Delaware General Assembly approved a state-aid road law in 1903, but the law was repealed in 1905. Instead, the driving force for the construction of what became the Delaware portion of US 113 was Thomas Coleman DuPont, who offered to fund and construct a modern highway from Selbyville to Wilmington as a philanthropic measure. Inspired by the great boulevards of Europe and cognizant of the need for a main north–south highway as the backbone of a well-laid-out system of roads in Delaware, DuPont envisioned a 200-foot (61 m) right-of-way that contained a 40-foot-wide (12 m) high-speed automobile highway flanked by dual trolley tracks, roadways for heavy vehicle traffic, unpaved roadways for horses above buried utility lines, and sidewalks at the outer edge of the right-of-way. The construction costs of the road would be recovered by trolley franchises and utility line rentals. After sections of the highway were built, they would be turned over without charge to the state, which would maintain the road.

Despite these grand visions, in the end the DuPont Highway was constructed in Sussex County as a 14-foot (4.3 m) wide concrete roadway on the proposed 200-foot (61 m) right-of-way. The Delaware General Assembly passed the Boulevard Corporation Act of 1911, which authorized the formation of Coleman DuPont Road, Inc., to acquire land and construct a highway the length of the state. Construction of the first section of the highway began near Selbyville on September 18, 1911. By 1912, construction was interrupted by litigation challenging both the constitutionality of the law establishing the road building corporation and the need for DuPont to acquire such a large right-of-way. DuPont offered to make concessions, such as agreeing to pay up to five times the assessed value of a farmer's land five years after the road's completion and reducing the width of the corridor of land to be acquired to 100 feet (30 m). Construction on the highway resumed in 1915 after the litigation had taken its course. The first two sections of the highway, from Selbyville to Georgetown and from Georgetown to the Appenzellar farm 6 miles (9.7 km) south of Milford, were completed on May 24, 1917.

The Delaware General Assembly created the DSHD in 1917 to lay out, construct, and maintain highways and to meet organizational requirements to receive federal aid through the Federal Aid Road Act of 1916. On July 20, 1918, DuPont reached an agreement with the state of Delaware for the newly formed DSHD to construct the remaining sections of the highway. DuPont would dissolve Coleman DuPont Road, Inc., and finance the remainder of construction up to $44,000 per mile ($27,000/km), which is equivalent to $610,000 per mile ($380,000/km) in 2024. The highway department would complete the road to Milford along the lines designed by DuPont's company. DSHD would both design and construct the DuPont Highway north of Milford; the department decided on a 60-foot-wide (18 m) right-of-way for future sections of the highway. The portions from north of Ellendale to north of Milford, from Frederica to Little Heaven, and through Rising Sun were completed by 1920. All other portions of the DuPont Highway between Ellendale and Dover were under construction in 1920 and completed by 1923, the same year the last section of the entire Selbyville–Wilmington highway was completed near Odessa.

Despite DuPont's grand boulevard not coming to fruition, he was a visionary who implemented key practices before they became standard in the decades after he initiated his project. After his death in 1930, DuPont was recognized for foreseeing that traffic on highways would approach the speed and volume of railroads and planning with provisions for future needs. Based on that vision, he designed his highway with a wide right-of-way and curves and grades adequate for high-speed traffic. The DuPont Highway was also innovative as one of the earliest roads to be constructed on a new alignment that passed close to towns but not directly through them, a development that was more convenient for through traffic and less disruptive to a town's residents. Up to that point, the use of bypasses had been limited to the railroads. South of Milford, the DuPont Highway was constructed entirely on new alignment except from Bedford Street north of Georgetown to Old State Road at Redden. The portion of the highway north of Milford, which DSHD designed, mostly overlaid the existing Milford–Dover highway. The two exceptions were through Frederica, where the State Road used Market Street, and between Milford and Frederica, where the State Road followed Jenkins Pond Road, Reynolds Road, Pritchett Road, and Milford Neck Road.

=== Widening and early bypasses ===
The DuPont Highway was a boon to southern Delaware, which had formerly been economically isolated from the large cities of the northeast. In conjunction with the rise of the automobile, the highway spurred the growth of the Delaware Beaches by greatly improving access to the coast for tourists from northern Delaware and adjacent portions of the Northeast megalopolis. Southern Delaware also developed into a major truck farming region due to having much greater access to urban markets. No longer fully reliant on the railroads to transport their goods, farmers in Sussex and Kent counties could market their fruits, vegetables, and broiler chickens directly to consumers in the north. However, the passenger and freight traffic induced by this increased economic integration and the automobile boom of the 1920s meant that these roads in Delaware and Maryland constructed in the 1910s and 1920s, which were built with widths of 12 to 15 feet (3.7 to 4.6 m), were no longer adequate for the traffic they served. In particular, by 1929 the Selbyville–Milford portion of the DuPont Highway was the only through highway in Delaware with a width of less than 16 feet (4.9 m). The highway's importance was further implied when the Pocomoke City to Dover highway became part of the United States Numbered Highway System. The Pocomoke City–Dover route was designated Route No. 113 in the preliminary system proposed in November 1925, and that number and course were confirmed in the system AASHO and the Bureau of Public Roads approved in November 1926. The U.S. Highway's original southern terminus was the intersection of Market Street and Sixth Street in Pocomoke City. US 113's northern terminus was the split between the two main north–south highways of southern Delaware at Coopers Corner north of Puncheon Run on the southern edge of Dover.

==== Interwar period widening and bypasses ====
In Delaware, the 14-foot-wide (4.3 m) DuPont Highway was widened to 18 feet (5.5 m) with the addition of 4-foot-wide (1.2 m) concrete shoulders from Selbyville to Georgetown in 1930 and from Georgetown to Milford in 1931. In 1931, the highway department identified the need to expand the highway to 20 feet (6.1 m) from Milford to Dover, and this widening was completed in 1933. In 1930, Governors Avenue was reconstructed as a 20-foot-wide (6.1 m) concrete road and extended to become the new route of US 13 through Dover. US 113 was then extended north along State Street to a new terminus at the junction of State Street and Governors Avenue on the south side of Silver Lake.

In 1931, DSHD began construction on the first bypass of Dover. Much of the bypass would use Bay Road, the existing highway from modern DE 8 (North Little Creek Road) in Dover to Kitts Hummock on Delaware Bay. The Dover–Kitts Hummock road had been completed as a 12-foot-wide (3.7 m) concrete road in 1926. Two sections of new highway were planned from DE 8 to State Street north of downtown Dover and from the DuPont Highway in Little Heaven north to Bay Road at what is now DE 1's interchange with DE 9 (Bayside Drive) at the southern end of Dover Air Force Base. The new highway between Little Heaven and Bay Road would cross the St. Jones River at a site called Barkers Landing.

Between December 1931 and the end of 1933, DSHD constructed a causeway across 3,150 feet (960 m) of the marsh on the east bank of the river, a process that required multiple applications of fill dirt and dynamite to create a stable surface for a modern highway. A 180-foot-long (55 m) Scherzer rolling lift bascule bridge with a 50-foot (15 m) clear opening was constructed across the St. Jones River in 1933 and 1934. Bay Road was widened and the new sections of highway were built with 20-foot-wide (6.1 m) concrete pavement starting in 1934. The new highway was constructed with provisions for later being expanded to a divided highway. US 113 was relocated to the Dover Bypass, which was also known as the Eastern Boulevard, north to US 13 (State Street) when the new highway opened by the last weekend of May 1935. DuPont Highway between Little Heaven and Dover and State Street in Dover were designated US 113 Alternate.

The first improvements to US 113 in Maryland were the widening of 5 miles (8.0 km) of the Snow Hill–Berlin road with the addition of a pair of 2-foot-wide (0.61 m) macadam shoulders in 1926. By the end of 1930, the widening of the Snow Hill–Berlin road to 18 feet (5.5 m) was completed. State forces widened the Berlin–Delaware state line road to 18 feet (5.5 m) around 1930; this work included a curve modification at the railroad crossing north of Berlin. Widening of the Pocomoke City–Snow Hill road began in 1929. The first bypass along the route in Maryland was constructed to relieve congestion in Pocomoke City. The Public Works Administration, a New Deal federal program, partially funded the construction of a 20-foot-wide (6.1 m) concrete road along what is now MD 250A and MD 359 in 1935 and 1936. The original route of US 113 was redesignated MD 756 by 1946.

==== Post–World War II reconstruction ====
As early as 1933, two years before US 13 had been completed as a four-lane divided highway from Dover to Wilmington, Delawareans petitioned DSHD to extend the divided highway south to the Maryland state line at Selbyville or Delmar (US 13), a proposition DSHD acknowledged but deferred due to lack of funding, lack of proper planning, and higher priorities elsewhere in the state. Instead of adding divided highway in southern Delaware, DSHD needed to resolve the problem of the deterioration of 15- to 25-year-old concrete roads, such as those along the DuPont Highway. The department planned to address the issue by patching the concrete surface as needed, adding concrete shoulders, and applying a layer of bituminous concrete, more commonly known as asphalt concrete or blacktop, over the entire width of concrete to provide a wearing surface.

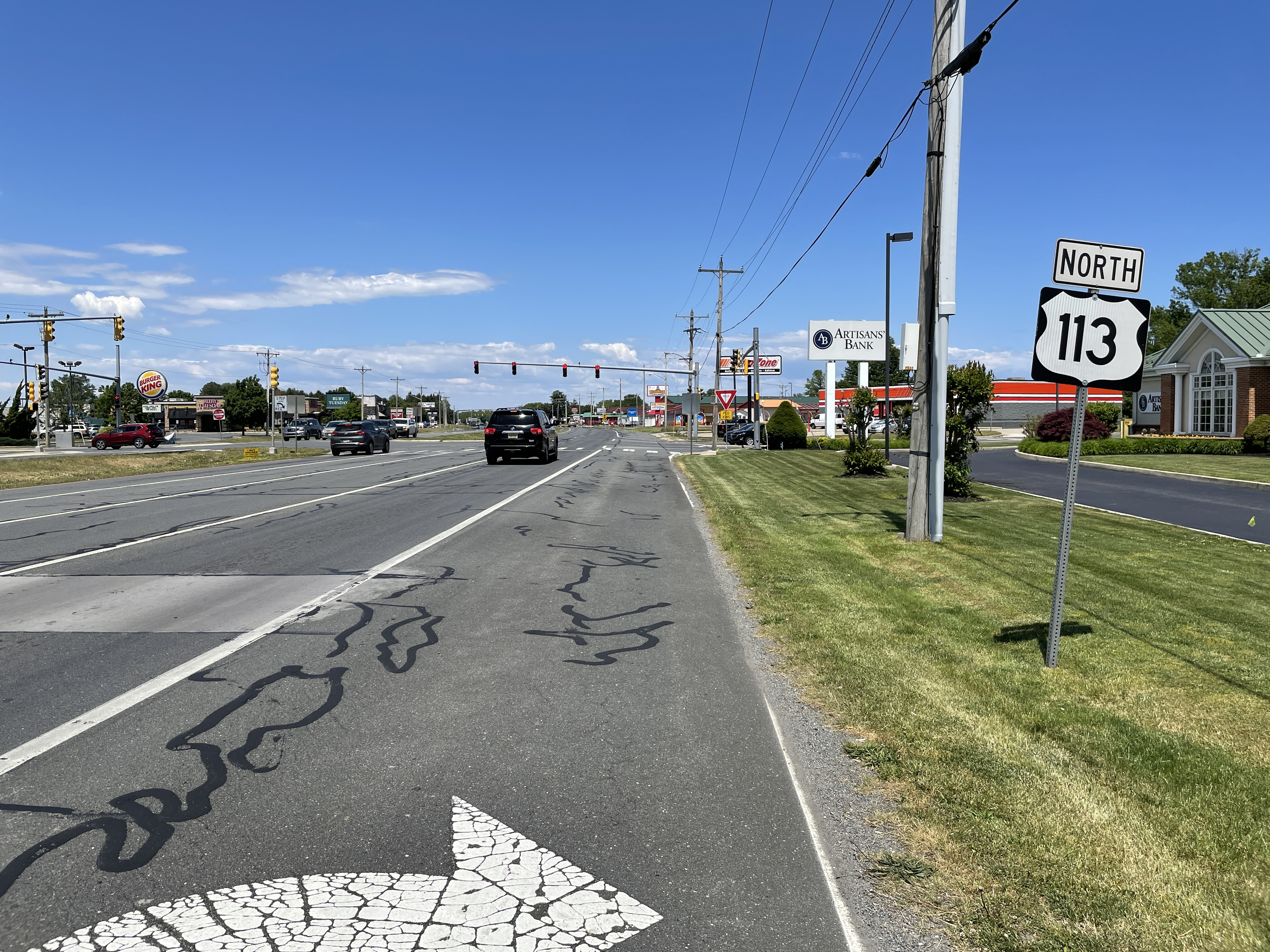
US 113 northbound in Milford

The first highway to be so treated was US 113 from Frederica to Little Heaven, which was resurfaced and widened to 23 feet (7.0 m) in 1941. DSHD included the highways between Dover and Milford and between Milford and Selbyville among those that should be reconstructed and resurfaced in the following four years, but that work was postponed due to the near-total cessation of highway construction projects during United States involvement in World War II. DSHD was able to resume this mode of highway reconstruction, which also included widening bridges and culverts, in 1944. This reconstruction plan returned to US 113 in 1946, when the highway between Ellendale and Georgetown was placed under reconstruction. The sections from Selbyville to Dagsboro, from Dagsboro to Georgetown, and from Milford to Little Heaven were expanded beginning in 1947. The post-war reconstruction and widening of US 113 to 22 feet (6.7 m) from Selbyville to the Dover Bypass in Little Heaven was completed with work on the U.S. Highway's Ellendale–Milford segment in 1949.

In 1934, MDSRC had recommended widening the entirety of US 113 from 15 to 18 feet (4.6 to 5.5 m) to 20 feet (6.1 m). Aside from the Pocomoke City Bypass, widening and reconstruction of the U.S. Highway in that state did not occur until after World War II. US 113 was widened and resurfaced from the north end of Berlin to the Delaware state line in 1947 and 1948 and from Pocomoke City to south of Snow Hill in 1948. The highway through Berlin was resurfaced in 1949. The U.S. route from the north end of Snow Hill to Newark was widened and resurfaced in 1951 and 1952. State forces reconstructed or widened seven bridges along the aforementioned widened sections in 1952 and 1953. US 113 through Snow Hill was reconstructed and widened in 1953 and 1954. The final two pieces of US 113 to be reconstructed were through Newark and Ironshire to the southern end of Berlin between 1954 and 1956. Instead of widening the existing highway, the U.S. Highway was built on mostly new alignment, with the northern segment through Ironshire constructed as the first carriageway of a future divided highway. The County Commissioners of Worcester County agreed to accept for maintenance the bypassed highways, Newark Road and Shire Drive, from Maryland SRC in March 1957.

=== Divided highway expansion ===
In 1940, DSHD initiated traffic surveys and studies to inform plans to construct a four-lane divided highway south from Dover. The studies, completed in 1942, found that US 13 from Delmar to Dover carried significantly more traffic than US 113 from Selbyville to Dover, so DSHD started planning for the divided highway to the Maryland state line to be along the US 13 corridor. However, DSHD also approved plans for expansion of US 113 to a divided highway from Milford to Little Heaven. DSHD completed the final link in the Dover–Delmar divided highway in 1957. As in Delaware, Maryland SRC prioritized completing expansion of US 13 to a four-lane highway from Virginia to Delaware, which was completed in 1966. By that time, only a small portion of US 113 around Berlin had been expanded to a divided highway.

==== Delaware divided highways ====
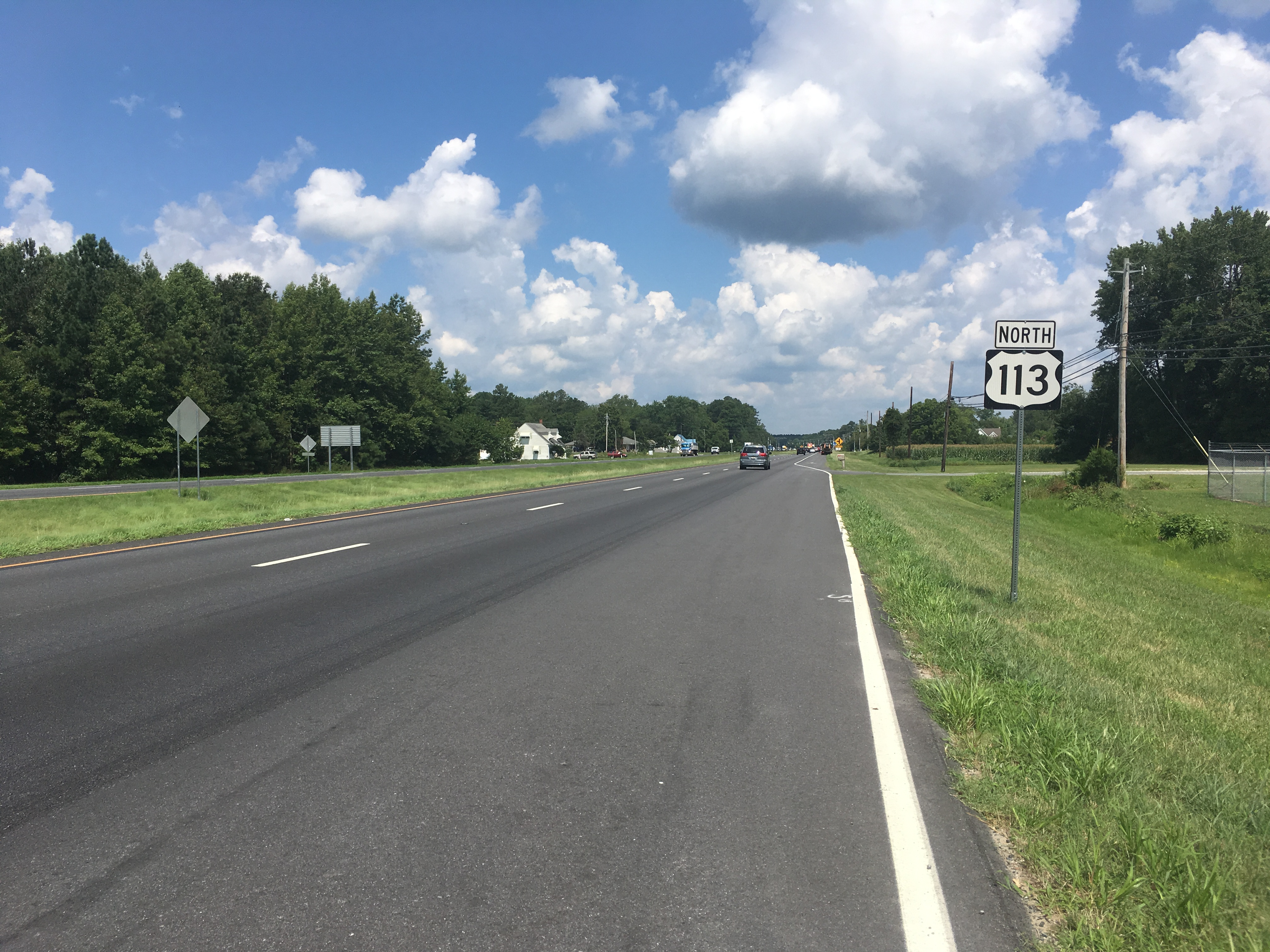
US 113 northbound leaving Georgetown

The first section of US 113 to be expanded to a divided highway was part of the new US 13 bypass of Dover. The latter highway's new four-lane course, which included a new bridge across the St. Jones River, was constructed starting in 1950 and opened to traffic April 16, 1952. As part of the project, the portion of US 113 from State Street north of Silver Lake to the new US 13 highway was expanded to a divided highway, and both U.S. Highways were marked on the expanded highway from State Street to their split at the modern intersection of US 13 and Bay Road. DSHD may have removed US 113 markers from north of Bay Road as early as 1965, and the American Association of State Highway and Transportation Officials (AASHTO) approved the northern terminus of the U.S. Highway being retracted from the north end of State Street to where US 13 meets Bay Road at their spring 1974 meeting. In conjunction, AASHTO approved removing US 113 Alternate from State Street north of US 13 and instead following US 13 to US 113's northern terminus.

The first divided highway project on US 113 proper began in 1957. The U.S. Highway's second carriageway was completed from its junction with US 13 and South Little Creek Road to the southern end of Dover Air Force Base in 1959. The first segment of the original DuPont Highway south of Dover to be expanded to a divided highway was from Walnut Street at the north end of Milford to south of Frederica; the southbound roadway of the divided highway section was constructed between 1957 and 1959. The US 113 divided highway was extended around Milford when the southbound carriageway was built from Walnut Street south to near Lincoln between 1961 and 1963; the project included a pair of bridges over the east end of Haven Lake at the Kent–Sussex county line. The Frederica bypass was constructed as a four-lane divided highway between 1963 and 1965. US 113 was expanded to a divided highway from just north of the Maryland state line in Selbyville to DE 20 north of Dagsboro between 1965 and 1967. The highway's second carriageway was built from north of Dagsboro to Stockley between 1966 and 1968. US 113 was completed as a divided highway from Stockley to North Bedford Street on the northern edge of Georgetown in 1969. US 113's partial interchange with the Milford Bypass opened in 1971.

==== Berlin and Snow Hill bypasses and Pocomoke to Snow Hill expansion ====
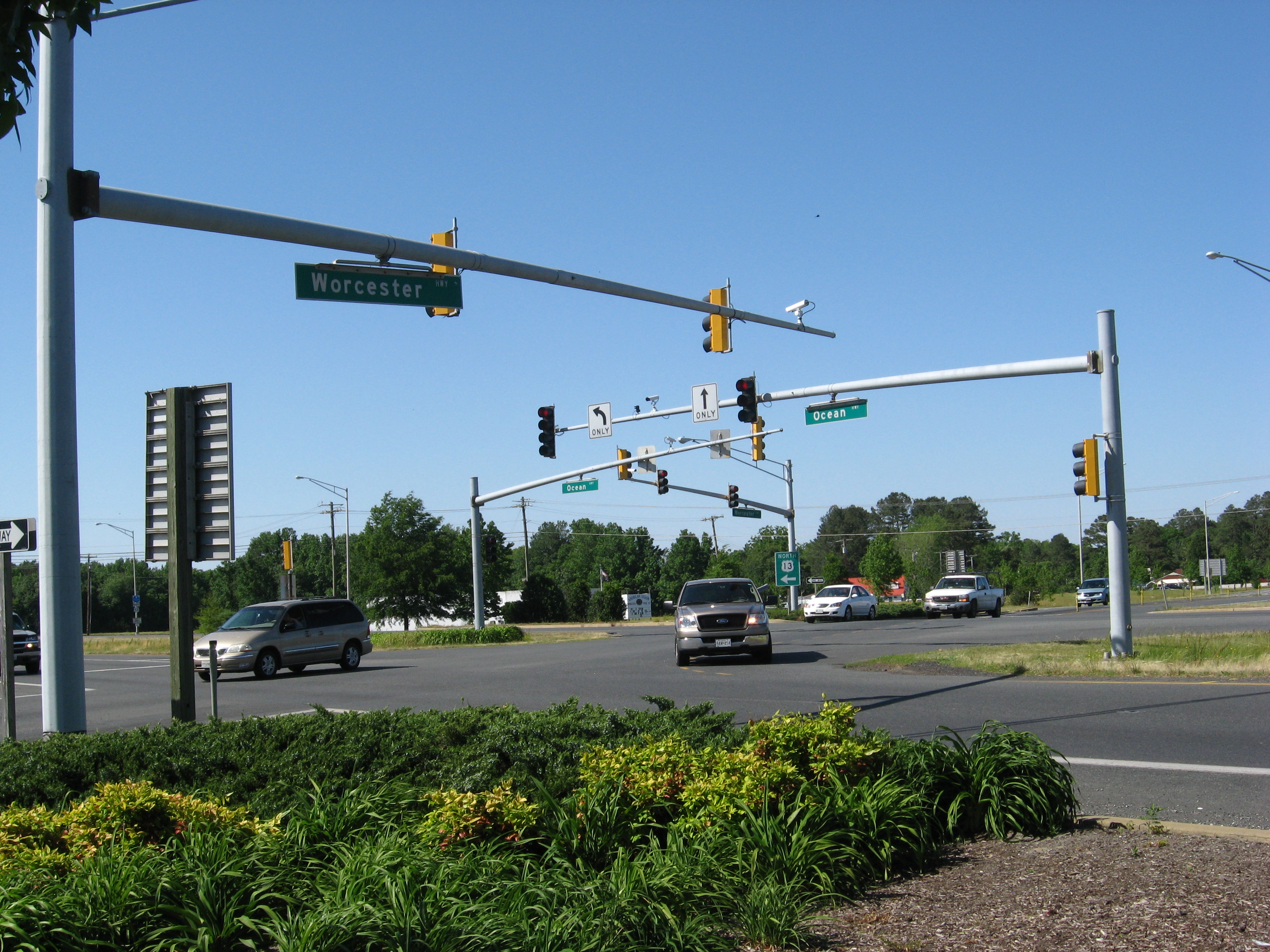
Southern terminus of US 113 at US 13 in Pocomoke City

The first divided highway project on US 113 in Maryland was the four-lane divided Berlin bypass, which was constructed between 1955 and 1957. A second carriageway was added to the existing highway from Hayes Landing Road to Main Street south of Berlin and for a short stretch north of Main Street on the north side of Berlin. Main Street through Berlin became MD 818 in 1958. When US 50's bypass of Berlin was built between 1957 and 1959, ramps from westbound US 50 to northbound US 113 and from eastbound US 50 to southbound US 113 were added. The remaining six ramps of the cloverleaf interchange and US 113's bridges across US 50 were completed in 1975 and 1976.

US 113's southern terminus was moved to its present intersection after US 13's bypass of Pocomoke City was completed in 1961; the segment of highway between US 13 and MD 675 (now US 13 Business) became an extension of MD 250A. The original Pocomoke City bypass from US 13 to MD 756 was resurfaced with bituminous concrete in 1969, the same year work began to establish a four-lane divided highway from Pocomoke City to Snow Hill. The second, northbound carriageway of the highway was constructed from east of Pilchard Creek to Blades Road between 1969 and 1971 and from Blades Road to the south end of the Snow Hill bypass in 1970 and 1971. US 113 was relocated as a four-lane divided highway from its US 13 intersection to east of Pilchard Creek, over which a new bridge was built for the northbound carriageway, starting in 1972. The now-bypassed 1936 Pocomoke City bypass was redesignated MD 359 after the completion of the new bypass in late 1974. The two-lane Snow Hill bypass was built as the southbound carriageway of an eventual divided highway from its south end to MD 12 in 1971 and 1972 and from MD 12 to north of Snow Hill between 1973 and 1975; the latter section included a three-span bridge across Purnell Branch. The bypassed portion of US 113 through Snow Hill became MD 394 in 1976. MD 394 was redesignated US 113 Business after AASHTO approved the new designation at its spring 1997 meeting.

=== Divided highway continuation ===
Expansion of US 113 to a divided highway slowed in the 1970s. As with most major highway projects, the divided highway expansion projects received partial federal funding, and starting in 1970, those federally aided projects required environmental impact assessment under the National Environmental Policy Act. This new barrier slowed the completion of the divided highway between Milford to Dover. Maryland was subject to the same environmental assessment, but it was local activism that overcame state inaction in continuing divided highway construction along US 113 in that state.

==== Completion of divided highway in Delaware ====
The Negative Declaration for the expansion of US 113 from the north end of the Frederica bypass to US 113 Alternate at Little Heaven was issued in 1975, and construction began that same year. The Frederica–Little Heaven divided highway was completed in 1977. Design work for the divided highway from Little Heaven to Dover Air Force Base began as early as 1964, and considerable planning and design work was done before that work came to a halt in the 1970s. In addition to the environmental effects of the highway crossing a large marsh, which required DelDOT to produce a draft environmental impact statement, DelDOT needed to coordinate with the U.S. Coast Guard to construct a new bridge across the St. Jones River. US 113 was finally expanded to a divided highway, including a four-lane bridge across the St. Jones River, by 1985. The final stretch of two-lane US 113 in Delaware was eliminated when the second carriageway was added to the highway from North Bedford Street in Georgetown to north of Lincoln in 1995 and 1996. This expansion, in particular a section near Ellendale, was included in a Federal Highway Administration pavement study.

==== Berlin to Selbyville expansion and relocation ====
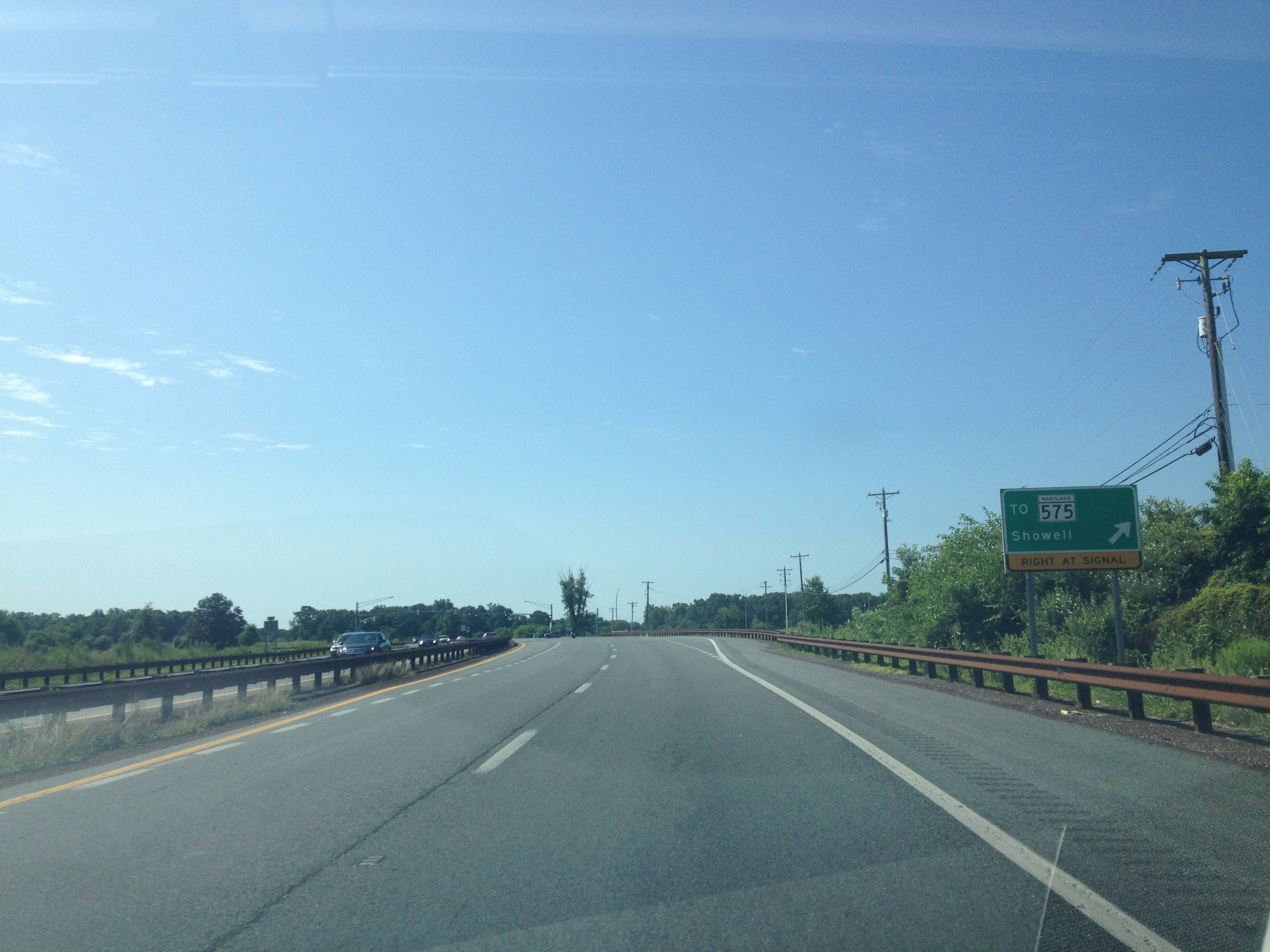
US 113 southbound approaching an intersection with Peerless Road that connects to MD 575, the former alignment of US 113 through Showell

MDSHA conducted its first study on expanding US 113 north of Berlin to a divided highway in the early 1970s. Although US 113 was not expanded at that time, preparations for a future expansion were started, including acquisition of right of way along the proposed route. When MD 90 was built from US 50 to east of US 113 between 1973 and 1976, its interchange with the future course of US 113 was partially constructed. MDSHA conducted a second planning study in the late 1980s; in 1990, the agency decided to implement intersection improvements instead of constructing a divided highway. One particular improvement was reconstructing the highway immediately to the south of the Delaware state line to better tie into the divided highway in Delaware in 1989 and 1990.

After the second study resulted in no further movement toward divided highway construction, locals formed the County Residents Action for Safer Highways (CRASH) in response to the significantly higher collision rates along the two-lane sections of US 113 compared to the state average. The high collision rate, which included 42 fatal crashes between 1980 and 1997, led CRASH to rally community support and intensely lobby MDSHA to expand US 113 to four lanes. MDSHA responded in 1995 by initiating the US 113 Planning Study, which recommended expanding US 113 to a divided highway from Berlin to the Delaware state line and from Snow Hill to Berlin. The agency needed to persuade other involved agencies to make the proposed expansion their top priority, because at the time traffic volumes on the highway did not meet the thresholds beyond which the highway would need to be expanded to a four-lane divided highway.

US 113 was reconstructed from Berlin to the Delaware state line in three sections starting in 1998. The first section was constructed on a new alignment from north of MD 818 to south of MD 589 to quell objections from residents of Friendship over the divided highway passing through their community. This segment, work on which included finishing the MD 90 interchange 24 years after it was partially constructed, was completed in 2000. The second segment of US 113 reconstruction, from south of MD 589 to Jarvis Road, included two relocations from the old highway to reduce impacts to St. Martin's Episcopal Church and the community of Showell. The second section, including the interchange with MD 589, was placed under construction in 2000 and was completed in 2002. The divided highway was completed to the Delaware state line after the second carriageway was added along the existing alignment north of Jarvis Road between 2001 and 2003. Sections of old alignment of US 113, service roads, and reconstructed connections with other highways were designated MD 575 starting in 2000. In November 2001, the National Partnership for Highway Quality awarded its Special Recognition of a Small Project Award to the Maryland Department of Transportation for the department's use of a modified design-bid-build contract approach to reduce the time needed to complete the first segment of the US 113 expansion north of Berlin.

=== Dover freeway, Milford truncation, and completion of Maryland divided highway ===
US 113's role between Milford and Dover became secondary with the designation and extension of DE 1 throughout the state in conjunction with the proposed US 13 Relief Route, which is now the Korean War Veterans Memorial Highway from Dover Air Force Base to Christiana. DE 1 was assigned to the Milford Bypass and concurrently with DE 14 along the coastal highway south from Milford to the Maryland state line at Fenwick Island in 1973. DE 1 was co-signed with DE 14 through the Delaware beach communities until 1976, when DE 14 was truncated at Milford. The DE 1 designation was extended north by 1988 along US 113 from Milford to Dover and continuing north along US 13 toward Christiana to connect sections of the Relief Route as they were completed. In 1991, DelDOT enacted corridor preservation measures on DE 1, including its concurrency with US 113, from Dover Air Force Base to Nassau to prevent excessive development along the corridor so it can gradually be transformed into a freeway.

==== Dover freeway upgrade and truncation ====
The southernmost part of the Korean War Veterans Memorial Highway, from south of DE 10 to north of Bay Road, was placed under construction in 1990 and opened along with the Dover–Smyrna portion of DE 1 in 1993. US 113 traffic needed to use a temporary tie-in during construction, and after the new freeway opened, traffic on the U.S. Highway needed to use Exit 95 to transfer between the new freeway and Bay Road. The extension of the DE 1 freeway south through Dover Air Force Base was constructed later due to the need to coordinate negotiations with the military installation and to allow the base to remediate hazardous material sites, maintain security and access restrictions with construction of a new Main Gate, and reconstruct base housing on the west side of the highway. The Main Gate to Dover Air Force base was moved further east, and a diamond interchange was built between the Main Gate and the base housing area. The upgrade of US 113 and DE 1 through the military base was built in two phases, the first from 1996 to 1998 and the second in 1999 and 2000.

The final piece of the Relief Route associated with US 113 was the Puncheon Run Connector, which would provide a direct connection between US 13 and DE 1 and US 113. The connector and its partial interchange with US 113 were built between 1998 and 2000. In 2003, the same year the last portion of the Relief Route was completed, DelDOT requested US 113 be eliminated from Milford to Dover in favor of the sole designation of DE 1 from Milford to Dover. AASHTO denied DelDOT's application at their spring 2003 meeting because the state did not address the status of US 113 Alternate. The organization approved DelDOT's application to also eliminate US 113 Alternate in addition to the Milford–Dover portion of US 113 at their annual meeting later in 2003. Bay Road became an unnumbered highway between Exit 95 at Dover Air Force Base and the old northern terminus of US 113 at US 13 in Dover.

==== Snow Hill to Berlin expansion ====
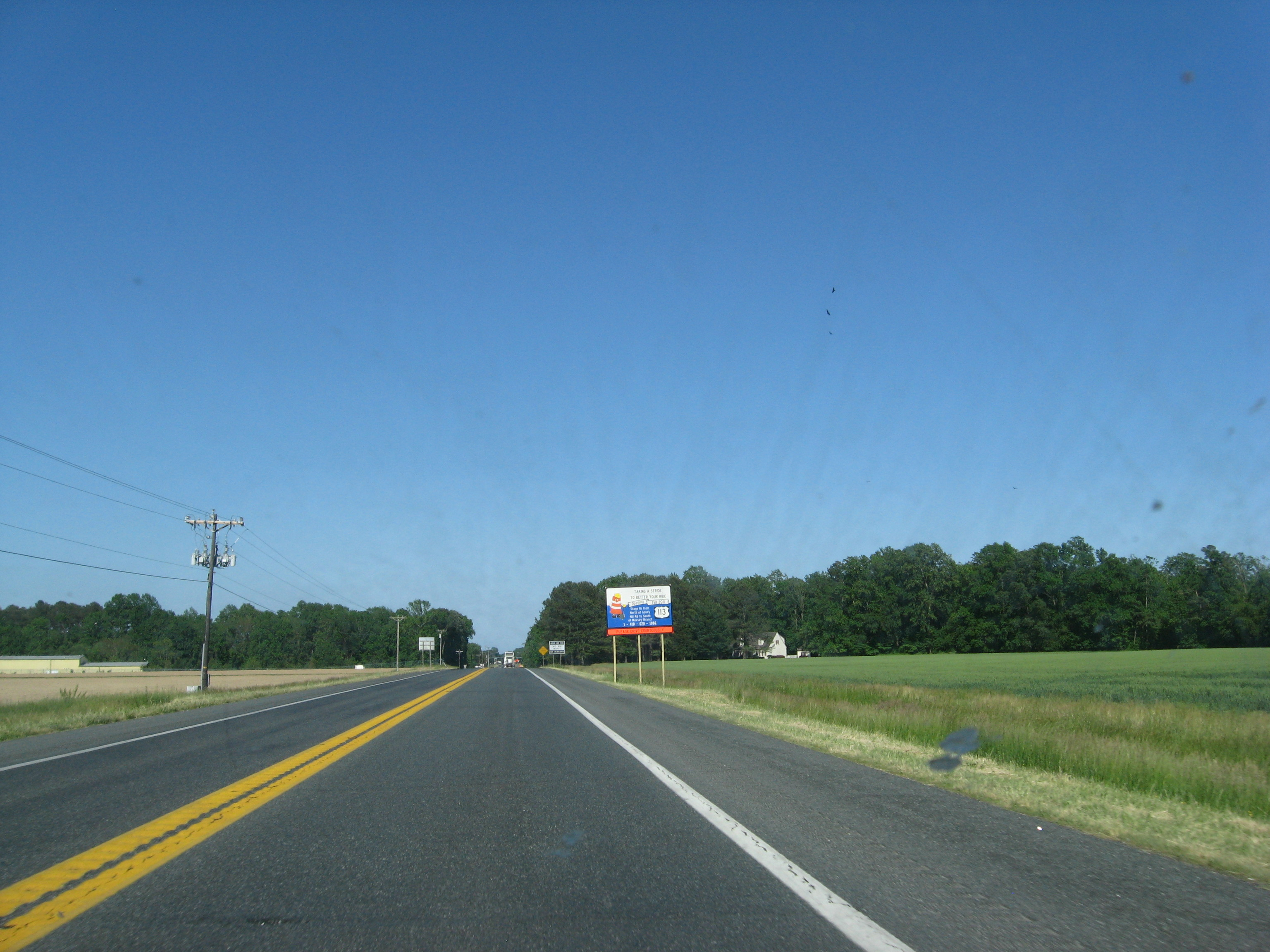
Northbound along the penultimate two-lane section of US 113 near Newark in 2010. This section has since been expanded to a four-lane divided highway.

Following the expansion of US 113 from Berlin to the Delaware state line, MDSHA turned its attention toward the remaining 17 miles (27 km) of two-lane highway in Maryland between the southern end of the Snow Hill Bypass and the southern end of the existing divided highway at Hayes Landing Road south of Berlin. In 2005, MDSHA began construction on a five-phase, long-term project to expand US 113 between Snow Hill and Berlin to a four-lane divided highway to improve safety and service in the face of increasing seasonal traffic and development. Phase 1, which covered 4.0 miles (6.4 km) of the Snow Hill bypass from the southern terminus of US 113 Business to just north of MD 365, was completed in 2007. In 2015, MDSHA replaced the standard intersection between US 113 and MD 365 with a superstreet intersection.

Phase 2 was divided into two sub-phases. Phase 2A, which covered the 2.5 miles (4.0 km) of US 113 from Goody Hill Road south of Ironshire to Hayes Landing Road, occurred from 2007 to 2009. Phase 2B, which covered the 1.8 miles (2.9 km) of highway between Massey Branch just north of Newark and Goody Hill Road, began in 2009 and was complete at the end of 2011. The service roads constructed during both parts of Phase 2 to restore access to properties cut off by the state establishing partial control of access on US 113 were designated segments of MD 921. Construction on Phase 3, which involved the 4.4 miles (7.1 km) of roadway between Five Mile Branch Road north of Snow Hill and Massey Branch, began in fall 2015. Phase 4 includes the 4.5-mile (7.2 km) section of US 113 between the northern end of Phase 1 near MD 365 north to the southern end of Phase 3 at Five Mile Branch Road north of Snow Hill. Construction on Phase 4 began in 2017. Construction on widening US 113 in Maryland to four lanes was finished in December 2019, which completed US 113 as a four-lane divided highway from Pocomoke City to Milford.

=== Future upgrades ===
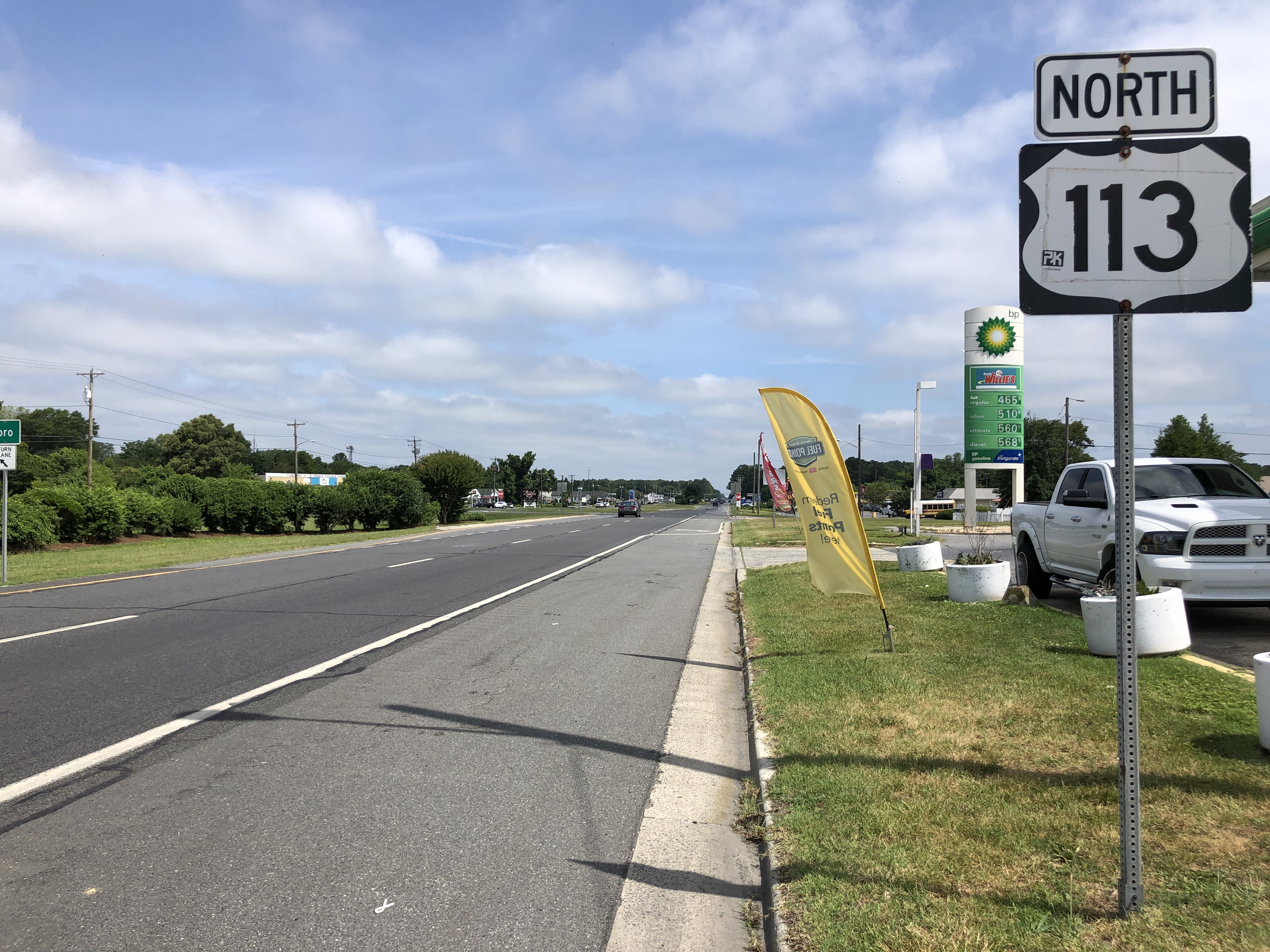
US 113 northbound in Selbyville

Maryland and Delaware plan to continue to upgrade US 113 to introduce freeway elements and access control to improve service on the U.S. Highway. MDSHA has a Phase 5 in its US 113 divided highway project for the construction of an interchange between US 113 and MD 12 in Snow Hill. As of 2007, the interchange was planned to be a dumbbell interchange, a variation on the diamond interchange with roundabouts replacing the two intersections of the ramps with the crossroad. The work would include adding service roads to improve access among US 113, MD 12, Washington Street, and Brick Kiln Road. As of April 2017, Phase 5 was stalled in the design stage with no estimated completion date. The state has long-term plans to establish partial control of access on US 113 between Pocomoke City and the south end of the Snow Hill bypass. Once that project is complete, the only remaining stretch of US 113 in Maryland without access controls will be from Hayes Landing Road to the south end of the Berlin bypass.

In 2001, the DelDOT conducted a feasibility study for a future north–south limited access highway in Sussex County. The Sussex County North–South Transportation Study explored routes along and between the US 13, US 113, and DE 1 corridors. The study took into account local, long distance, and seasonal traffic patterns; environmental, agricultural, and developmental impacts; connections with arterial highways; and the ability to build the limited-access highway in usable sections. The study recommended routing the limited-access highway along the US 113 corridor, using as much of the current US 113 route as possible. For its standing US 113 North/South Study, DelDOT has split the corridor into four areas: Millsboro–South, Georgetown, Ellendale, and Milford.

==== Ellendale and Georgetown planning complete ====
Improvements in the Ellendale and Georgetown areas have been environmentally cleared, which means design and engineering can proceed as funding becomes available. The Federal Highway Administration approved the Ellendale Area Environmental Assessment with a Finding of No Significant Impact in 2010. DelDOT plans to upgrade US 113 on its present alignment through the study area, which runs from south of Redden Road to north of DE 16. Along much of the route, service roads would be constructed parallel to the present highway to provide access to properties along US 113 and to connect with the local road system and reduce the number of contact points with US 113. Interchanges are planned at Redden Road and DE 16. The proposed interchange at DE 16 is in the design phase.

The Federal Highway Administration approved the Georgetown Area Environmental Assessment with a Finding of No Significant Impact in 2014. As with the Ellendale area, DelDOT plans to upgrade US 113 along its present alignment from south of Avenue of Honor north of Millsboro to south of Redden Road. Interchanges are planned near Piney Grove Road and Avenue of Honor north of Millsboro; at Governor Stockley Road at Stockley; near Speedway Road, Alms House Road, and Kruger Road north of Stockley; at Shortly Road and South Bedford Street on the southern edge of Georgetown; at Arrow Safety Road in Georgetown; at US 9 in Georgetown; at DE 18/DE 404 in Georgetown; and at Wilson Road north of Georgetown. The U.S. Highway's intersection with DE 18/DE 404 has the highest crash rate and the highest level of traffic congestion in the study area, so that intersection will be replaced with an interchange first. US 113 will be expanded to six lanes throughout the corridor, and right-in/right-out access to adjoining businesses would be maintained, with efforts to reduce the number of contact points. The interchange at DE 18/DE 404 is currently in the design phase, with construction expected to begin in 2024.

==== Millsboro–South plan reduction and Milford suspension ====
Unlike in Ellendale and Georgetown, the Millsboro–South and Milford proposals faced strong opposition. In the Millsboro–South area, DelDOT's preferred alternative, the Blue Alternative, was an eastern bypass that would diverge from existing US 113 north of Selbyville; pass to the east of Frankford and Dagsboro, cross the Indian River, and parallel DE 24 west to rejoin US 113's present course north of Betts Pond north of Millsboro. US 113 would have had interchanges with DE 54 at its current junction, with DE 20 and DE 26 east of Dagsboro, with DE 24 east of Millsboro, with DE 30 north of Millsboro, and with DE 20 where the bypass rejoins the present course of US 113. However, DelDOT's preference faced opposition due to its cost, its land requirements, and a revelation that DelDOT was paying a pair of developers each month to not build on the path of the proposed bypass. In response to the payment scheme, Governor Jack Markell suspended further planning work on US 113 in Sussex County in January 2011. Markell indicated the project could resume if Sussex County legislators and DelDOT come up with a revised plan for the Millsboro–South area.

In May 2011, Sussex County legislators proposed the U.S. Highway be upgraded fully along its current alignment, with the addition of a northeast bypass of Millsboro to connect US 113 and DE 24 that could be constructed mostly through state-owned land. Despite opposition to its preferred alternative, DelDOT completed the Draft Environmental Impact Statement for the Millsboro–South area in July 2013; the document recognized the significant opposition to the Blue Alternative. In 2015, DelDOT announced that the Blue Alternative was no longer being considered. Instead, US 113 would be upgraded along its current alignment as part of a Modified Yellow Alternative. However, unlike the original Yellow Alternative, which would upgrade US 113 to a freeway and featured several interchanges, US 113 would not become a freeway under the modified plan. Instead, only some crossroads would be eliminated, US 113 would be expanded to six lanes between its intersections with DE 20 on either side of Millsboro, and a two-lane northeast bypass of Millsboro proposed in 2011 would be built and connect with US 113 at a partial cloverleaf interchange near the northern US 113–DE 20 junction. In December 2016, DelDOT completed a Supplemental Draft Environmental Impact Statement in which the Modified Yellow Alternative is the agency's preferred alternative.. In 2025, the North Millsboro Bypass opened. As part of the project, the intersection between DE 20 and Betts Pond road was removed and replaced with an interchange with DE 20 and the North Millsboro Bypass, with Betts Pond Road accessible via a connector road from the North Millsboro Bypass. DE 24 was also realigned onto the North Millsboro Bypass, running concurrent with US 113 between the new interchange and Laurel Road, with Washington Street realined as DE 24 Business.

The Milford area study has been dormant since July 2007 due to community opposition to DelDOT's proposed alternatives through Lincoln and Milford. After studying various options that included upgrading the current alignment and constructing bypass routes to the west and east of Milford, DelDOT decided to move forward with a pair of eastern bypass alternatives in June 2007. Both alternatives head east from US 113's current alignment southwest of Lincoln, bypass the village to the south and east, have an interchange with DE 30 and Johnson Road, and meet DE 1 at an interchange south of the latter highway's interchange with the south end of DE 1 Business. On June 15, 2007, DelDOT announced it would move forward with plans to build the bypass despite the majority of the department's advisory group of community representatives opposing the bypass, far below the required 75 percent for consensus to have been achieved. On July 1, 2007, in response to DelDOT overriding its advisory group, the Delaware General Assembly passed Senate Bill 155, which prohibited DelDOT from proceeding with the US 113 North/South Improvements Project in the Milford and Lincoln areas and directed DelDOT to continue to work to achieve consensus on an acceptable bypass route. Citing a lack of community consensus, DelDOT abandoned its plans for the US 113 bypass of Milford in January 2008.

== Junction list ==
State	County	Location	mi	km	Destinations	Notes
Maryland	Worcester	Pocomoke City	0.00	0.00	US 13 (Ocean Highway) / MD 250A south (Old Virginia Road) – Norfolk, Salisbury, Princess Anne, UMES	Southern terminus of US 113; MD 250A is unsigned
Maryland	Worcester	Pocomoke City	0.25	0.40	American Legion Drive to MD 359 (Bypass Road)	American Legion Drive is unsigned MD 359B
Maryland	Worcester	Pocomoke City	1.27	2.04	MD 756 south (Old Snow Hill Road) – Pocomoke	Northern terminus of MD 756
Maryland	Worcester	Snow Hill	9.60	15.45	US 113 Bus. north (Market Street) – Snow Hill	Southern terminus of US 113 Bus.
Maryland	Worcester	Snow Hill	11.82	19.02	MD 12 (Snow Hill Road) – Snow Hill, Girdletree, Stockton	
Maryland	Worcester	Snow Hill	13.01	20.94	MD 365 (Public Landing Road) – County Facilities, Public Landing	Superstreet intersection
Maryland	Worcester	Snow Hill	14.12	22.72	US 113 Bus. south (Market Street) – Snow Hill Town Center	Northern terminus of US 113 Bus.
Maryland	Worcester	Berlin	27.24	43.84	MD 818 north (Main Street) – Berlin Town Center	Southern terminus of MD 818
Maryland	Worcester	Berlin	28.08	45.19	MD 376 (Bay Street) – Berlin, Assateague Island Parks	
Maryland	Worcester	Berlin	28.88	46.48	MD 346 (Old Ocean City Boulevard) – Berlin Town Center	
Maryland	Worcester	Berlin	29.41	47.33	US 50 (Ocean Gateway) – Salisbury, Ocean City	Cloverleaf interchange
Maryland	Worcester	Berlin	29.84	48.02	MD 818 south (Main Street)	Northern terminus of MD 818
Maryland	Worcester	Friendship	30.47	49.04	MD 575 north (Worcester Highway)	Right-in/right-out interchange northbound; southern terminus of MD 575
Maryland	Worcester	Friendship	31.88	51.31	MD 90 (Ocean City Expressway) – Salisbury, Ocean City	Partial cloverleaf interchange
Maryland	Worcester	Showell	32.86	52.88	MD 589 (Racetrack Road) / MD 575 (Worcester Highway) – Ocean Pines	Diamond interchange; northern terminus of MD 589 and MD 575
Maryland	Worcester	Showell	33.38	53.72	MD 575 north (Old US 113) – Showell	Right-in/right-out interchange southbound; officially MD 575B
Maryland	Worcester	Showell	33.98	54.69	Shingle Landing Road / Peerless Road to MD 575 (Old US 113) – Showell	Shingle Landing Road is unsigned MD 575C; Peerless Road is unsigned MD 575D
Maryland	Worcester	Bishop	35.68	57.42	MD 367 (Bishopville Road) – Bishopville	
Maryland	Worcester	Bishop	36.61	58.92	MD 610 south (Whaleyville Road) / Hammond Road east – Whaleyville, Salisbury	Northern terminus of MD 610; Hammond Road is unsigned MD 575L
			37.49 0.00	60.33 0.00	Maryland–Delaware state line	
Delaware	Sussex	Selbyville	0.84	1.35	DE 54 (Cemetery Road/Cypress Road) – Gumboro, Selbyville, Fenwick Island	
Delaware	Sussex	Dagsboro	6.58	10.59	DE 26 (Nine Foot Road/Clayton Street) – Gumboro, Laurel, Dagsboro, Ocean View, Bethany Beach	
Delaware	Sussex	Millsboro	8.58	13.81	DE 20 east (Dagsboro Road) – Bethany Beach	South end of concurrency with DE 20
Delaware	Sussex	Millsboro	10.17	16.37	DE 24 west (Laurel Road/Washington Street) / DE 24 Bus. – Laurel, Gumboro, Millsboro, Rehoboth Beach, Oak Orchard	South end of concurrency with DE 24
Delaware	Sussex	Millsboro	11.70	18.83	DE 20 west (Hardscrabble Road) / DE 24 east – Seaford, Laurel	Partial cloverleaf interchange; North end of concurrency with DE 20 and DE 24
Delaware	Sussex	Stockley			DE 24 Alt. east (Speedway Road)	Western terminus of DE 24 Alt.
Delaware	Sussex	Georgetown			US 9 Truck east / DE 404 Truck east (Arrow Safety Road)	South end of concurrency with US 9 Truck/DE 404 Truck
Delaware	Sussex	Georgetown	18.83	30.30	US 9 (County Seat Highway/West Market Street) – Laurel, Seaford, Georgetown, Lewes	North end of concurrency with US 9 Truck
Delaware	Sussex	Georgetown	19.99	32.17	DE 18 / DE 404 (Seashore Highway/Bridgeville Road) – Bridgeville, Bay Bridge, Georgetown, Lewes, Rehoboth Beach	North end of concurrency with DE 404 Truck
Delaware	Sussex	Ellendale	27.96	45.00	DE 16 (Beach Highway/Milton Ellendale Highway) – Greenwood, Ellendale, Milton	
Delaware	Sussex	Milford	34.53	55.57	DE 36 (Shawnee Road/Lakeview Avenue) – Greenwood, Seaford, Milford, Cedar Beach	
Delaware	Kent	Milford	35.54	57.20	DE 14 (Milford Harrington Highway/Northwest Front Street) – Harrington, Milford	
Delaware	Kent	Milford	36.93	59.43	DE 1 Bus. south (North Walnut Street)	South end of concurrency with DE 1 Bus.
Delaware	Kent	Milford	37.26	59.96	DE 1 north (Bay Road) – Dover, Wilmington	Northern terminus of US 113 and DE 1 Bus.; northbound exit to northbound DE 1 and southbound entrance from southbound DE 1
1.000 mi = 1.609 km; 1.000 km = 0.621 mi: Concurrency terminus; Incomplete access

== Special routes ==
US 113 has had two special routes: an existing business route through Snow Hill and a former alternate route between Little Heaven and Dover.

=== Snow Hill business route ===
U.S. Route 113 Business
- Location: Snow Hill, Maryland
- Length: 4.16 mi (6.69 km)
- Existed: 1997–present
- Tourist routes: Cape to Cape Scenic Byway

U.S. Route 113 Business (US 113 Business) is a business route of US 113 in Maryland. The route follows Market Street for 4.16 miles (6.69 km) between junctions with US 113 on the south and north sides of Snow Hill. The business route is part of the Cape to Cape Scenic Byway from its southern intersection with MD 12 to US 113 north of Snow Hill. US 113 Business follows the original course of US 113 through Snow Hill. The portions of the highway outside Snow Hill were paved by 1912, and the town portion was resurfaced and became a state highway by 1923. The Snow Hill bypass was completed in 1975, and the bypassed portion of US 113 through the town became Maryland Route 394 in 1976. MD 394 was redesignated US 113 Business after AASHTO approved the new designation at its spring 1997 meeting.

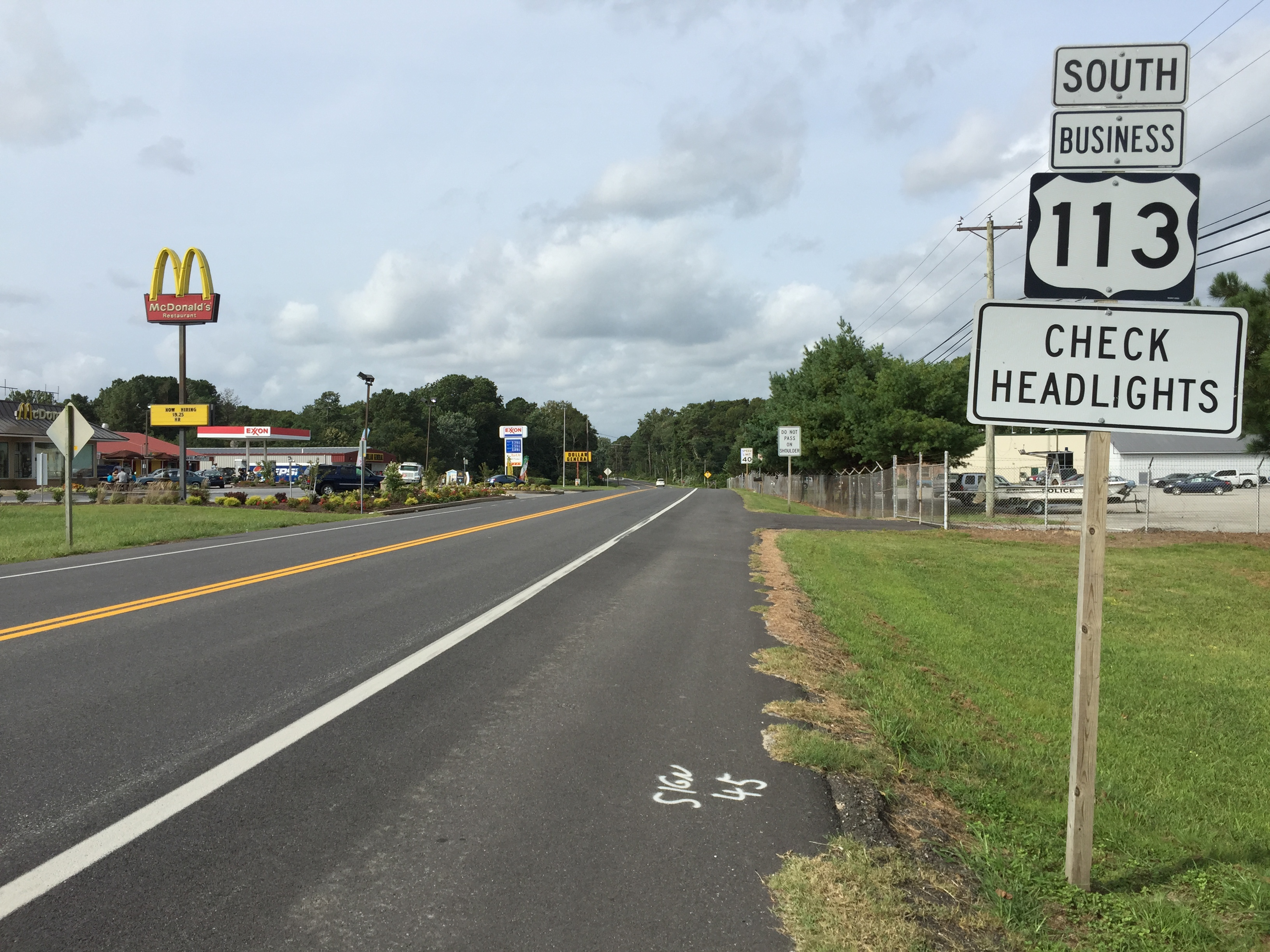
View south at the north end of US 113 Bus. at US 113 in Snow Hill

US 113 Business begins at an intersection with US 113 (Worcester Highway) south of Snow Hill. The business route heads northeast as two-lane undivided Market Street into the town limits and to the downtown area. US 113 Business passes near the neoclassical home Chanceford and by the Julia A. Purnell Museum, which displays the history and memorability of Snow Hill, including the namesake's needlework. The route passes the Georgian-style Samuel Gunn House and All Hallows Episcopal Church, an example of 18th-century church vernacular architecture, on either side of its junction with MD 12 (Church Street). MD 12 joins US 113 Business for a short concurrency through downtown Snow Hill, during which the two highways pass the Worcester County Courthouse and Makemie Memorial Presbyterian Church, an Isaac Pursell–designed High Victorian Gothic church honoring Francis Makemie, the founder of Presbyterianism in the United States. After MD 12 turns north onto Washington Street, the business route passes the Gothic Revival–style George Washington Purnell House and meets the west end of MD 365 (Bay Street) at the east end of downtown Snow Hill. US 113 Business crosses Purnell Branch, a tributary of the Pocomoke River, and leaves the town limits of Snow Hill just west of its northern terminus at US 113.

Junction list
The entire route is in Snow Hill, Worcester County.

mi	km	Destinations	Notes
0.00	0.00	US 113 (Worcester Highway) – Pocomoke City	Southern terminus of US 113 Bus.
2.67	4.30	MD 12 south (Church Street) – Girdletree, Stockton	South end of concurrency with MD 12
2.85	4.59	MD 12 north (Washington Street) – Salisbury	North end of concurrency with MD 12
3.02	4.86	MD 365 east (Bay Street) – Public Landing	Western terminus of MD 365
4.16	6.69	US 113 (Worcester Highway) – Berlin	Northern terminus of US 113 Bus.
1.000 mi = 1.609 km; 1.000 km = 0.621 mi: Concurrency terminus

=== Former Little Heaven–Dover alternate route ===
U.S. Route 113 Alternate
- Location: Little Heaven–Dover, Delaware
- Length: 9.10 mi (14.65 km)
- Existed: 1936–2003

U.S. Route 113 Alternate (US 113 Alternate) was an alternate route of US 113 that extended 9.10 miles (14.65 km) from US 113 and DE 1 in Little Heaven north to the intersection of US 13 and US 113 in Dover. US 113 Alternate followed the original path of the DuPont Highway between Little Heaven and US 13 in Dover. The DuPont Highway was paved through Rising Sun by 1920, and the entire length of the Selbyville–Wilmington highway was complete by 1923. When the U.S. Highway System was finalized in 1926, US 113's northern terminus was at Coopers Corner south of Dover, and US 13 followed State Street through the state capital. US 113 was extended north along State Street to the junction of State Street and Governors Avenue on the south side of Silver Lake after US 13 was placed on a reconstructed Governors Avenue in 1930. After US 113's bypass of Dover was completed in 1935, US 113 Alternate was established along US 113's former course from Little Heaven to Dover and along State Street and joined US 13 to cross Silver Lake to reach US 113's northern terminus at the intersection of DuPont Highway and State Street.

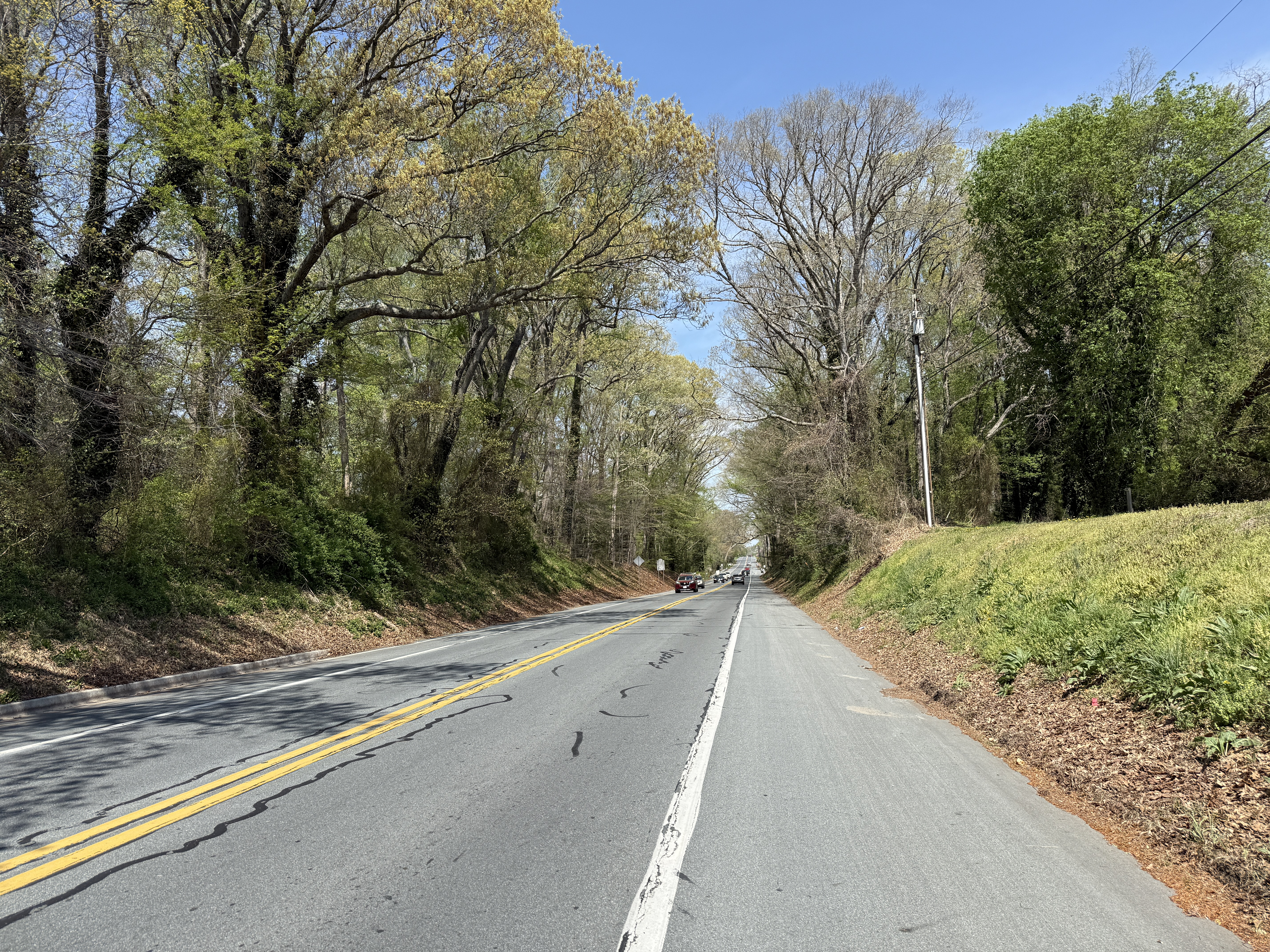
South State Street (former US 113 Alternate) northbound in Rising Sun

The year after US 113 Alternate was assigned, State Street through Dover was reconstructed and widened and construction began on a new bridge for US 13 and US 113 Alternate across Silver Lake. The hazardous, narrow causeway was replaced with a four-lane, brick-lined, reinforced concrete triple-arch bridge, and State Street between the bridge and the beginning of the US 13 divided highway at US 113's northern terminus was widened to four lanes, in 1937. The intersection of US 113 and US 113 Alternate at Little Heaven was reconstructed as a directional intersection in 1956. After US 13's bypass of Dover was completed in 1952, the northern termini of US 113 and US 113 Alternate remained north of Dover until 1974, when AASHTO approved moving the northern terminus of US 113 to the junction of US 13 and Bay Road. The organization also approved removing US 113 Alternate from State Street north of US 13 and instead following US 13 to US 113's northern terminus. US 113 Alternate was removed as an alternate route in conjunction with the elimination of US 113 between Milford and Dover after AASHTO approved the moves at the organization's 2003 annual meeting. The portions of US 113 Alternate that were not concurrent with US 13 or DE 10 Alternate became unnumbered.

US 113 Alternate began at an intersection with US 113 and DE 1 (Bay Road) in Little Heaven. Connections from southbound US 113 Alternate to northbound US 113 and DE 1 and from southbound US 113 and DE 1 to northbound US 113 Alternate were provided by Mulberrie Point Road. The highway headed northwest as two-lane undivided Clapham Road to the town of Magnolia, where the highway followed Main Street. There, US 113 Alternate intersected Walnut Street and passed by the late 18th-century Matthew Lowber House and the Queen Anne–style John B. Lindale House. The highway left Magnolia upon crossing Beaver Gut Ditch and continued northwest as South State Street, crossing Cypress Branch. The route came to the unincorporated village of Rising Sun, where it veered north and intersected DE 10 Alternate (Sorghum Mill Road). DE 10 Alternate joined US 113 Alternate in a concurrency north across Tidbury Creek to DE 10 Alternate's eastern terminus at their junction with DE 10 (Lebanon Road) in Highland Acres.

US 113 Alternate continued north across Isaac Branch at Moores Lake and passed through Kent Acres before it entered the city of Dover just south of its underpass of the Puncheon Run Connector freeway and crossing of Puncheon Run. Just north of the stream and highway, the alternate route intersected US 13 (DuPont Highway). While South State Street continued north toward the Dover Green Historic District and Delaware Legislative Hall, US 113 Alternate turned northeast to run concurrently with US 13. The two highways crossed the St. Jones River and intersected Court Street (named Martin Luther King Jr. Boulevard since 2013), which headed west toward the state capitol and east to provide access to US 113 (Bay Road). Immediately to the north of Court Street, US 113 Alternate and US 113 reached their joint termini at US 13's directional intersection with Bay Road; US 13 continued north along DuPont Highway. There was no direct access between US 113 Alternate and US 113 at the terminal intersection.

Junction list
The entire route was in Kent County.

Location	mi	km	Destinations	Notes
Little Heaven	0.00	0.00	US 113 south / DE 1 south (Bay Road) – Frederica, Milford	Former southern terminus of US 113 Alt.; former routing of US 113; no direct access from US 113 Alt. to northbound US 113 / DE 1 or from southbound US 113 / DE 1 to US 113 Alt.
Rising Sun	4.82	7.76	DE 10 Alt. west (Sorghum Mill Road) – Rising Sun, Woodside	South end of concurrency with DE 10 Alt.
Highland Acres	5.95	9.58	DE 10 (Lebanon Road) – Camden, Dover AFB DE 10 Alt. west	North end of concurrency with DE 10 Alt.; eastern terminus of DE 10 Alt.
Dover	7.51	12.09	US 13 south (South Dupont Highway) / South State Street north – Camden, Dover	South end of concurrency with US 13
Dover	8.91	14.34	Court Street to US 113 (Bay Road) – Dover AFB, Milford	US 113 formerly followed Bay Road; Court Street now named Martin Luther King Jr. Boulevard
Dover	9.10	14.65	US 13 north (South Dupont Highway) – Wilmington	Former northern termini of US 113 Alt. and US 113 at intersection of US 13 and Bay Road; no direct access between US 113 Alt. and US 113
1.000 mi = 1.609 km; 1.000 km = 0.621 mi: Concurrency terminus; Incomplete access

== Work cited ==
- John Milner Associates, Inc. (July 2005). Historic Context for the DuPont Highway U.S. Route 113: Kent and Sussex County, Delaware (PDF). in association with Whitman, Requardt, Inc. and Rummel, Klepper & Kahl, LLP. Dover, DE: Delaware Department of Transportation.
