= Silver Lake (Dover, Delaware) =

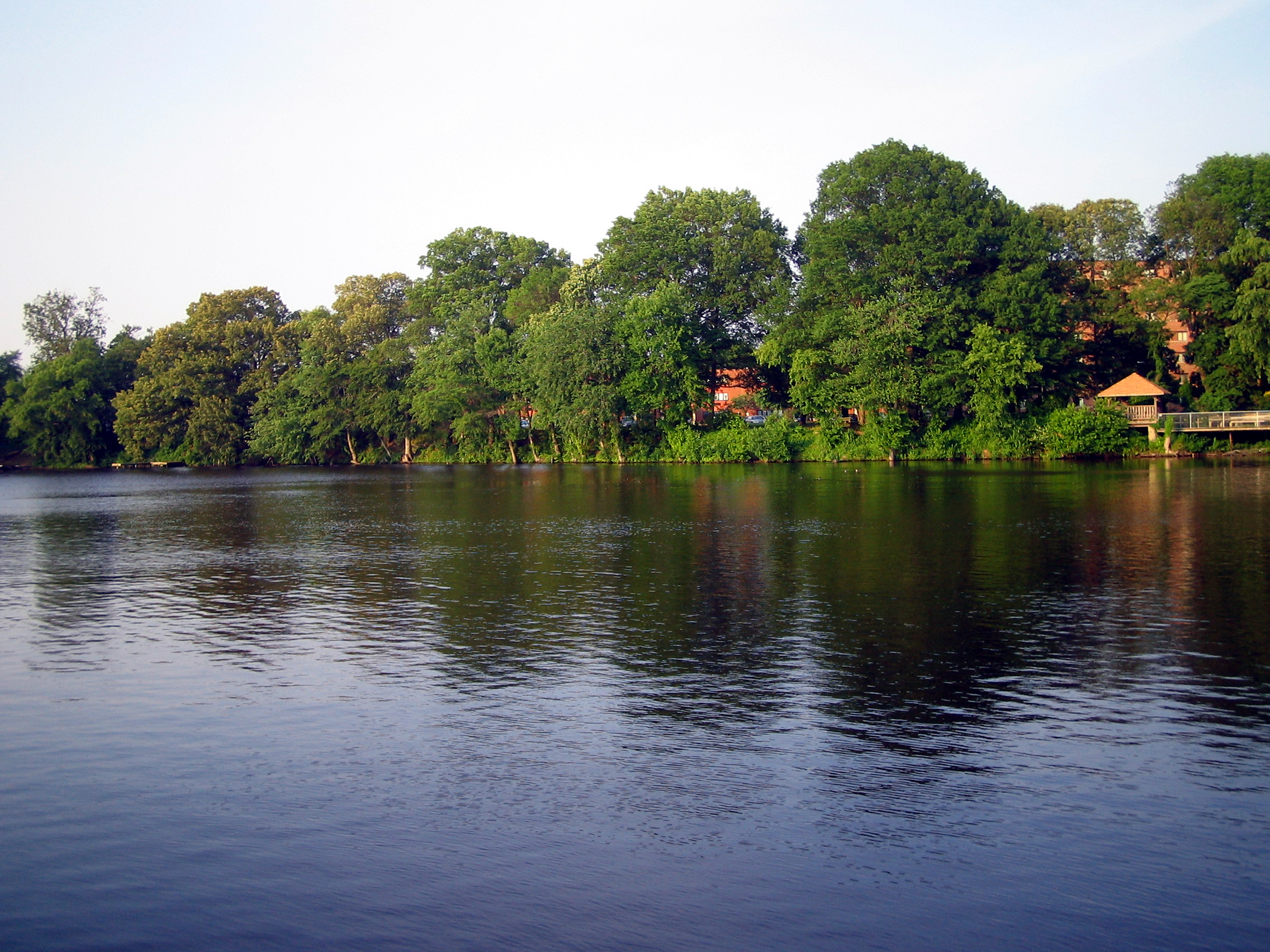
- Silver Lake in 2008

- Location within Delaware Location within the United States
- Location: Dover, Delaware
- Coordinates: 39°10′35″N 75°31′58″W
- Type: Reservoir
- Surface elevation: 13 feet (4.0 m)

Silver Lake is a lake and park located in the city of Dover, Delaware. The lake is the source of the St. Jones River. There are several species of fish in the lake, including largemouth bass, carp, crappie, striped bass, white perch, bluegill, catfish, and others. Silver Lake has a boat ramp. A permit is required by the City of Dover Parks and Recreation Department in order to fish at the lake. Boats also must display a permit regardless of the size of the craft.

The public area bordering Silver Lake has covered picnic tables, a walking path, children's play area with equipment, and grills for barbecue. This area is carry in/carry out but there are refuse containers on the property. Portable toilets are also provided. Access to parking is from Washington Street for the beach area and Lewis Mill Drive for boaters. Parking is ample.
