= Puncheon Run =

Puncheon Run Tributary to St. Jones River
- Location within Delaware Location within the United States

Location
- Country: United States
- State: Delaware
- County: Kent
- City: Dover

Physical characteristics
- Source: Cahoon Branch divide
  - location: about 1 mile southwest of Dover, Delaware
  - coordinates: 39°08′26″N 075°33′58″W
  - elevation: 44 ft (13 m)
- Mouth: St. Jones River
  - location: Dover, Delaware
  - coordinates: 39°08′23″N 075°30′40″W
  - elevation: 0 ft (0 m)
- Length: 3.27 mi (5.26 km)
- Basin size: 4.02 square miles (10.4 km^{2})
- Discharge
  - average: 4.86 cu ft/s (0.138 m^{3}/s) at mouth with Puncheon Run

Basin features
- Progression: St. Jones River → Delaware Bay → Atlantic Ocean
- River system: St. Jones River
- Tributaries
  - left: unnamed tributaries
  - right: unnamed tributaries
- Bridges: Wyoming Mill Road, New Burton Road, US 13, Puncheon Run Connector, South State Street

Puncheon Run is a 3.27 mi (5.26 km) long 2nd order tributary to the St. Jones River in Kent County, Delaware.

== Variant names ==
According to the Geographic Names Information System, it has also been known historically as:

- Puncheon Branch
- Walkers Branch

== Course ==
Puncheon Run rises on the Cahoon Branch divide about 1 mile southwest of Dover, Delaware.

== Watershed ==
Puncheon Run drains 4.02 square miles (10.4 km^{2}) of area, receives about 44.8 in/year of precipitation, has a topographic wetness index of 627.80 and is about 4.3% forested.

== See also ==
- List of rivers of Delaware

== Maps ==
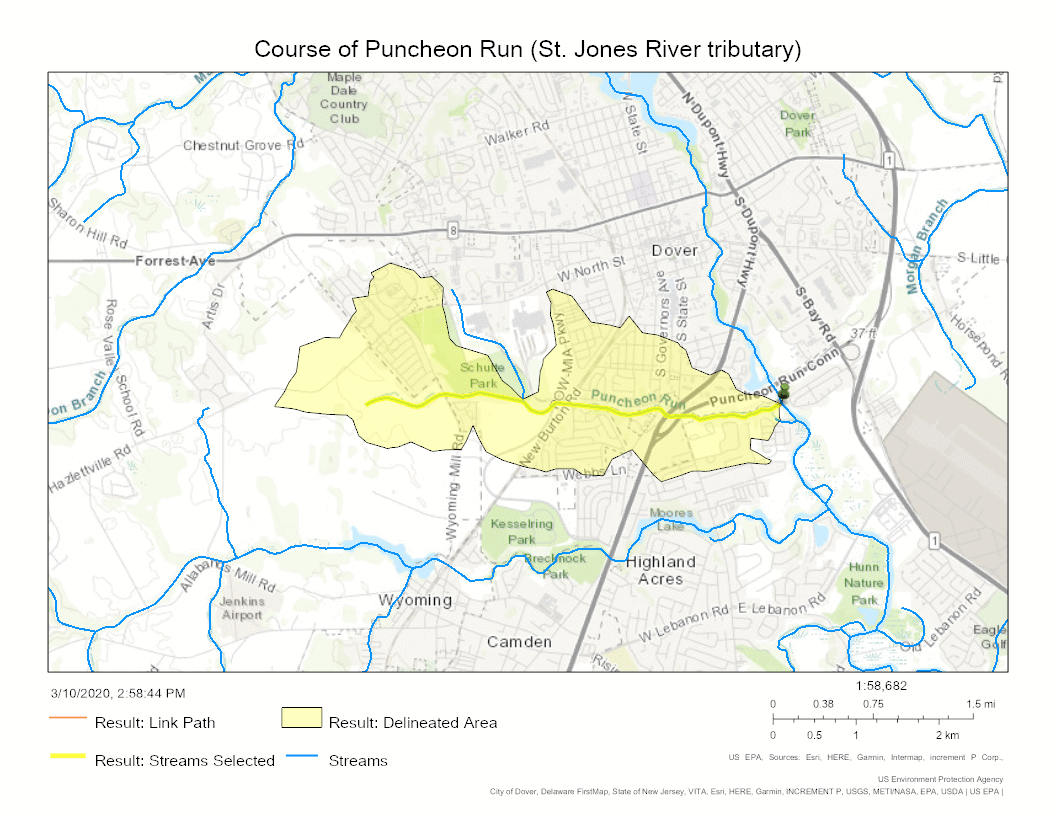
Course of Puncheon Run (St. Jones River tributary)

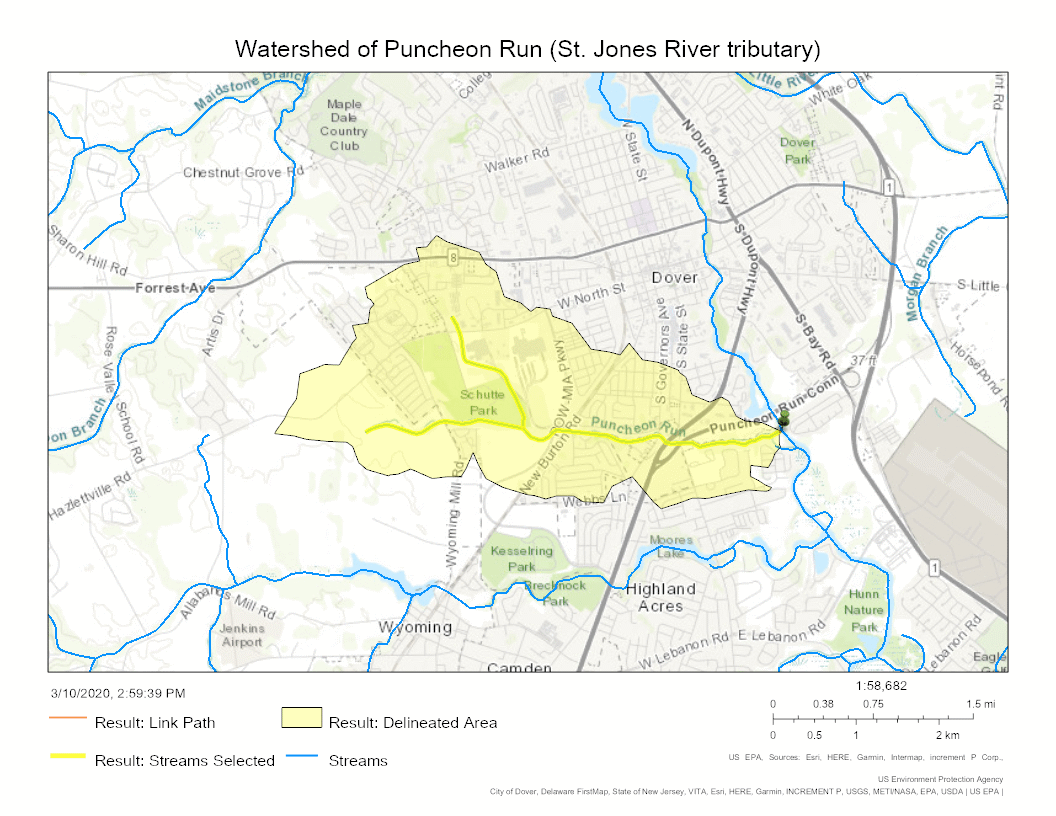
Watershed of Puncheon Run (St. Jones River tributary)
