= Cypress Branch (St. Jones River tributary) =

Stream in Delaware, USA

Cypress Branch Tributary to St. Jones River
- Location of Cypress Branch mouth Cypress Branch (St. Jones River tributary) (the United States)

Location
- Country: United States
- State: Delaware
- County: Kent

Physical characteristics
- Source: Tidbury Creek divide
  - location: Whispering Pines, Delaware
  - coordinates: 39°09′20″N 075°30′44″W
  - elevation: 25 ft (7.6 m)
- Mouth: St. Jones River
  - location: about 1 mile south of Dover, Delaware
  - coordinates: 39°06′05″N 075°28′16″W
  - elevation: 0 ft (0 m)
- Length: 2.81 mi (4.52 km)
- Basin size: 2.91 square miles (7.5 km^{2})
- Discharge
  - location: St. Jones River
  - average: 3.49 cu ft/s (0.099 m^{3}/s) at mouth with St. Jones River

Basin features
- Progression: St. Jones River → Delaware Bay → Atlantic Ocean
- River system: St. Jones River
- Tributaries
  - left: unnamed tributaries
  - right: unnamed tributaries
- Bridges: South State Street, Cypress Branch Road

Cypress Branch is a 2.81 mi (4.52 km) long 1st order tributary to St. Jones River in Kent County, Delaware.

== Course ==
Cypress Branch rises at Whispering Pines in Kent County, Delaware on the Tidbury Creek divide. Cypress Branch then flows northeasterly to meet the St. Jones River about 1 mile south of Dover, Delaware.

== Watershed ==
Newell Branch drains 1.63 square miles (4.2 km^{2}) of area, receives about 44.8 in/year of precipitation, has a topographic wetness index of 604.28 and is about 1.2% forested.

== See also ==
- List of Delaware rivers

== Maps ==
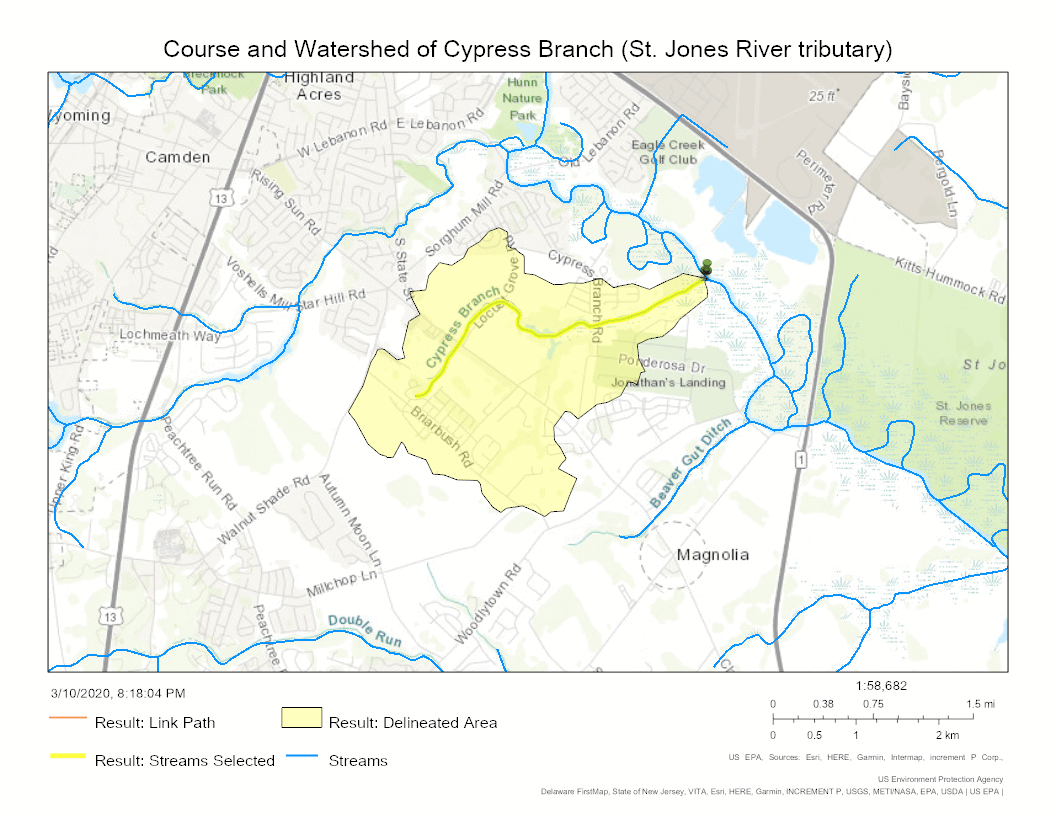
Course and Watershed of Cypress Branch (St. Jones River tributary)
