= St. Jones River =

St. Jones River Tributary to Delaware Bay
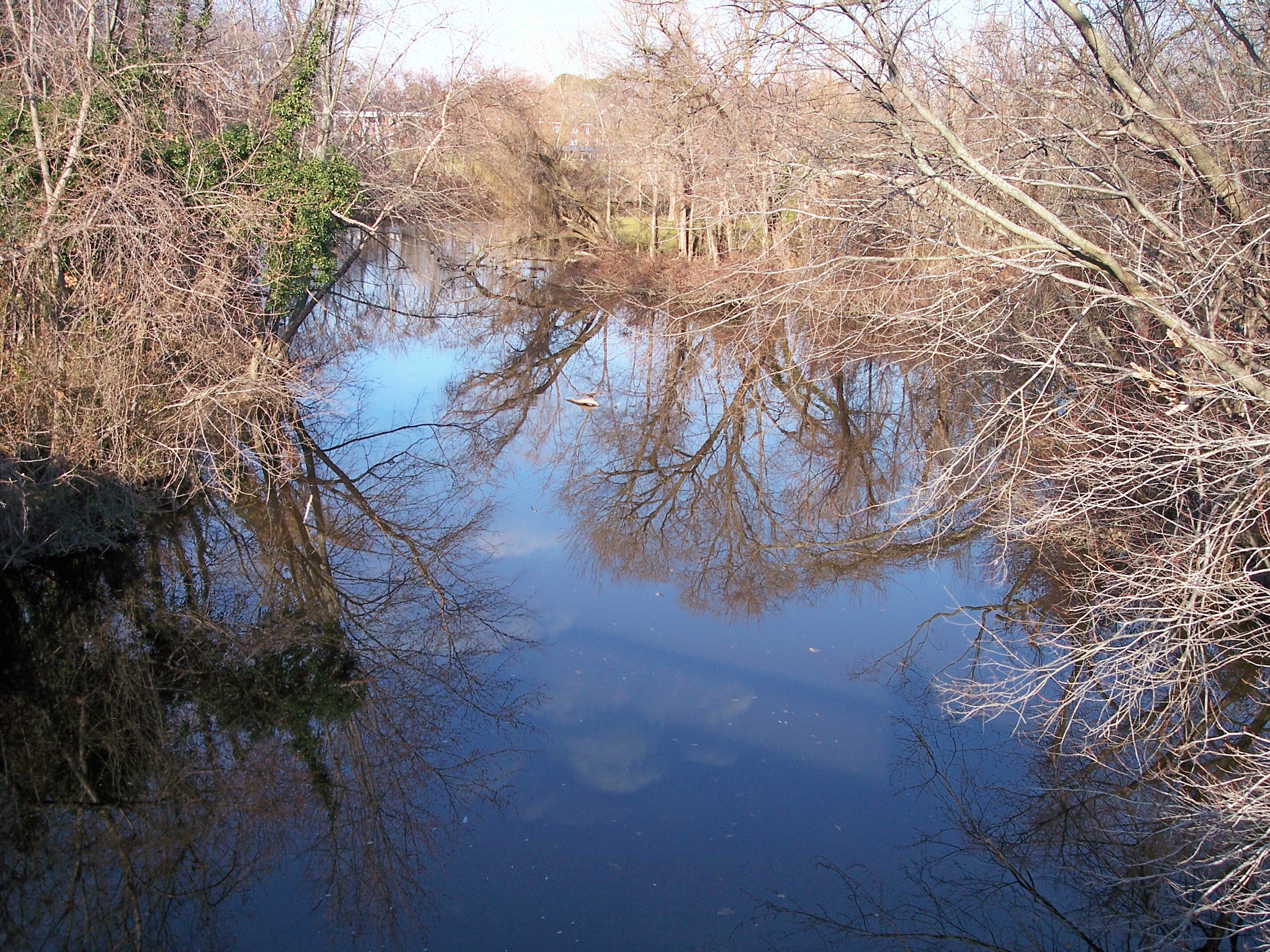
- The St. Jones River in Dover in 2006

- Location of the mouth of the St. Jones River

Location
- Country: United States
- State: Delaware
- County: Kent
- City: Dover

Physical characteristics
- Source: Silver Lake
  - location: Dover
  - coordinates: 39°10′06″N 75°31′18″W
  - elevation: 13 ft (4.0 m)
- Mouth: Delaware Bay
  - location: Bowers
  - coordinates: 39°03′57″N 75°24′03″W
  - elevation: 0 ft (0 m)
- Length: 13 mi (21 km)
- Basin size: 36 sq mi (93 km^{2})
- Discharge
  - location: Bowers Beach, Delaware
  - average: 107.65 cu ft/s (3.048 m^{3}/s) at mouth with Delaware Bay

Basin features
- Progression: Delaware Bay → Atlantic Ocean
- River system: Delaware Bay
- Tributaries
  - left: Fork Branch
  - right: Puncheon Run; Isaac Branch; Tidbury Creek; Cypress Branch; Beaver Gut Ditch; Trunk Ditch
- Waterbodies: Silver Lake
- Bridges: E Division Street, E Lookerman Street, Martin Luther King, jr. Blvd., US 13, Puncheon Run Connector, E Lebanon Road, DE 1

The St. Jones River is a river flowing to Delaware Bay in central Delaware in the United States. It is 12.8 miles (20.6 km) long and drains an area of 36 square miles (93 km^{2}) on the Atlantic Coastal Plain.

== History ==
The river is believed to have been named either for Robert Jones, an early European property owner in the region, or for "St. Jone", adapted from a Welsh spelling from St. John (Ioan).

== Course ==
The St. Jones River flows for its entire length in east-central Kent County. According to the Geographic Names Information System, the river begins at the dam of Silver Lake in the city of Dover; Silver Lake is fed by Fork Branch, Penrose Branch, and Maidstone Branch. From Silver Lake, the St. Jones River flows generally southeastwardly, along the east side of downtown Dover and past Legislative Hall, the Capital Square/Legislative Mall, and the Dover Air Force Base to Bowers, where it flows into Delaware Bay, approximately 0.5 miles (0.8 km) north of the mouth of the Murderkill River.

== Watershed ==
The lower course of the river southeast of Dover is surrounded by brackish marshes and salt marshes, open water habitats, and wetlands. A portion of the lower river, along with nearby Blackbird Creek, have received federal protection as the Delaware National Estuarine Research Reserve, part of the National Estuarine Research Reserve system.

== Variant names ==
The United States Board on Geographic Names settled on "St. Jones River" as the stream's name in 1894. According to the Geographic Names Information System, it has also been known historically as:

- Jones Creek
- Joness Creek
- Kishlen
- Saint Jones Creek
- Warge Kijhlen
- Wulfs Creek
- Wulfscreek

== See also ==
- List of Delaware rivers
