= April 13 =

April 13 this year in various calendars
- Monday, 13 April 2026
Akan	Nkyidwo
Armenian	27 Ahekani 1475
Aztec	Tlaxochimaco 13, 3 Cipactli
Babylonian	24 Adaru, 2336 SE
Balinese pawukon	Menga, Kajeng, Sri, Keliwon, Urukung, Coma of Landep, Sri, Erangan, Suka
Bengali	30 Chaitro, BS 1432
Chinese	Yin Fire Snake・Roof Mansion; Fire Horse Year, Month 2, Day 26 (Qingming, 7 days until Guyu)
Common Era	13 April 2026 CE
Coptic	5 Parmouti, AM 1742
Egyptian	2 Epagomenae, 2774 NE
Ethiopian	5 Miyāzyā, 2018 Amätä Məhrät
French Republican	Décade III, Quartidi de Germinal de l'Année 234 de la République
Gregorian	13 April, AD 2026
Hebrew	26 Nisan, AM 5786; Omer 11
Hindu	Dhaniṣṭhā・Śubha; Solar: 31 Caitra, 1947 SE; Lunisolar: Ekādaśī, Kṛishna pakṣa of Caitra, 2083 VE; Rāudra・5126 KY・1,872,678
Icelandic	Mánudagur, 21 Einmánuður 2025
Islamic	25 Shawwal, AH 1447 (using tabular method)
ISO week date	2026-W16-1
Japanese	26 Kisaragi, Reiwa 8 (Seimei, 7 days until Kokuu)
Julian	31 March, AD 2026 (AM 7534)
Julian day	2461144
Korean	26 Tokkidal, 4359 DE
Maya	13.0.13.9.1; 14 Pop, 3 Imix
Roman	Pridie Kalendas Apriles, MMDCCLXXIX AUC
Solar Hijri	24 Farvardin, SH 1405
Tibetan	26 dbo, me pho rta 2153 or 1772 or 1000

<<	April					>>
Su	Mo	Tu	We	Th	Fr	Sa
			1	2	3	4
5	6	7	8	9	10	11
12	13	14	15	16	17	18
19	20	21	22	23	24	25
26	27	28	29	30
2026

April 13 in recent years
2026 (Monday)
2025 (Sunday)
2024 (Saturday)
2023 (Thursday)
2022 (Wednesday)
2021 (Tuesday)
2020 (Monday)
2019 (Saturday)
2018 (Friday)
2017 (Thursday)

April 13 is the 103rd day of the year (104th in leap years) in the Gregorian calendar; 262 days remain until the end of the year.

== Events ==
=== Pre-1600 ===
- 989 – The death of Bardas Phokas the Younger in the battle of Abydos ends his second rebellion against Byzantine Emperor Basil II.
- 1055 – Election of Pope Victor II following the death of Pope Leo IX in the previous year.
- 1111 – Henry V, King of Germany, is crowned Holy Roman Emperor by pope Paschal II.
- 1175 – Saladin routs his Muslim opponents, the Zengids, in the battle of the Horns of Hama, consolidating his control over Syria except for Aleppo.
- 1204 – Constantinople falls to the Crusaders of the Fourth Crusade, temporarily ending the Byzantine Empire.
- 1455 – Thirteen Years' War: the beginning of the Battle for Kneiphof.

=== 1601–1900 ===
- 1612 – Samurai Miyamoto Musashi defeats Sasaki Kojirō in a duel at Funajima island.
- 1613 – Samuel Argall, having captured Pocahontas in Passapatanzy, Virginia, sets off with her to Jamestown with the intention of exchanging her for English prisoners held by her father.
- 1699 – The Sikh religion is formalised as the Khalsa – the brotherhood of Warrior-Saints – by Guru Gobind Singh in northern India, in accordance with the Nanakshahi calendar.
- 1742 – George Frideric Handel's oratorio Messiah makes its world premiere in Dublin, Ireland.
- 1777 – American Revolutionary War: American forces are ambushed and defeated in the Battle of Bound Brook, New Jersey.
- 1829 – The Roman Catholic Relief Act 1829 gives Roman Catholics in the United Kingdom the right to vote and to sit in Parliament.
- 1849 – Lajos Kossuth presents the Hungarian Declaration of Independence in a closed session of the National Assembly.
- 1861 – American Civil War: Union forces surrender Fort Sumter to Confederate forces.
- 1865 – American Civil War: Raleigh, North Carolina is occupied by Union forces.
- 1870 – The New York City Metropolitan Museum of Art is founded.
- 1873 – The Colfax massacre: More than 60 to 150 black men are murdered in Colfax, Louisiana, while surrendering to a mob of former Confederate soldiers and members of the Ku Klux Klan.

=== 1901–present ===
- 1909 – The 31 March Incident leads to the overthrow of Sultan Abdul Hamid II.
- 1919 – Jallianwala Bagh massacre: British Indian Army troops led by Brigadier-General Reginald Dyer kill approximately 379–1,000 unarmed demonstrators including men and women in Amritsar, India. Approximately 1,500 are injured.
- 1924 – A.E.K., a major Greek multi-sport club, is established in Athens by Greek refugees from Constantinople.
- 1941 – A pact of neutrality between the USSR and Japan is signed.
- 1943 – World War II: The discovery of mass graves of Polish prisoners of war killed by Soviet forces in the Katyń Forest Massacre is announced, causing a diplomatic rift between the Polish government-in-exile in London and the Soviet Union, which denies responsibility.
- 1943 – The Jefferson Memorial is dedicated in Washington, D.C., on the 200th anniversary of President Thomas Jefferson's birth.
- 1945 – World War II: German troops kill more than 1,000 political and military prisoners in Gardelegen, Germany.
- 1945 – World War II: Soviet and Bulgarian forces capture Vienna.
- 1948 – In an ambush, 78 Jewish doctors, nurses and medical students from Hadassah Hospital, and a British soldier, are massacred by Arabs in Sheikh Jarrah. This event came to be known as the Hadassah medical convoy massacre.
- 1953 – CIA director Allen Dulles launches the mind-control program Project MKUltra.
- 1960 – The United States launches Transit 1-B, the world's first satellite navigation system.
- 1964 – At the Academy Awards, Sidney Poitier becomes the first African-American man to win the Best Actor award for the 1963 film Lilies of the Field.
- 1970 – At 10:08 PM EST an oxygen tank aboard the Apollo 13 Service Module explodes, putting the crew in great danger and causing major damage to the Apollo command and service module (codenamed "Odyssey") while en route to the Moon.
- 1972 – The Universal Postal Union decides to recognize the People's Republic of China as the only legitimate Chinese representative, effectively expelling the Republic of China administering Taiwan.
- 1972 – Vietnam War: The Battle of An Lộc begins.
- 1975 – Beirut bus massacre: A confrontation between Phalangist paramilitaries and PLO militia marks the start of the 15-year Lebanese Civil War.
- 1976 – The United States Treasury Department reintroduces the two-dollar bill as a Federal Reserve Note on Thomas Jefferson's 233rd birthday as part of the United States Bicentennial celebration.
- 1976 – Forty workers die in the Lapua Cartridge Factory explosion, the deadliest industrial accident in modern Finnish history.
- 1996 – Two women and four children are killed after an Israeli helicopter fires rockets at an ambulance in Mansouri, Lebanon.
- 1997 – Tiger Woods becomes the youngest golfer to win the Masters Tournament.
- 2006 – The United Front for Democratic Change's attack on the Chadian capital of N'Djamena is repelled by the Chadian army
- 2009 – A fire destroys a homeless hostel and kills at least 22 people in Kamień Pomorski, Poland.
- 2013 – Salam Fayyad resigns as Prime Minister of the Palestinian National Authority following an ongoing dispute with President Mahmoud Abbas.
- 2013 – Lion Air Flight 904 crashes on approach to Ngurah Rai International Airport in Denpasar, Indonesia, injuring 40 people.
- 2014 – Three people are killed in a shooting in Overland Park, Kansas.
- 2023 – The house of Jack Teixeira is raided in an investigation into leaked Pentagon documents; he is arrested on the same day.
- 2024 – Six people and the perpetrator are killed and twelve others injured in a mass stabbing at Westfield Bondi Junction shopping centre in Sydney, Australia.
- 2025 – Rory McIlroy wins the Masters Tournament, becoming just the sixth person to complete the Grand Slam in golf.

== Births ==
=== Pre-1600 ===
- 1229 – Louis II, Duke of Bavaria (died 1294)
- 1350 – Margaret III, Countess of Flanders (died 1405)
- 1506 – Peter Faber, French priest and theologian, co-founded the Society of Jesus (died 1546)
- 1519 – Catherine de' Medici, Italian-French wife of Henry II of France (died 1589)
- 1570 – Guy Fawkes, English soldier, member of the Gunpowder Plot (probable; died 1606)
- 1573 – Christina of Holstein-Gottorp (died 1625)
- 1593 – Thomas Wentworth, 1st Earl of Strafford, English soldier and politician, Lord Lieutenant of Ireland (died 1641)

=== 1601–1900 ===
- 1618 – Roger de Rabutin, Comte de Bussy, French author (died 1693)
- 1636 – Hendrik van Rheede, Dutch botanist (died 1691)
- 1648 – Jeanne Marie Bouvier de la Motte Guyon, French mystic (died 1717)
- 1713 – Pierre Jélyotte, French tenor (died 1797)
- 1729 – Thomas Percy, Irish bishop and poet (died 1811)
- 1732 – Frederick North, Lord North, English politician, Prime Minister of Great Britain (died 1792)
- 1735 – Isaac Low, American merchant and politician, founded the New York Chamber of Commerce (died 1791)
- 1743 – Thomas Jefferson, American lawyer and politician, 3rd President of the United States (died 1826)
- 1747 – Louis Philippe II, Duke of Orléans (died 1793)
- 1764 – Laurent de Gouvion Saint-Cyr, French general and politician, French Minister of War (died 1830)
- 1769 – Thomas Lawrence, English painter and educator (died 1830)
- 1771 – Richard Trevithick, Cornish-English engineer and explorer (died 1833)
- 1780 – Alexander Mitchell, Irish engineer, invented the Screw-pile lighthouse (died 1868)
- 1784 – Friedrich Graf von Wrangel, Prussian field marshal (died 1877)
- 1787 – John Robertson, American lawyer and politician (died 1873)
- 1794 – Jean Pierre Flourens, French physiologist and academic (died 1867)
- 1802 – Leopold Fitzinger, Austrian zoologist and herpetologist (died 1884)
- 1808 – Antonio Meucci, Italian-American engineer (died 1889)
- 1810 – Félicien David, French composer (died 1876)
- 1824 – William Alexander, Irish archbishop, poet, and theologian (died 1911)
- 1825 – Thomas D'Arcy McGee, Irish-Canadian journalist and politician (died 1868)
- 1828 – Josephine Butler, English feminist and social reformer (died 1906)
- 1828 – Joseph Lightfoot, English bishop and theologian (died 1889)
- 1832 – Juan Montalvo, Ecuadorian author and diplomat (died 1889)
- 1841 – Louis-Ernest Barrias, French sculptor and academic (died 1905)
- 1850 – Arthur Matthew Weld Downing, Irish astronomer (died 1917)
- 1851 – Robert Abbe, American surgeon and radiologist (died 1928)
- 1851 – William Quan Judge, Irish occultist and theosophist (died 1896)
- 1852 – Frank Winfield Woolworth, American businessman, founded the F. W. Woolworth Company (died 1919)
- 1854 – Lucy Craft Laney, American founder of the Haines Normal and Industrial School, Augusta, Georgia (died 1933)
- 1856 – Urania Marquard Olsen, Danish-Norwegian actress and theatre director (died 1932)
- 1857 – Fanny Ingvoldstad, Norwegian painter (died 1935)
- 1860 – James Ensor, English-Belgian painter, an important influence on expressionism and surrealism (died 1949)
- 1865 – Lucie Lagerbielke, Swedish writer and painter (died 1931).
- 1866 – Butch Cassidy, American criminal (died 1908)
- 1872 – John Cameron, Scottish international footballer and manager (died 1935)
- 1872 – Alexander Roda Roda, Austrian-Croatian journalist and author (died 1945)
- 1873 – John W. Davis, American lawyer and politician, 14th United States Solicitor General (died 1955)
- 1875 – Ray Lyman Wilbur, American physician, academic, and politician, 31st United States Secretary of the Interior (died 1949)
- 1879 – Edward Bruce, American lawyer and painter (died 1943)
- 1879 – Oswald Bruce Cooper, American type designer, lettering artist, graphic designer, and educator (died 1940)
- 1880 – Charles Christie, Canadian-American businessman, co-founded the Christie Film Company (died 1955)
- 1885 – Vean Gregg, American baseball player (died 1964)
- 1885 – Juhan Kukk, Estonian politician, Head of State of Estonia (died 1942)
- 1885 – György Lukács, Hungarian philosopher and critic (died 1971)
- 1885 – Pieter Sjoerds Gerbrandy, Dutch politician (died 1961)
- 1887 – Gordon S. Fahrni, Canadian physician and golfer (died 1995)
- 1889 – Herbert Yardley, American cryptologist and author (died 1958)
- 1890 – Frank Murphy, American jurist and politician, 56th United States Attorney General (died 1949)
- 1890 – Dadasaheb Torne, Indian director and producer (died 1960)
- 1891 – Maurice Buckley, Australian sergeant, Victoria Cross recipient (died 1921)
- 1891 – Nella Larsen, Danish/African-American nurse, librarian, and author (died 1964)
- 1891 – Robert Scholl, German accountant and politician (died 1973)
- 1892 – Sir Arthur Harris, 1st Baronet, English air marshal, head of RAF Bomber Command during World War II (died 1984)
- 1892 – Robert Watson-Watt, Scottish engineer, invented Radar (died 1973)
- 1894 – Arthur Fadden, Australian accountant and politician, 13th Prime Minister of Australia (died 1973)
- 1894 – May Brodney, Australian labour activist (died 1973)
- 1896 – Fred Barnett, English footballer (died 1982)
- 1897 – Werner Voss, German lieutenant and pilot (died 1917)
- 1899 – Alfred Mosher Butts, American architect and game designer, created Scrabble (died 1993)
- 1899 – Harold Osborn, American high jumper and decathlete (died 1975)
- 1900 – Sorcha Boru, American potter and ceramic sculptor (died 2006)
- 1900 – Pierre Molinier, French painter and photographer (died 1976)

=== 1901–present ===
- 1901 – Jacques Lacan, French psychiatrist and psychoanalyst (died 1981)
- 1901 – Alan Watt, Australian public servant and diplomat, Australian Ambassador to Japan (died 1988)
- 1902 – Philippe de Rothschild, French Grand Prix driver, playwright, and producer (died 1988)
- 1902 – Marguerite Henry, American author (died 1997)
- 1904 – David Robinson, English businessman and philanthropist (died 1987)
- 1905 – Rae Johnstone, Australian jockey (died 1964)
- 1906 – Samuel Beckett, Irish novelist, poet, and playwright, Nobel Prize laureate (died 1989)
- 1906 – Bud Freeman, American saxophonist, composer, and bandleader (died 1991)
- 1907 – Harold Stassen, American lawyer and politician, 25th Governor of Minnesota (died 2001)
- 1909 – Eudora Welty, American short story writer and novelist (died 2001)
- 1911 – Ico Hitrec, Croatian footballer and manager (died 1946)
- 1911 – Jean-Louis Lévesque, Canadian businessman and philanthropist (died 1994)
- 1911 – Nino Sanzogno, Italian conductor and composer (died 1983)
- 1913 – Dave Albritton, American high jumper and coach (died 1994)
- 1913 – Kermit Tyler, American lieutenant and pilot (died 2010)
- 1914 – Orhan Veli Kanık, Turkish poet and author (died 1950)
- 1916 – Phyllis Fraser, Welsh-American actress, journalist, and publisher, co-founded Beginner Books (died 2006)
- 1917 – Robert Orville Anderson, American businessman, founded Atlantic Richfield Oil Co. (died 2007)
- 1917 – Bill Clements, American soldier, engineer, and politician, 15th United States Deputy Secretary of Defense (died 2011)
- 1919 – Roland Gaucher, French journalist and politician (died 2007)
- 1919 – Howard Keel, American actor and singer (died 2004)
- 1919 – Madalyn Murray O'Hair, American activist, founded American Atheists (died 1995)
- 1920 – Roberto Calvi, Italian banker (died 1982)
- 1920 – Claude Cheysson, French lieutenant and politician, French Minister of Foreign Affairs (died 2012)
- 1920 – Liam Cosgrave, Irish lawyer and politician, 6th Taoiseach of Ireland (died 2017)
- 1920 – Theodore L. Thomas, American chemical engineer, Patent attorney and writer (died 2005)
- 1922 – Heinz Baas, German footballer and manager (died 1994)
- 1922 – John Braine, English librarian and author (died 1986)
- 1922 – Julius Nyerere, Tanzanian politician and teacher, 1st President of Tanzania (died 1999)
- 1922 – Valve Pormeister, Estonian architect (died 2002)
- 1923 – Don Adams, American actor and director (died 2005)
- 1923 – A. H. Halsey, English sociologist and academic (died 2014)
- 1924 – John T. Biggers, American painter (died 2001)
- 1924 – Jack T. Chick, American author, illustrator, and publisher (died 2016)
- 1924 – Stanley Donen, American film director and choreographer (died 2019)
- 1926 – Ellie Lambeti, Greek actress (died 1983)
- 1926 – John Spencer-Churchill, 11th Duke of Marlborough, English businessman (died 2014)
- 1927 – Rosemary Haughton, English philosopher, theologian, and author (died 2024)
- 1927 – Maurice Ronet, French actor and director (died 1983)
- 1928 – Alan Clark, English historian and politician, Minister of State for Trade (died 1999)
- 1928 – Gianni Marzotto, Italian racing driver and businessman (died 2012)
- 1929 – Marilynn Smith, American golfer (died 2019)
- 1931 – Anita Cerquetti, Italian soprano (died 2014)
- 1931 – Robert Enrico, French director and screenwriter (died 2001)
- 1931 – Dan Gurney, American race car driver and engineer (died 2018)
- 1931 – Jon Stone, American composer, producer, and screenwriter (died 1997)
- 1932 – Orlando Letelier, Chilean-American economist and politician, Chilean Minister of National Defense (died 1976)
- 1934 – John Muckler, Canadian ice hockey player, coach, and manager (died 2021)
- 1937 – Col Joye, Australian singer-songwriter and guitarist (died 2025)
- 1937 – Edward Fox, English actor
- 1937 – Lanford Wilson, American playwright, co-founded the Circle Repertory Company (died 2011)
- 1938 – Klaus Lehnertz, German pole vaulter (died 2026)
- 1939 – Seamus Heaney, Irish poet and playwright, Nobel Prize laureate (died 2013)
- 1939 – Paul Sorvino, American actor and singer (died 2022)
- 1940 – J. M. G. Le Clézio, Breton French-Mauritian author and academic, Nobel Prize laureate
- 1940 – Vladimir Cosma, French composer, conductor and violinist
- 1940 – Max Mosley, English racing driver and engineer, co-founded March Engineering, former president of the FIA (died 2021)
- 1940 – Ruby Puryear Hearn, African-American biophysicist
- 1941 – Michael Stuart Brown, American geneticist and academic, Nobel Prize laureate
- 1941 – Jean-Marc Reiser, French author and illustrator (died 1983)
- 1942 – Bill Conti, American composer and conductor
- 1943 – Alan Jones, Australian rugby coach and radio host
- 1943 – Tim Krabbé, Dutch journalist and author
- 1944 – Susan Davis, Russian-American social worker and politician
- 1945 – Judy Nunn, Australian actress and author
- 1945 – Lowell George, American singer-songwriter and founder of Little Feat
- 1946 – Al Green, American singer-songwriter, producer, and pastor
- 1947 – Rae Armantrout, American poet and academic
- 1947 – Mike Chapman, Australian-English songwriter and producer
- 1947 – Jean-Jacques Laffont, French economist and academic (died 2004)
- 1947 – Thanos Mikroutsikos, Greek composer and politician (died 2019)
- 1948 – Nam Hae-il, South Korean admiral
- 1948 – Drago Jančar, Slovenian author and playwright
- 1948 – Mikhail Shufutinsky, Soviet and Russian singer, actor, TV presenter
- 1949 – Len Cook, New Zealand-English mathematician and statistician
- 1949 – Christopher Hitchens, English-American essayist, literary critic, and journalist (died 2011)
- 1950 – Ron Perlman, American actor
- 1950 – Tommy Raudonikis, Australian rugby league player and coach (died 2021)
- 1950 – William Sadler, American actor
- 1951 – Leszek Borysiewicz, Welsh immunologist and academic
- 1951 – Peabo Bryson, American singer (died 2026)
- 1951 – Peter Davison, English actor
- 1951 – Joachim Streich, German footballer (died 2022)
- 1951 – Max Weinberg, American musician and bandleader
- 1952 – Gabrielle Gourdeau, Canadian writer (died 2006)
- 1952 – Sam Bush, American mandolinist
- 1952 – Jonjo O'Neill, Irish jockey and trainer
- 1955 – Steve Camp, American singer-songwriter and guitarist
- 1955 – Muwenda Mutebi II, current King of Buganda Kingdom
- 1955 – Safet Sušić, Bosnian footballer and manager
- 1956 – César, Brazilian footballer (died 2024)
- 1958 – Jean-Marc Pilorget, French footballer and manager
- 1959 – John Middendorf, American mountain climber (died 2024)
- 1960 – Rudi Völler, German footballer and manager
- 1963 – Garry Kasparov, Russian chess player and author
- 1964 – Davis Love III, American golfer and sportscaster
- 1965 – Patricio Pouchulu, Argentinian architect and educator
- 1966 – Mando, Greek singer
- 1967 – Dana Barros, American basketball player and coach
- 1967 – Olga Tañón, Puerto Rican singer-songwriter
- 1970 – Ricky Schroder, American actor
- 1971 – Franck Esposito, French swimmer
- 1971 – Danie Mellor, Australian painter and sculptor
- 1971 – Bo Outlaw, American basketball player
- 1972 – Aaron Lewis, American singer-songwriter and guitarist
- 1973 – Bokeem Woodbine, American actor
- 1975 – Lou Bega, German singer
- 1976 – Jonathan Brandis, American actor (died 2003)
- 1976 – Dan Campbell, American football player and coach
- 1976 – Glenn Howerton, American actor
- 1977 – Margus Tsahkna, Estonian lawyer and politician
- 1978 – Carles Puyol, Spanish footballer
- 1979 – Baron Davis, American basketball player
- 1980 – Kelli Giddish, American actress
- 1980 – Quentin Richardson, American basketball player
- 1982 – Nellie McKay, British-American singer-songwriter, musician, and actress
- 1982 – Ty Dolla Sign, American singer, songwriter, and musician
- 1983 – Claudio Bravo, Chilean footballer
- 1983 – Hunter Pence, American baseball player
- 1984 – Anders Lindegaard, Danish footballer
- 1986 – Lorenzo Cain, American baseball player
- 1987 – Steven De Vuyst, Belgian politician
- 1988 – Allison Williams, American actress and singer
- 1988 – Anderson, Brazilian footballer
- 1989 – Josh Reynolds, Australian rugby league player
- 1991 – Josh Gordon, American football player
- 1992 – Jordan Silk, Australian cricketer
- 1993 – Melvin Gordon, American football player
- 1993 – Darrun Hilliard, American basketball player
- 1994 – Kahraba, Egyptian footballer
- 1996 – Marko Grujić, Serbian footballer
- 1997 – Mateo Cassierra, Colombian footballer
- 1997 – Kyle Walker-Peters, English footballer
- 1999 – Alessandro Bastoni, Italian footballer
- 1999 – András Schäfer, Hungarian footballer
- 2000 – Rasmus Dahlin, Swedish ice hockey player
- 2000 – Facundo Torres, Uruguayan footballer
- 2001 – Neco Williams, Welsh footballer
- 2002 – Karl Hein, Estonian footballer

== Deaths ==
=== Pre-1600 ===
- 548 – Lý Nam Đế, Vietnamese emperor (born 503)
- 585 – Hermenegild, Visigothic prince and saint
- 799 – Paul the Deacon, Italian monk and historian (born 720)
- 814 – Krum, khan of the Bulgarian Khanate
- 862 – Donald I, king of the Picts (born 812)
- 989 – Bardas Phokas, Byzantine general
- 1035 – Herbert I, Count of Maine
- 1093 – Vsevolod I of Kiev (born 1030)
- 1113 – Ida of Lorraine, saint and noblewoman (born c. 1040)
- 1138 – Simon I, Duke of Lorraine (born 1076)
- 1213 – Guy of Thouars, regent of Brittany
- 1275 – Eleanor of England (born 1215)
- 1367 – John Tiptoft, 2nd Baron Tibetot (born 1313)
- 1592 – Bartolomeo Ammannati, Italian architect and sculptor (born 1511)

=== 1601–1900 ===
- 1605 – Boris Godunov, Tsar of Russia (born 1551)
- 1612 – Sasaki Kojirō, Japanese samurai (born 1585)
- 1635 – Fakhr-al-Din II, Ottoman prince (born 1572)
- 1638 – Henri, Duke of Rohan (born 1579)
- 1641 – Richard Montagu, English bishop (born 1577)
- 1695 – Jean de La Fontaine, French author and poet (born 1621)
- 1716 – Arthur Herbert, 1st Earl of Torrington, English admiral and politician (born 1648)
- 1722 – Charles Leslie, Irish priest and theologian (born 1650)
- 1793 – Pierre Gaspard Chaumette, French botanist, lawyer, and politician (born 1763)
- 1794 – Nicolas Chamfort, French playwright and poet (born 1741)
- 1826 – Franz Danzi, German cellist, composer, and conductor (born 1763)
- 1853 – Leopold Gmelin, German chemist and academic (born 1788)
- 1853 – James Iredell, Jr., American lawyer and politician, 23rd Governor of North Carolina (born 1788)
- 1855 – Henry De la Beche, English geologist and palaeontologist (born 1796)
- 1868 – Tewodros II of Ethiopia (born 1818)
- 1878 – Bezalel HaKohen, Russian rabbi (born 1820)
- 1880 – Robert Fortune, Scottish botanist and author (born 1812)
- 1882 – Bruno Bauer, German historian and philosopher (born 1809)
- 1886 – John Humphrey Noyes, American religious leader, founded the Oneida Community (born 1811)
- 1890 – Samuel J. Randall, American captain, lawyer, and politician, 33rd Speaker of the United States House of Representatives (born 1828)

=== 1901–present ===
- 1909 – Whitley Stokes, Anglo-Irish lawyer and scholar (born 1830)
- 1910 – William Quiller Orchardson, Scottish-English painter and educator (born 1832)
- 1911 – John McLane, Scottish-American politician, 50th Governor of New Hampshire (born 1852)
- 1911 – George Washington Glick, American lawyer and politician, 9th Governor of Kansas (born 1827)
- 1912 – Takuboku Ishikawa, Japanese poet and author (born 1886)
- 1917 – Diamond Jim Brady, American businessman and philanthropist (born 1856)
- 1918 – Lavr Kornilov, Russian general (born 1870)
- 1920 – Stefanos Streit, Greek jurist, banker and politician (born 1896)
- 1927 – Georg Voigt, German politician, Mayor of Frankfurt (born 1866)
- 1927 – Sabás Reyes Salazar, Mexican Catholic priest (born 1888)
- 1936 – Konstantinos Demertzis, Greek politician 129th Prime Minister of Greece (born 1876)
- 1938 – Grey Owl, English-Canadian environmentalist and author (born 1888)
- 1941 – Annie Jump Cannon, American astronomer and academic (born 1863)
- 1941 – William Twaits, Canadian soccer player (born 1879)
- 1942 – Henk Sneevliet, Dutch politician (born 1883)
- 1942 – Anton Uesson, Estonian engineer and politician, 17th Mayor of Tallinn (born 1879)
- 1944 – Cécile Chaminade, French pianist and composer (born 1857)
- 1945 – Ernst Cassirer, Polish-American philosopher and academic (born 1874)
- 1954 – Samuel Jones, American high jumper (born 1880)
- 1954 – Angus Lewis Macdonald, Canadian lawyer and politician, 12th Premier of Nova Scotia (born 1890)
- 1956 – Emil Nolde, Danish-German painter and educator (born 1867)
- 1959 – Eduard van Beinum, Dutch pianist, violinist, and conductor (born 1901)
- 1961 – John A. Bennett, American soldier (born 1936)
- 1962 – Culbert Olson, American lawyer and politician, 29th Governor of California (born 1876)
- 1964 – Kristian Krefting, Norwegian footballer and chemical engineer (born 1891)
- 1966 – Abdul Salam Arif, Iraqi colonel and politician, 2nd President of Iraq (born 1921)
- 1966 – Carlo Carrà, Italian painter (born 1881)
- 1966 – Georges Duhamel, French soldier and author (born 1884)
- 1967 – Nicole Berger, French actress (born 1934)
- 1969 – Ambrogio Gianotti, Italian partigiano and priest (born 1901)
- 1969 – Alfred Karindi, Estonian pianist and composer (born 1901)
- 1971 – Michel Brière, Canadian ice hockey player (born 1949)
- 1971 – Juhan Smuul, Estonian author, poet, and screenwriter (born 1921)
- 1973 – Henry Darger, American janitor and author (born 1892)
- 1975 – Larry Parks, American actor and singer (born 1914)
- 1975 – François Tombalbaye, Chadian soldier, academic, and politician, 1st President of Chad (born 1918)
- 1978 – Jack Chambers, Canadian painter and director (born 1931)
- 1978 – Funmilayo Ransome-Kuti, Nigerian educator and women's rights activist (born 1900)
- 1980 – Markus Höttinger, Austrian racing driver (born 1956)
- 1983 – Gerry Hitchens, English footballer (born 1934)
- 1983 – Theodore Stephanides, Greek physician, author, and poet (born 1896)
- 1984 – Ralph Kirkpatrick, American harpsichordist and musicologist (born 1911)
- 1984 – Dionysis Papagiannopoulos, Greek actor (born 1912)
- 1988 – Jean Gascon, Canadian actor and director (born 1920)
- 1992 – Maurice Sauvé, Canadian economist and politician (born 1923)
- 1992 – Feza Gürsey, Turkish mathematician and physicist (born 1921)
- 1992 – Daniel Pollock, Australian actor (born 1968)
- 1993 – Wallace Stegner, American novelist, short story writer, and essayist (born 1909)
- 1996 – Leila Mackinlay, English author and educator (born 1910)
- 1997 – Bryant Bowles, American soldier and white supremacist, founded the National Association for the Advancement of White People (born 1920)
- 1997 – Alan Cooley, Australian public servant (born 1920)
- 1997 – Dorothy Frooks, American author and actress (born 1896)
- 1997 – Voldemar Väli, Estonian wrestler (born 1903)
- 1998 – Patrick de Gayardon, French skydiver and base jumper (born 1960)
- 1999 – Ortvin Sarapu, Estonian-New Zealand chess player and author (born 1924)
- 1999 – Willi Stoph, German engineer and politician, 2nd Prime Minister of East Germany (born 1914)
- 2000 – Giorgio Bassani, Italian author and poet (born 1916)
- 2000 – Frenchy Bordagaray, American baseball player and manager (born 1910)
- 2004 – Caron Keating, Northern Irish television host (born 1962)
- 2005 – Johnnie Johnson, American pianist and songwriter (born 1924)
- 2005 – Phillip Pavia, American painter and sculptor (born 1912)
- 2006 – Muriel Spark, Scottish novelist, poet, and critic (born 1918)
- 2008 – John Archibald Wheeler, American physicist and academic (born 1911)
- 2012 – Cecil Chaudhry, Pakistani pilot, academic, and activist (born 1941)
- 2012 – Shūichi Higurashi, Japanese illustrator (born 1936)
- 2013 – Stephen Dodgson, English composer and educator (born 1924)
- 2014 – Ernesto Laclau, Argentinian-Spanish philosopher and theorist (born 1935)
- 2014 – Michael Ruppert, American journalist and author (born 1951)
- 2015 – Eduardo Galeano, Uruguayan journalist and author (born 1940)
- 2015 – Günter Grass, German novelist, poet, playwright, and illustrator, Nobel Prize laureate (born 1927)
- 2015 – Herb Trimpe, American author and illustrator (born 1939)
- 2017 – Dan Rooney, American football executive and former United States Ambassador to Ireland (born 1932)
- 2018 – Art Bell, American radio host (born 1945)
- 2022 – Michel Bouquet, French stage and film actor (born 1925)
- 2022 – Gloria Parker, American musician and bandleader (born 1921)
- 2024 – Faith Ringgold, American artist and author (born 1930)
- 2025 – Richard Armitage, American diplomat and government official (born 1945)
- 2025 – Mario Vargas Llosa, Peruvian novelist and writer, Nobel Prize laureate (born 1936)
- 2025 – Jean Marsh, English actress and screenwriter (born 1934)
- 2026 – Moya Brennan, Irish singer-songwriter and harp player (born 1952)
- 2026 – Dave McGinnis, American football player and coach (born 1951)

== Holidays and observances ==
- Christian feast day:
  - Caradoc
  - Ida of Louvain
  - Pope Martin I
  - Margaret of Castello
  - Sabás Reyes Salazar
- April 13 (Eastern Orthodox liturgics)
- Songkran
  - Songkran (Thailand)
  - Water-Sprinkling Festival
- Vaisakhi (between 1902 and 2011)
