= Ellendale, Delaware =

- Town
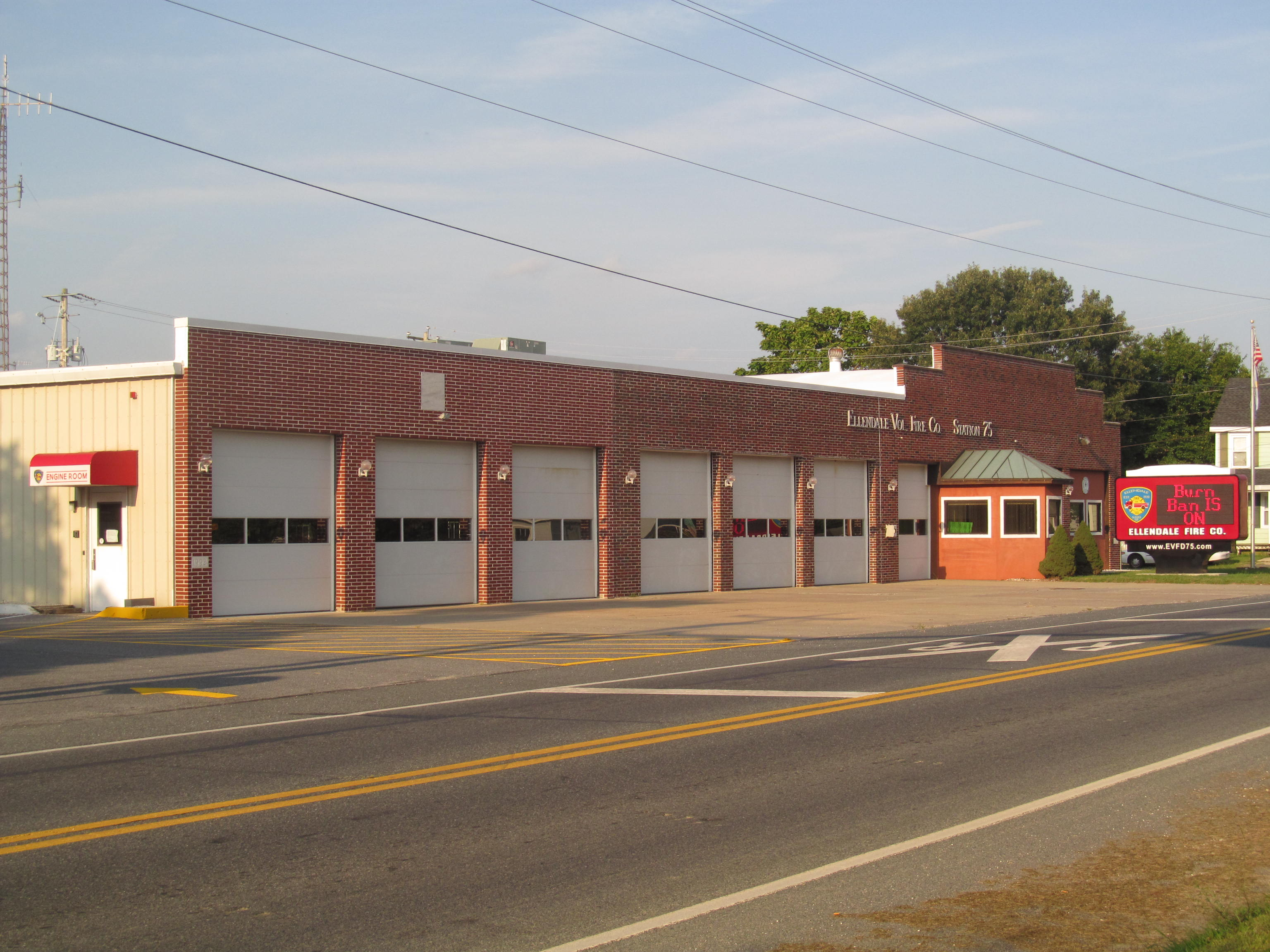
- Ellendale Fire Company

- Seal
- Nickname: The Gateway to Delaware's Resort Beaches
- Location of Ellendale in Sussex County, Delaware (left) and of Sussex County in Delaware (right)

- Location of Ellendale in Delaware Ellendale (the United States)
- Coordinates: 38°48′25″N 75°25′22″W
- Country: United States
- State: Delaware
- County: Sussex
- Settled: 1866
- Incorporated: March 30, 1905

Area
  - Total: 1.46 sq mi (3.78 km^{2})
  - Land: 1.46 sq mi (3.78 km^{2})
  - Water: 0 sq mi (0.00 km^{2})
- Elevation: 49 ft (15 m)

Population (2020)
  - Total: 487
  - Density: 334/sq mi (129/km^{2})
- Time zone: UTC−5 (Eastern (EST))
  - Summer (DST): UTC−4 (EDT)
- ZIP Code: 19941
- Area code: 302
- FIPS code: 10-24020
- GNIS feature ID: 213934
- Website: ellendale.delaware.gov

Ellendale is a town in Sussex County, Delaware, United States. The population was 487 at the 2020 census, an increase of 27.8% since the 2010 census, and a 48.9% increase since the year 2000. It is part of the Salisbury, Maryland-Delaware Metropolitan Statistical Area. Ellendale is the "Gateway to Delaware's Resort Beaches" because it is the town located on U.S. Route 113, the resort area's westernmost border, and Delaware Route 16, the resort area's northernmost border with the eastern border being the Delaware Bay and Atlantic Ocean and the southern border being the state line with Maryland.

== History ==
=== Early history ===
Ellendale started as a forest and swamp on the divide between the Chesapeake Bay and Delaware Bay. The swamp was the hunting grounds of the Nanticoke tribe until they were driven out by the Lenape tribe in the Battle Green near Chestnut Ridge, a hill on Ellendale's north side. The Lenape Trace, a main thoroughfare of a trail, passed through Ellendale as a Native American trade route from Pocomoke City, Maryland to Marcus Hook, Pennsylvania. With the arrival of Europeans, the Ellendale area was a province of fur traders and hunters. Early in the 18th century, farming and timbering pushed back the swamp that once covered the area. The tract of land on which the town would later be built was originally deeded in 1740 as "Bennett's Pleasure".

=== Black Camp Insurrection ===
The "Nanticoke Swamp", as the Ellendale Swamp was then called, was depicted as a place where criminals routinely hid from the law in the depositions of a 1759 murder that occurred. One of the main causes being the issue of jurisdiction as both Maryland and Delaware were in a boundary dispute and claimed the area. The Ellendale Swamp became a refuge for Loyalists at the time of the 1780 Black Camp Insurrection during the American Revolution. Harold Hancock describes the insurrection in his History of Sussex County: "With the removal of the British from Philadelphia in the spring of 1778, the number of enemy vessels in Delaware Bay decreased, and the activities of Sussex County Tories diminished. Only one other insurrection in Sussex County occurred – the famous Black Camp Rebellion of 1780. The insurrectionists were mainly from Cedar Creek and Slaughter Neck Hundred, and their headquarters were in a swamp about six miles (10 km) north of Georgetown. Their leaders, Bartholomew Banynum (Banum) and William Dutton, had about 400 men formed in "Associations" or militia companies. An investigator reported the causes as follows: ‘Some of these ignorant people were for opposing all law, others for establishing what they called the King’s Laws – and others for opposing the payment of taxes – but generally seem to have believed that all to the southward of Chesapeake Bay had laid down their arms and submitted to the King’s Laws – and that they should very easy make Sussex County do the same.’

Militia from Kent County dispersed the insurrectionists. Some were sent off to serve in the Continental Army, and thirty-seven were indicted for treason in the State Supreme Court. Eight were ordered to be hanged ‘by the neck but not till you be dead, for then your bowels must be taken out and burnt before your face, then your head must be severed from your body, and your body divided into four Quarters, and these must be at the disposal of the Supreme Authority in the State. Fortunately this sentence which was customary for treason was not carried out, and all the participants were pardoned by the General Assembly on November 4, 1780."

There were two small villages in the area of Ellendale's current location by 1790. They were Fleatown (or Federalsburg) to the north, and New Market to the east, both of which later became ghost towns with the establishment of Ellendale.

=== 19th century ===
In the Federal era, the Old State Road was built to connect the newly founded county seat of Georgetown with the state capital of Dover. With emancipation, African Americans took up free lives in the area and the railroads came after the American Civil War. Ellendale was founded in the early 19th century and surveyed in 1866–1867. Ellendale was first settled near the Morris Tavern Crossroads, near the current Old State Road and Main Street intersection, by a handful of families. The town is rumored to be named after either the daughter of Whig Republican Alfred Short, a state legislator, the wife of Dr. John S. Prettyman who laid out the town, or the daughter of Mr. Thomas William Dale, the chief engineer of the railroad survey team. Ellendale's current site was established in 1866 when the families moved east to settle around the Junction and Breakwater Railroad Depot. On July 16, 1873, the Ellendale Methodist Episcopal Church purchased land to erect a church, parsonage, and school. Ellendale's economy rapidly advanced as the RJ Clendaniel Sawmill, the Jester & Reed Canning Company, a brick yard, several peach evaporating and canning companies, basket factory, the Phillip J Ritter Ketchup Company, Ellendale Excelsior Company, and button factory opened in the town. The railroad was purchased by the Pennsylvania Railroad in 1905 and that same year the town was formally incorporated. In February 1895, the Queen Anne's Railroad was authorized by the Delaware legislature to extend its rail lines across the state to Lewes. The goal of the company was to establish a direct link between Baltimore and Delaware's coastal resorts. This additional rail line passed through Ellendale and provided passenger, freight, and mail services as far west as Queenstown, Maryland (with links to Baltimore via steamship) and east to Rehoboth Beach (with links to Cape May, New Jersey via steamship) with the first passenger trains passing through in 1897. A post office was erected, with a large second floor room that was used by the Independent Order of Red Men, a break off group of the Improved Order of Red Men that was established in the town, at the site of what is now the Town Hall.

=== 20th century to present ===
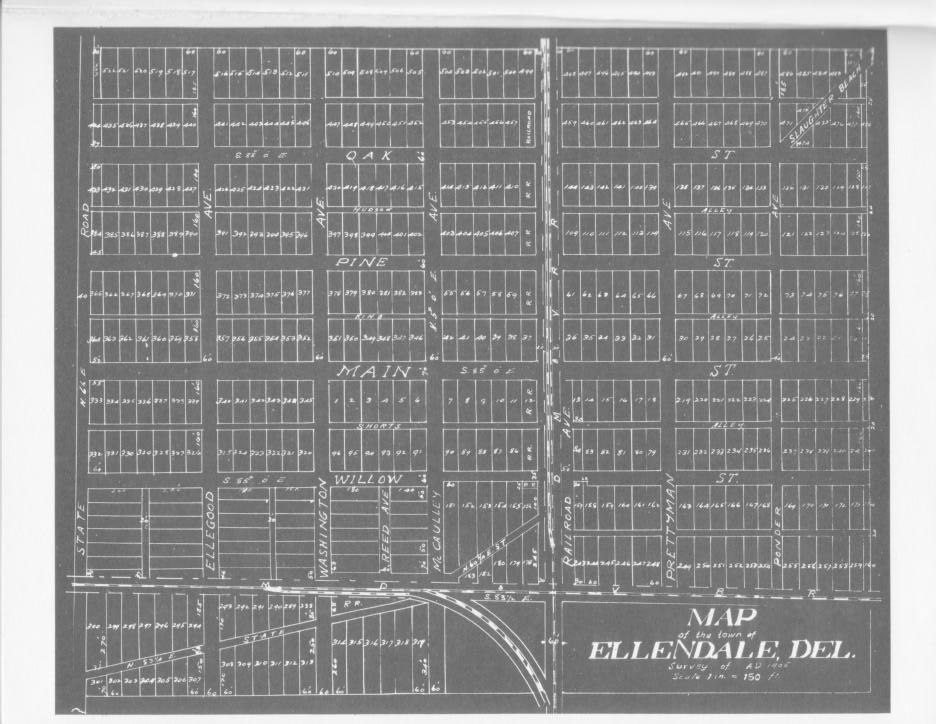
Ellendale as surveyed in 1906

In 1918, the DuPont Highway (now known as DuPont Boulevard and U.S. 113) was completed. While this was seen as a great boon to the town, it would eventually lead to the decline of the railroad and the town's economy, leading to the closing of all the towns factories. In May 1920, after several fires in the town, the Town Council met to establish a fire department to protect the citizens and businesses of Ellendale and surrounding communities. The newly formed fire department purchased a Ford Model T fire truck for $1400 from the Viscose Silk Company in Marcus Hook, Pennsylvania. The formation of a police department followed soon after with the town of Ellendale hiring its first police officer, William Bennett, in June 1921.

New schools were built in the 1920s. In 1920, the Ellendale School 125 was built in the International style on Main Street on the towns west side, and the Ellendale Colored School 195C, was built between 1922 and 1925 on North Old State Road after funding was provided by the DuPont family. By the middle of the 1920s, with profits declining and competition for its other lines increasing, the Pennsylvania Railroad decided to abandon a large portion of the railway. The Denton, Maryland to Lewes section was purchased by the Maryland & Delaware Coast Railway, but with the decline of the locomotive as vehicle traffic increased, the line was again scheduled to be abandoned in 1931. The state of Delaware eventually purchased the portion of the line from Ellendale to Milton to maintain a freight link, making this section the last operable section of one that once spanned over 100 miles (160 km). Over sixty residents of Ellendale served in World War I, World War II, the Korean War, and Vietnam War.

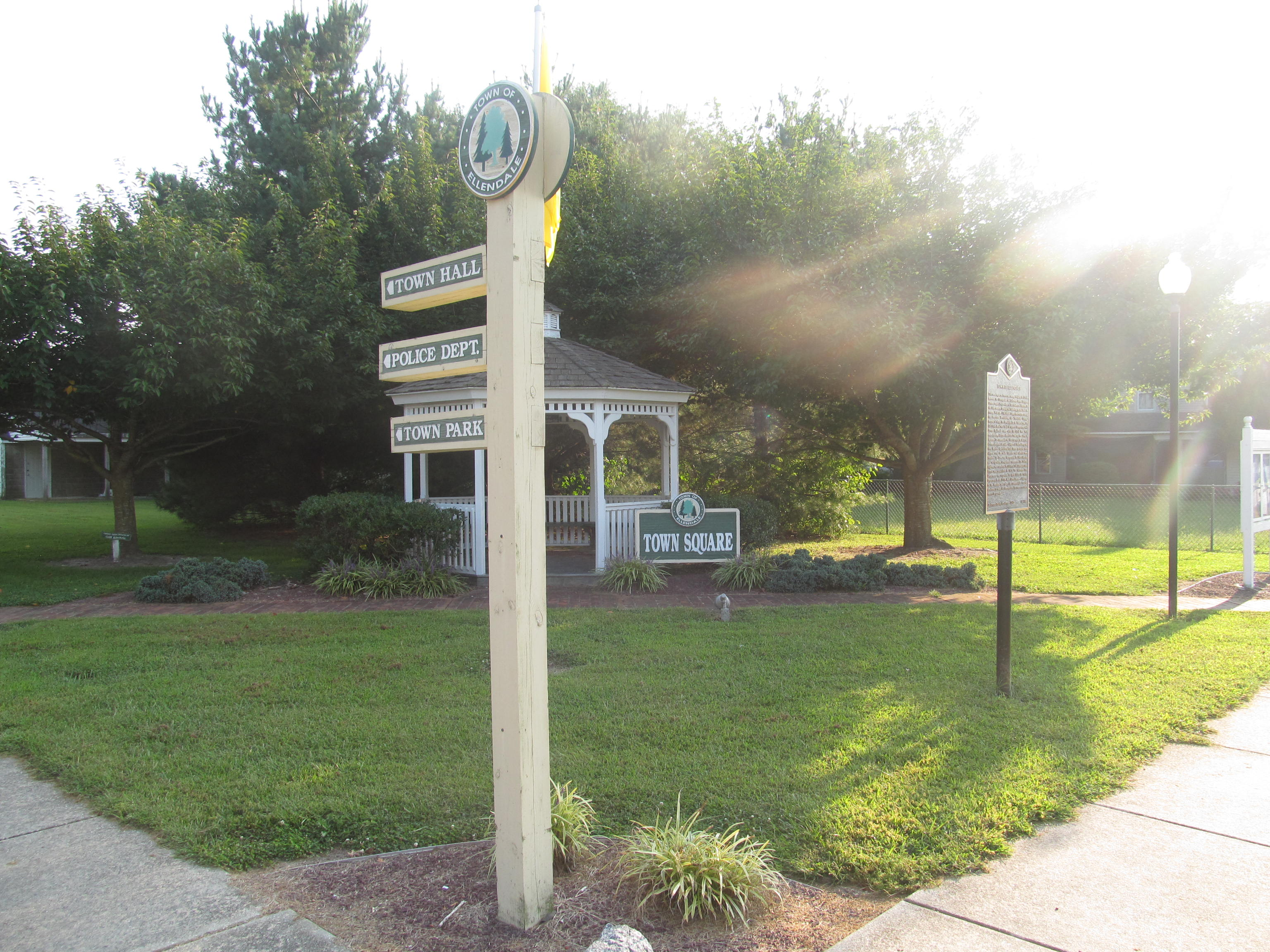
The Ellendale Town Square where town notices are posted.

In 1927 the Lincoln and Ellendale Electric Company was established bringing electricity to the residents of the town for the first time. Also in 1927 the Ellendale State Forest was established by the State Highway Department. When it was turned over to the State Forestry Department in 1932, it totalled 40 acres (160,000 m^{2}), today it has been expanded and combined with the Redden State Forest to well over 5,000 acres (20 km^{2}). The Appenzeller Tract in Ellendale, a small 45-acre (180,000 m^{2}) section, was a gift to the state from the DuPont family. A large woods fire between Ellendale, Georgetown, and Milton burned over 38,000 acres (150 km^{2}) in 1930 and forced the General Assembly to pass a series of forest protection laws establishing a fire control system which included building a 120-foot (37 m) fire tower just outside Ellendale to alert people of fires.

In the 1950s, numerous school districts in Kent and Sussex Counties, including Ellendale, continued to fight against desegregation after the ruling of Brown v. Board of Education. The protests which begin at the Milford School District, eventually bringing about a lawsuit that went to the Delaware Supreme Court which ruled that while segregation was unconstitutional, it did not require immediate desegregation. This was further bolstered by the findings of Griffin v. County School Board of Prince Edward County. Bryant Bowles, President of the National Association for the Advancement of White People led several anti-desegregation rallies and boycotts in the area, including Ellendale, that resulted in decreased attendance at the schools. Ellendale School 125 and Ellendale Colored School 195C reached an agreement on consolidation, but attorney Louis L. Redding complained to the Department of Public Instruction that black teachers were being subjected to scrutiny that their white counterparts were not. After desegregation, all students were educated at Ellendale School 125.

The Ellendale Town Council reorganized a police department in the 1970s. Due to fiscal constraints, the department was shut down again in the 1980s. After being restarted in the 1990s, the economic crash that started with the housing crisis caused Congress to cut funding to community policing grants and the town was forced to cut its department down to one part-time officer.

On September 27, 2008, the town of Ellendale passed its first annexation vote, 69 for to 37 against, since the town was incorporated in 1905. The 5-acre (20,000 m^{2}) parcel at the corner of Main Street and South Old State Road will be used for commercial purposes. Since 2022, the town has annexed more than 625 acres (2.53 km^{2}) of surrounding properties and their associated residential and commercial developments, which has more than tripled the land area of the town, and has the potential to increase the town population to over 5,500 residents.

The Ellendale State Forest Picnic Facility and Teddy's Tavern are listed on the National Register of Historic Places.

== Geography ==
Ellendale is located at 38°48′25″N 75°25′22″W.

According to the United States Census Bureau, the town has a total area of 0.2 square mile (0.6 km^{2}), all land.

== Demographics ==
Historical population
Census	Pop.	Note	%±
1910	216		—
1920	250		15.7%
1930	268		7.2%
1940	287		7.1%
1950	321		11.8%
1960	370		15.3%
1970	399		7.8%
1980	361		−9.5%
1990	313		−13.3%
2000	327		4.5%
2010	381		16.5%
2020	487		27.8%
U.S. Decennial Census

As of the census of 2020 there were 487 people, an increase of 27.8% from the year 2010. The population density was 1,145.9 inhabitants per square mile (442.4/km^{2}). There were 216 housing units at an average density of 508.2 per square mile (196.2/km^{2}). The racial makeup of the town was 53.2% White, 28.7% African American, 0.1% Native American, 0.1% Asian, 0% from Native Hawaiian and Other Pacific Islander, 6.1% from other races, and 9.9% from two or more races. Hispanic or Latino of any race were 6.6% of the population.

There were 205 households, out of which 50% had children under the age of 18 living with them, 39.5% were married couples living together, 4.3% had a male householder with no spouse present, 41.9% had a female householder with no husband present, and 14.1% were non-families. 7.8% of all households were made up of individuals, and 3.9% had someone living alone who was 65 years of age or older. The average household size was 3.66 and the average family size was 3.78.

In the town, the population was spread out, with 20.9% under the age of 18, 12.7% from 18 to 24, 23.6% from 25 to 34, 19.9% from 35 to 44, 29.3% from 45 to 64, and 11.9% who were 65 years of age or older. The median age was 27.2 years. For every 100 females, there were 94.6 males. For every 100 females age 18 and over, there were 98.6 males.

The median income for a household in the town was $55,268, a 49% increase from 2010, and the mean income was $62,238. Males had a median income of $21,875 versus $17,614 for females. The per capita income for the town was $14,831. About 7.2% of families and 15.3% of the population were below the poverty line, including 32.3% of those under age 18 and 22.2% of those age 65 or over.

As of 2010, the Ellendale region's population (for the entire zip code) was 2,522 people. Since 2000, it has had a population growth of 13.1%. The median home cost in the Ellendale region is $185,000. Home appreciation the last year has been -2.5%. Compared to the rest of the country, Ellendale's cost of living is 14.4% lower than the U.S. average. The public schools serving the Ellendale region spend $7,073 per student. The average school expenditure in the U.S. is $6,058. There are about 18 students per teacher in the Ellendale region. The unemployment rate in the Ellendale region is 2.7% (U.S. avg. is 4.6%). Recent job growth is positive as Ellendale region jobs have shown an increase of 0.6%. The chart below shows the cost of living for the Ellendale regions versus the average cost of living for the rest of the United States.

Cost Of Living	Ellendale, DE	United States
Overall	86	100
Food	104	100
Health	96	100
Housing	57	100
Utilities	120	100
Transportation	95	100
Miscellaneous	98	100

== Town government ==
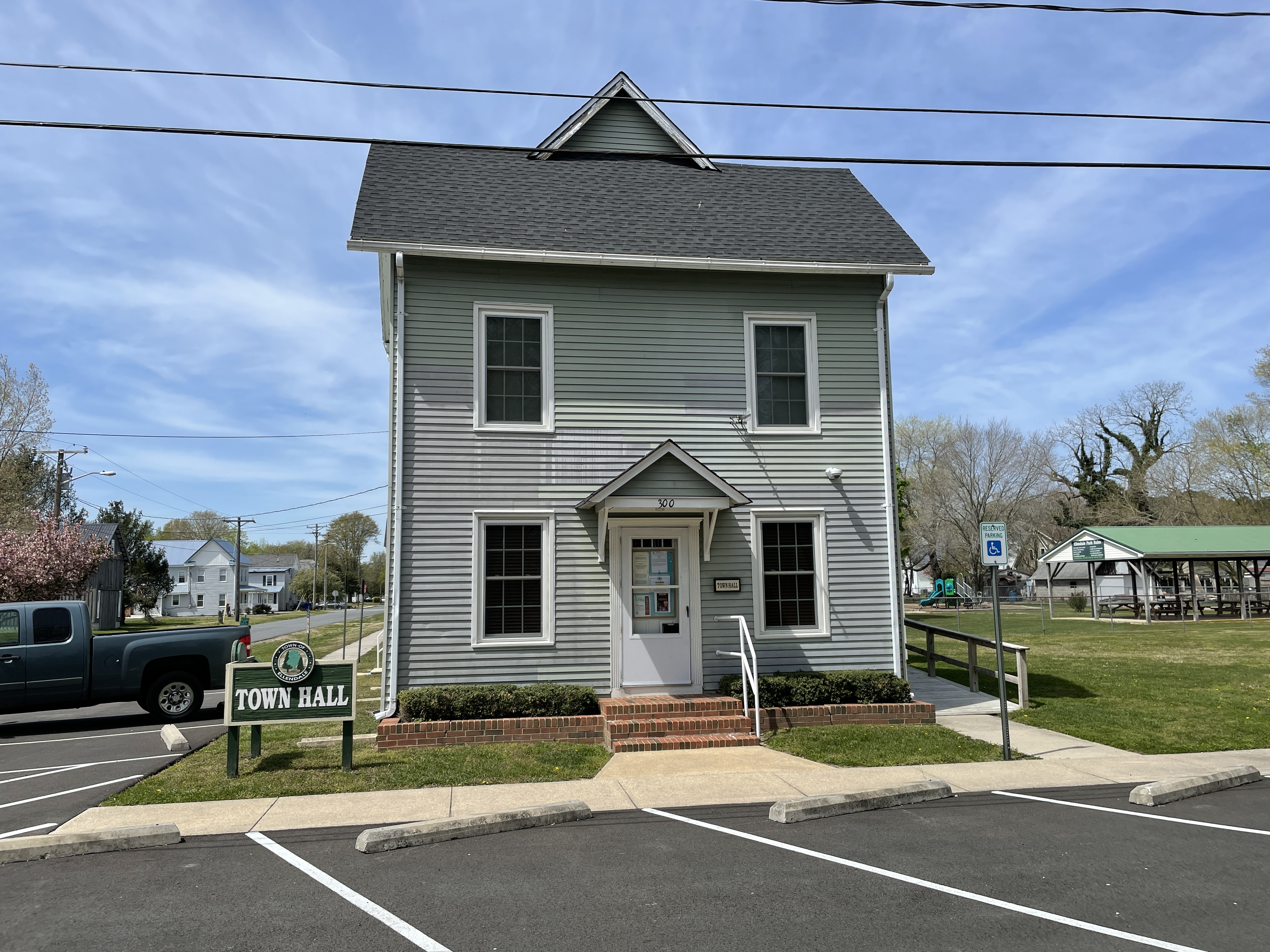
The Ellendale Town Hall located at the corner of Willow Street & McCaulley Avenue. The town police station is located on the 2nd floor.

Ellendale's government is a five-person town council with each member elected or appointed if there are not enough candidates, to a two-year term and no term limits. The town council meets the first Wednesday in each month.

Town planning and zoning is done by the five person Planning Commission with appeals of decisions and requests for exemptions going before the three person Board of Adjustment. There is also a Code Enforcement Officer for the town.

== Public safety ==
The Ellendale Police Department is a small police force led by Chief Bruce Von Goerres that is responsible for policing in the town limits.

The Ellendale Fire Co. is a forty plus member volunteer fire, rescue, and EMS agency led by Fire Chief Andy Hamilton. The fire company is the primary provider of these services to the town of Ellendale and the surrounding areas with a local district of approximately 60 square miles (160 km^{2}).

=== Crime ===
Ellendale is one of the safest municipalities in the state of Delaware based on the Federal Bureau of Investigation's 2014 Uniform Crime Reports, with only four total crimes reported in the town, the fewest of any of the 35 Delaware municipalities reporting to the FBI.

Ellendale
- Crime rates* (2014)

Violent crimes
- Homicide: 0
- Rape: 0
- Robbery: 0
- Aggravated assault: 0
- Total violent crime: 0

Property crimes
- Burglary: 0
- Larceny-theft: 2
- Motor vehicle theft: 0
- Arson: 0
- Total property crime: 2
- Note: Reported crimes per 100,000 population Source: 2015 FBI UCR Data

== Economy ==
Ellendale, like many towns established in the mid-19th century, had a railroad based economy. Ellendale was centered around a junction of two rail lines. The north–south rail line is still in operation today as a freight line, operated by Delmarva Central Railroad and known as the Indian River Subdivision, although passenger operations have ceased. This secondary is designated as the area running from Harrington, Delaware south to the NRG Energy power plant. The main freight hauled on the track is coal for the NRG power plant located near Millsboro, Delaware. Other freight includes a mix of fertilizer, grain, paper, food products, chemicals, and stone. The Delmarva Central Railroad also operates another rail line in Ellendale, the Milton Branch of the former Queen Anne's Railroad, which leaves the Indian River Subdivision at Willow Street and heads east to Milton, Delaware. This line, called the Milton Industrial Track, is 6.8 miles (10.9 km) from interchange to endpoint, and is currently used to store covered hoppers for Perdue and for other railcar owners. Plans are currently underway for this line to reopen with more operations to a propane tank farm being constructed in Milton.

The largest employer in Ellendale is the Ellendale Recovery Response Center, a health facility for adults with mental health or substance abuse issues. This facility is operated in the former Ellendale public school and took the place of the Kent/Sussex Detoxification Center formerly operated by the Delaware Department of Health and Social Services. Other businesses include a machine shop, a nonprofit mental health medical facility, Philadelphia Bible College, and Perdue Farms research laboratory.

== Infrastructure ==
=== Transportation ===
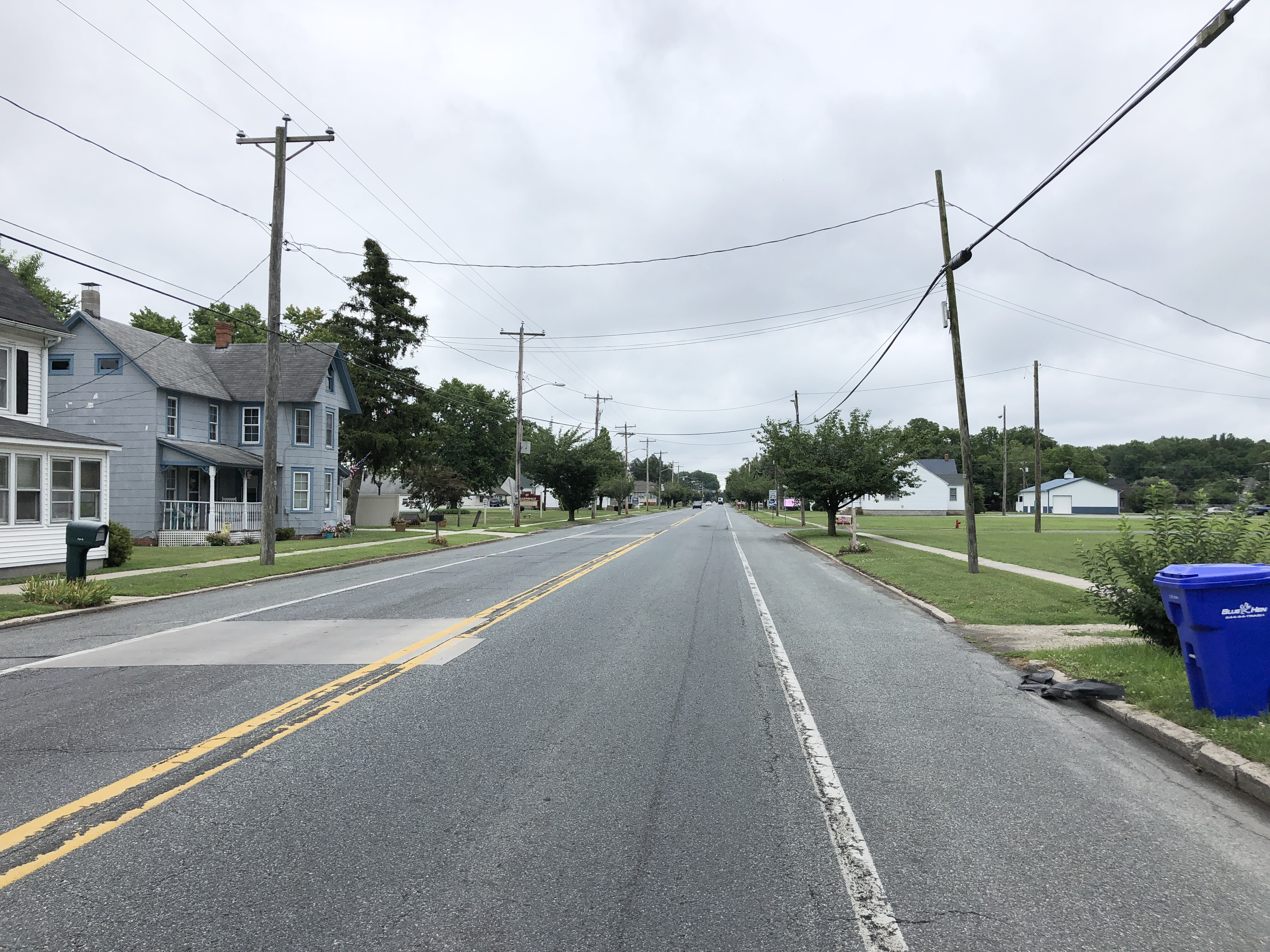
DE 16 through Ellendale

Delaware Route 16 directly serves Ellendale, running east–west through the town, where it is named Main Street. Also known as Beach Highway, DE 16 is a main thoroughfare to Delaware's resort beaches, connecting Ellendale with Milton to the east and Greenwood to the west. U.S. Route 113 runs north-south and crosses western Ellendale, connecting the town with Milford to the north and Georgetown to the south. Also known as DuPont Boulevard, US 113's opening allowed greater access to the town. An anonymous writer in the now extinct Sunday Star newspaper wrote of the Ellendale area "...formerly one of the worst spots in the State for the traveler, where during the winter months, horses and men and automobiles became so deeply mired that they were continually having to be rescued." The writer went on to express that the area had become one of the most beautiful spots on the East Coast of the United States that was compared by tourists to part of Yellowstone National Park.

DART First State serves Ellendale on the inter-county Route 303, which links it to Dover and Georgetown. The Route 303 connects with DART's Kent County bus routes and the inter-county Route 301 to Wilmington and Route 302 to Newark in Dover and DART's Sussex County bus routes in Georgetown with connections to Laurel, Millsboro, and Rehoboth Beach.

=== Utilities ===
Delmarva Power, a subsidiary of Exelon, provides electricity to Ellendale. Chesapeake Utilities provides natural gas to the town. Water in the oldest section of Ellendale is provided by individual wells, newer developments receives water from Artesian Water Company, a subsidiary of Artesian Resources, or Sussex County through the Ellendale Water District. Sussex County operates the Ellendale Sanitary Sewer District, which provides sewer service to the town. Trash and recycling collection in Ellendale is provided by private haulers. A 2021 agreement signed between the Town of Ellendale and Sussex County requires any new development wishing to be built in Ellendale to provide water and sewer services through Sussex County, while also providing that any development that requests water and/or sewer services from Sussex County in the Ellendale area is required to annex into the town's municipal limits.

== Education ==
Ellendale is in the Milford School District.

== Places of interest ==
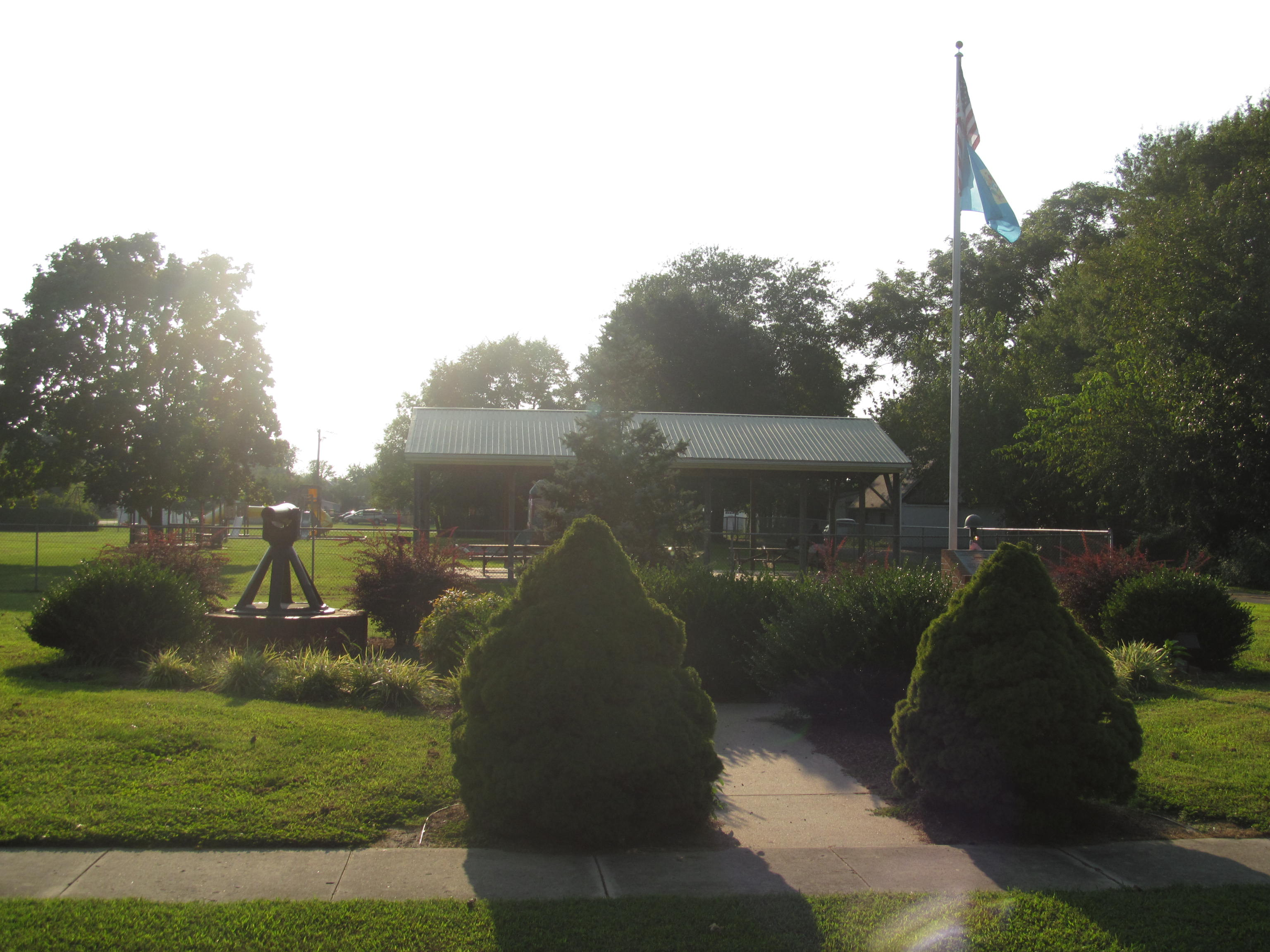
The Ellendale War Memorial is a site dedicated to the citizens of Ellendale killed in various wars. It is located next to the Town Hall and Town Park.

The town of Ellendale has several places of interest to visitors.

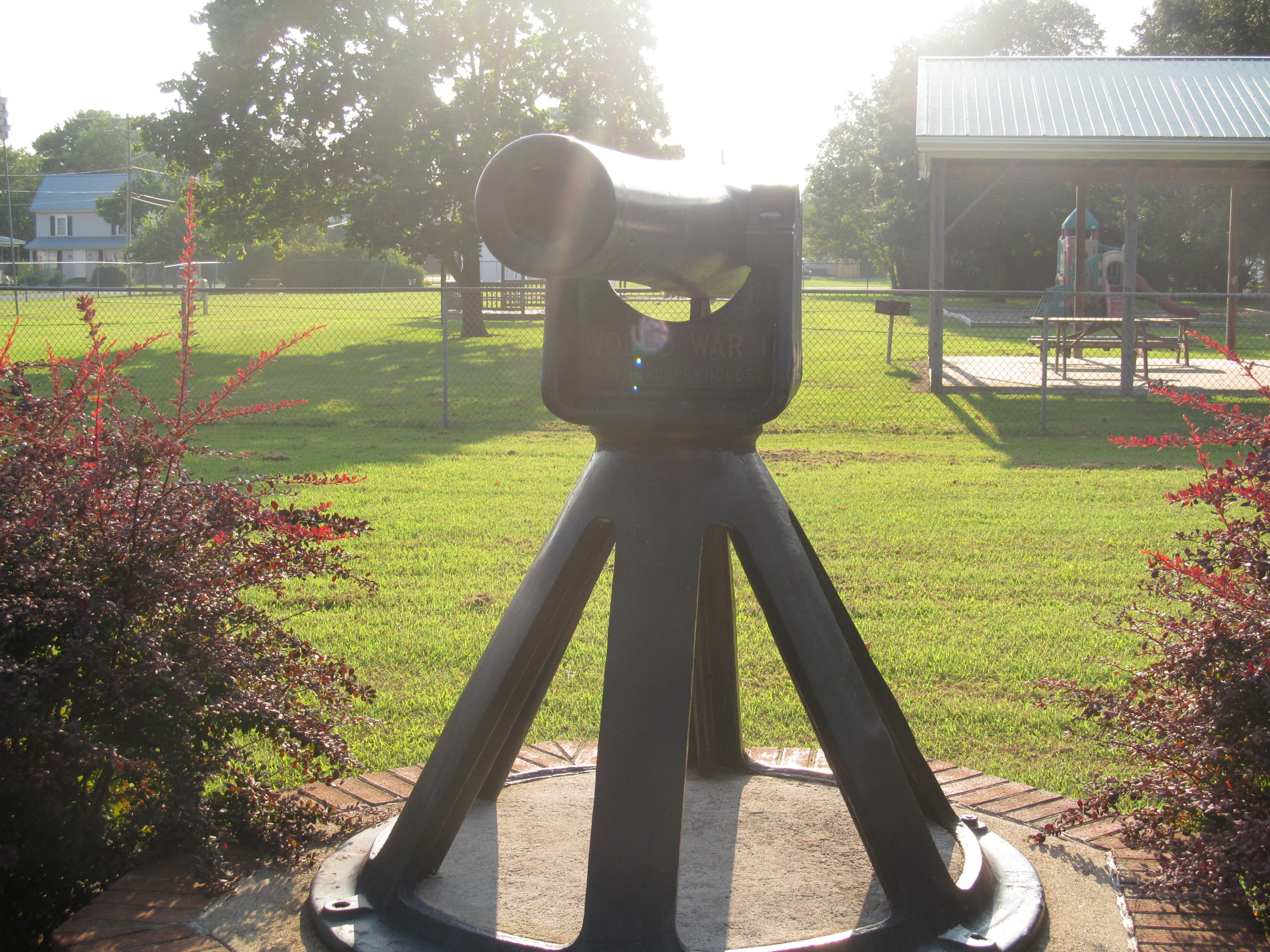
The Ellendale War Memorial cannon is dedicated to one of the fallen citizens of Ellendale from World War II.

The Ellendale State Forest Picnic Facility located on DuPont Boulevard 0.5 miles (0.8 km) south of Main Street in Ellendale is on the National Register of Historic Places and is the last of its kind left in existence. Built in 1936 by the Civilian Conservation Corps, a work relief program for young men established in March 1933 during President Franklin D. Roosevelt's first hundred days in office, part of the New Deal. The Ellendale State Forest was recently merged with the Redden State Forest to create the largest state forest in Delaware. This state forest includes 44 miles (71 km) of trails frequently used for hiking, horseback riding, bicycling, and bird watching. The large forests are also used every year for deer and small game hunting. The Headquarters Tract on East Redden Road includes a limited number of primitive camping sites, a catch-and-release fishing pond, and a natural resource education facility, formerly a historic carriage house, which opened in 2000, and the historic Redden Lodge, renovated in 1996, which is open to the public for camping at a small charge. The Redden/Ellendale Forest Legacy Area is one of four legacy areas in the State of Delaware. Approved in 1998, it is one of the areas with the highest concentration of forests in the state. The forests have their share of ghost tales as well. Tales include that of a headless figure that has been seen walking along the highway, US 113, that runs through the park between Ellendale and Georgetown. No one knows who the ghost is, but there is high rate of accidents reported along this road by the police. When driving along this stretch of US 113, you may notice the traffic fatality signs posted where numerous people have been killed by drunk drivers. It is also reported that in a deserted section of the forest lies a ranger's house that is supposedly haunted by a woman who died within the house.

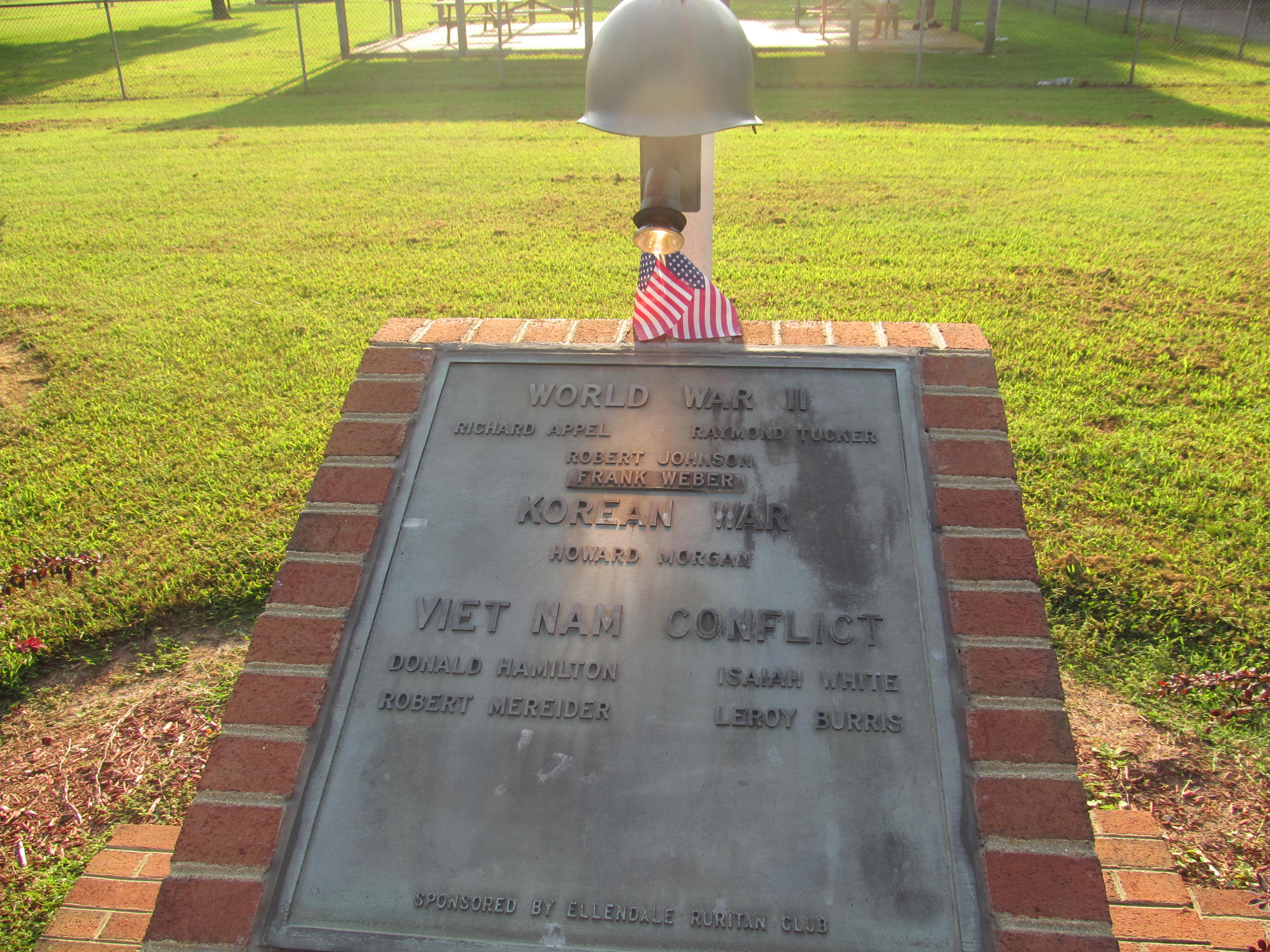
The Ellendale War Memorial plaque listing the names of the fallen Ellendale residents from World War II, the Korean War, and the Viet Nam Conflict.

The War Memorial for soldiers from Ellendale killed in the line of duty in the armed forces is located on McCaulley Avenue between Short's Alley and Willow Street next to the Town Hall/Police Department and Town Park and one block from the Ellendale Town Square located at Main Street and McCaulley Avenue.

There are several historical markers in Ellendale. The Cedar Creek Hundred Historical Marker and Georgetown Hundred Historic Markers are located on DuPont Boulevard across from the Ellendale State Forest. The Ellendale Railroad Square Historical Marker is located at Main Street and East Railroad Avenue. The Ellendale Town Historic Marker unveiled during the towns 100th Anniversary festivities is located at the Town Square at Main Street and McCaulley Avenue.
