= 1780 Black Camp Rebellion =

Uprising of the American Revolutionary War

The 1780 Black Camp Rebellion was a brief Loyalist uprising in Sussex County, Delaware, that occurred during the American Revolutionary War. It was a local reaction to the American War of Independence by Loyalists (called Tories by their opponents) who opposed the independence movement and intended to secure Sussex County for the British.

The insurrection lasted from July 15 to about August 10, 1780, when pro-American militia forces were sent in to round up and arrest the participants. The insurrectionists were mainly from Cedar Creek and Broadkill Hundreds, and their headquarters were in a swamp about six miles north of Georgetown (an area later settled as Ellendale, Delaware), which was in what had been disputed wilderness territory between Delaware and Maryland.

== Participants ==
Most of the insurrectionists were poor farmers in the county who were frustrated over the situation that the war had left them in. The leaders of the insurrection were Bartholomew Banynum (Barnum) of Broadkill Hundred and William Dutton of Cedar Creek Hundred.

== Causes ==
The citizens of Sussex County were far away from the centers of colonial rebellion and protests in Boston, Philadelphia and New York and had no significant objections to how they were ruled by the British government. When the Revolutionary War started, many of the citizens were resentful in finding their lives and livelihoods disrupted by the war.

While Sussex County farmers (as did farmers throughout the colonies) suffered throughout the war from the shutdown of their markets in Philadelphia and Baltimore and occasional seizure of their products by both the American and British militia, their situation was exacerbated in 1780 by a summer drought that destroyed most of the summer wheat harvest. Already resentful of the tax burden imposed on them by the war, many of them were destitute and unable to pay those taxes in 1780. But the trigger for the insurrection seemed to be the British capture of Charleston, South Carolina, in May 1780.

== Chronology ==
Around July 15, a number of men from Broadkill Hundred came together to discuss their hardships and frustrations over the war and what they might do about it. With recent knowledge of the British capture of Charleston, it was rumored and believed that most of the southern colonies from Maryland to Georgia were about to be secured by the British. The group began discussing the possibility of securing Sussex County for the British as well, which would earn them favor by the British. Deciding to move ahead with that plan, the group chose Bartholomew Barnum, a local small planter as their captain, and began training. A similar group formed at about the same time in Cedar Creek Hundred. They chose a full roster of officers to lead their militia: William Dutton as captain; William Ratcliffe as the first lieutenant; Job Townsend as second lieutenant; and Sengo Potter to serve as the company clerk.

The two groups joined in the training and planning while quietly recruiting other local loyalists. The loyalists set up "camps" in the western portion of Cedar Creek Hundred along the drainage divide of the peninsula, where little settlement had yet taken place, and Banynum and Dutton organized the men into "associations" (militia companies). The largest camp was in the Black Swamp about six miles north of Georgetown (near where Ellendale is located today). In early August, they took their campaign public. About 100 men were assembled and sent across the countryside, identifying themselves as "Tories" and seizing all arms and ammunition of families who showed sympathy to the Revolution. Their campaign quickly attracted somewhere between 400 and 500 people who joined them in the loyalist camps.

Despite the "training", the loyalists were quite disorganized and knew almost nothing of military strategy or tactics, causing mayhem in the camps. They apparently did not reach out to the British. By August 7, the Delaware government became aware of the insurrection and moved to suppress them. A pro-American militia, led by the Revolutionary War General John Dagworthy, were sent down from Kent County to disperse the group. Dagworthy's militia spent three days chasing the insurrectionists between their various camps until they were effectively dispersed. Some two hundred insurrectionists were detained by Dagworthy's forces and were brought before an ad hoc military tribunal.

Heavy fines up to £10,000 were levied on most of the defendants, although some consideration was given to the general poverty of the defendants (for instance, tenant farmers William Deputy, Solomon Veach, and John Workman were only assessed £1). Some were ordered to serve in the Continental Army, and 37 were indicted for treason and sentenced to death. However, no death sentences were actually carried out, and the Delaware General Assembly pardoned all of the participants on November 4, 1780. Nonetheless, many of the participants were stigmatized by their neighbors for months afterwards and suffered ongoing indignities in the hopes of encouraging them to move out of the area. Despite this rough treatment, the bulk of the loyalists remained in the county even after hostilities ended. In 1790 the General Assembly removed the requirement that voters had to take an oath of allegiance, and the loyalists in general became supporters of the Federalist Party while those who supported the war became supporters of the Democratic-Republican Party in the early 1790s.
