= Gebhart v. Belton =

United States Supreme Court case

Gebhart v. Belton, 33 Del. Ch. 144, 87 A.2d 862 (Del. Ch. 1952), aff'd, 91 A.2d 137 (Del. 1952), was a case decided by the Delaware Court of Chancery in 1952 and affirmed by the Delaware Supreme Court in the same year. Gebhart was one of the five cases combined into Brown v. Board of Education, the 1954 decision of the United States Supreme Court which found unconstitutional racial segregation in United States public schools.

Gebhart is unique among the five Brown cases in that the state trial court ordered that black children be admitted to the state's segregated whites-only schools, and the state Supreme Court affirmed the trial court's decision. In the remaining Brown cases, all of which were filed in federal rather than state court, federal district courts all found continued segregation constitutional, though some judges questioned its effects on black students, and instead ordered some lesser remedy.

Educational segregation in the US prior to Brown

== Background ==
The unusual status of Gebhart arose in large part because of Delaware's unique legal and historical position. At the time of the litigation, Delaware was one of 17 states with a segregated school system. Delaware is considered a Southern state by the US Census Bureau yet was a border state that remained part of the Union during the Civil War. It nonetheless was both de facto and de jure segregated; Jim Crow laws persisted in the state well into the 1960s, and its educational system was segregated by operation of law. In fact, Delaware's segregation was written into the state constitution, which, while providing at Article X, Section 2, that "no distinction shall be made on account of race or color", nonetheless required that "separate schools for white and colored children shall be maintained." Furthermore, a 1935 state education law required:

The schools provided shall be of two kinds; those for white children and those for colored children. The schools for white children shall be free for all white children between the ages of six and twenty-one years, inclusive; and the schools for colored children shall be free to all colored children between the ages of six and twenty-one years, inclusive. ... The State Board of Education shall establish schools for children of people called Moors or Indians.

Despite this optimistic language, black schools in Delaware were generally decrepit, with poor facilities, substandard curricula, and shoddy construction. Without substantial financial support provided by Wilmington's Du Pont family of chemical fame, segregated schools would likely have been in even worse shape.

At the same time, as a remnant of its days as one of the original thirteen former British colonies, Delaware had developed a judicial system which included a separate Court of Chancery, hearing matters arising in equity rather than in law. As opposed to legal remedies, which usually involve awarding money as damages, equity— as expressed in the maxims of equity, "regards as done that which ought to be done." As a result, cases brought in equity generally seek relief which cannot be awarded as a sum of money, but rather "that which ought to be done".

== The disputes ==
Gebhart involved two separate actions which were consolidated for the purposes of trial.

=== Belton v. Gebhart ===
Belton v. Gebhart was brought by Ethel Louise Belton and six other parents of eight black high school students who lived in Claymont, Delaware. Despite the existence of a well-maintained, spacious high school in Claymont, segregation forced the parents to send their children on a public bus to attend the run-down Howard High School in downtown Wilmington. Howard High School was Delaware's sole business and college-preparatory school for black students and served the entire state of Delaware. Related concerns involved class size, teacher qualifications, and curriculum; indeed, Howard students interested in vocational training were required to walk several blocks to a nearby annex to attend classes offered only after the conclusion of the normal school day.

=== Bulah v. Gebhart ===
Bulah v. Gebhart was brought by Sarah Bulah, a resident of the rural town of Hockessin, Delaware. Mrs. Bulah's daughter, Shirley, had been denied admission to the modern, whites-only Hockessin School No. 29, and instead was compelled to attend a one-room "colored" school, Hockessin School No. 107, which, though very near School No. 29, had vastly inferior facilities and construction. Moreover, Shirley Bulah was required to walk to school every day, even though a school bus serving the nearby whites-only school passed by her house every day. Mrs. Bulah had attempted to obtain transportation for Shirley on that bus, but she was told they would never transport a black student.

== The trial ==
Gebhart was filed in 1951 in the Delaware Court of Chancery by lawyers Jack Greenberg and Louis L. Redding under a strategy formulated by Robert L. Carter of the National Association for the Advancement of Colored People.

Redding was the first black attorney in the history of Delaware and had developed a notable civil-rights practice in his years before the bar. Frequently, he would be sought out by families unable to afford his services, offering his assistance anyway. Over the years, Redding had developed a reputation as a skilled advocate for racial equality, most notably in Parker v. University of Delaware, 75 A.2d 225 (Del. Ch. 1950), which resulted in a ruling from the Court of Chancery that segregation at the University of Delaware was unconstitutional. The prospect of Southern-style segregation being adjudicated by a court of equity which had previously expressed an opinion prohibiting racial segregation was clearly attractive to Greenberg and Redding.

Presiding over the Gebhart trial was Chancellor Collins J. Seitz, who had issued the Parker opinion the prior year. In 1946, at the age of 35, Seitz had been appointed to the Court of Chancery, making him the youngest judge in the history of Delaware. Just prior to the Gebhart litigation, Seitz had given a graduation speech at a local Catholic boys' high school, in which he discussed the courage that would be required to address "a subject that was one of Delaware's great taboos -- the subjugated state of its Negroes. How can we say that we deeply revere the principles of our Declaration [of Independence] and our Constitution and yet refuse to recognize these principles when they are applied to the American Negro in a down-to-earth fashion?"

The plaintiffs presented evidence throughout the course of the trial demonstrating the patently inferior conditions of the Wilmington and Hockessin schools, consisting of testimony and documentary evidence of the schools' infrastructures. In addition, the plaintiffs offered expert testimony from psychologists, psychiatrists, anthropologists, and sociologists—none of which was rebutted by the defense—demonstrating that the inadequate educational facilities and curricula found in segregated schools were harmful to the mental health of black children.

Dramatically illustrating the disparate conditions in the schools were fire insurance valuations prepared by the State of Delaware in 1941, which featured photographs of all Delaware public schools as well as their assessed value. For example, the "colored" school in Hockessin was valued at only $6,250.00, while the whites-only Hockessin school was valued almost seven times higher. The most powerful evidence, however, probably came from the plaintiffs themselves, who described the conditions in their segregated schools and the hardship they were forced to endure to attend those schools in lieu of the much nicer, and more convenient, whites-only schools.

In summary, the plaintiffs argued that:

- Segregated schools violated the Fourteenth Amendment of the United States Constitution, in that they did not offer black children equal protection of the law; but, if not, then:
- The separate facilities and educational opportunities offered to black children were not equal to those furnished to white children similarly situated.

== The decision ==
Initially, Chancellor Seitz noted that the separate but equal law had already been adopted by the United States Supreme Court in Plessy v. Ferguson and that he did not feel able, as a judge of an inferior court, to "reject a principle of United States constitutional law which has been adopted by fair implication by the highest court of the land." For this reason, the Court refused to find that the segregated schools violated the Fourteenth Amendment, but not by any means on the merits of the system; as the Court observed, "I believe the 'separate but equal' doctrine in education should be rejected, but I also believe its rejection must come from [the U.S. Supreme] [C]ourt."

That, however, did not end the Court's analysis. The Court found that the separate "colored" facilities were in no way equal to the whites-only facilities, and, exercising the broad powers of a court of equity, ordered that black students be immediately integrated.

Chancellor Seitz decried the unequal conditions of the plaintiffs' schools in strong terms:

I now consider whether the facilities of the [Claymont and Howard] institutions are separate but equal, within the requirements of the Fourteenth Amendment to the United States Constitution. Are the separate facilities and educational opportunities offered to these Negro plaintiffs, and those similarly situated, "equal" in the constitutional sense, to those available at Claymont High to white children, similarly situated? The answer to this question is often much more difficult than appears, because many of the factors to be compared are just not susceptible of mathematical evaluation, e. g., aesthetic considerations. Moreover, and of real importance, the United States Supreme Court has not decided what should be done if a Negro school being compared with a white school is inferior in some respects and superior in others. It is easy, as some courts do, to talk about the necessity for finding substantial equality. But, under this approach, how is one to deal with a situation where, as here, the mental and physical health services at the Negro school are superior to those offered at the white school while the teacher load at the Negro school is not only substantially heavier than that at the white school, but often exceeds the State announced educationally desirable maximum teacher-pupil ratio. The answer, it seems to me is this: Where the facilities or educational opportunities available to the Negro are, as to any substantial factor, inferior to those available to white children similarly situated, the constitutional principle of "separate but equal" is violated, even though the State may point to other factors as to which the Negro school is superior. I reach this conclusion because I do not believe a court can say that the substantial factor as to which the Negro school is inferior will not adversely affect the educational progress of at least some of those concerned. Moreover, evaluating unlike factors is unrealistic. If this be a harsh test, then I answer that a State which divides its citizens should pay the price.

With regard to the Hockessin schools at issue in Bulah, the Court noted similar disparities demonstrating a lack of equal treatment:

Another factor connected with these two schools demands separate attention, because it is a consequence of segregation so outlandish that the Attorney General, with commendable candor, has in effect refused to defend it. I refer to the fact that school bus transportation is provided those attending No. 29 who, except for color, are in the same situation as this infant plaintiff. Yet neither school bus transportation, nor its equivalent is provided this plaintiff even to attend No. 107. In fact, the State Board of Education refused to authorize the transportation of this then seven-year-old plaintiff to the Negro school, even though the bus for white children went right past her home, and even though the two schools are no more than a mile apart. Moreover, there is no public transportation available from or near plaintiff's home to or near the Negro school. The State Board ruled that because of the State constitutional provision for separate schools, a Negro child may not ride in a bus serving a white school. If we assume that this is so, then this practice in and of itself, is another reason why the facilities offered this plaintiff at No. 107 are inferior to those provided at No. 29. To suggest, under the facts here presented, that there are not enough Negroes to warrant the cost of a school bus for them is only another way of saying that they are not entitled to equal services because they are Negroes. Such an excuse will not do here. I conclude that the facilities and educational opportunities at No. 107 are substantially inferior in a constitutional sense, to those at No. 29. For the reasons stated in connection with Claymont I do not believe the relief should merely be an order to make equal. An injunction will issue preventing the defendants and their agents from refusing these plaintiffs, and those similarly situated, admission to School No. 29 because of their color.

On August 28, 1952, the Supreme Court of Delaware unanimously affirmed the Chancery Court's ruling. Despite this, the two schools of Hockessin Elementary and Claymont High School did not integrate in 1952 because the State Board of Education did not give these schools an official mandate to do so. The Claymont High Board of Education met on September 3, 1952, and decided they would enroll the black students even without a mandate. At the last minute the State Board of Education called and gave a verbal mandate for the children to attend. On the morning of September 4, 1952, eleven black students got on their bus and came to Claymont High School and there were no incidents. The next day, Delaware Attorney Young called and told Claymont Superintendent Stahl to "send the children home" because the cases were being appealed and eventually became part of the Brown v. Board case. Superintendent Stahl and the School Board refused to send the children home, because they wanted the school to be integrated and had worked hard to have integration occur through the court systems. Even the high school teachers signed a letter stating that they wanted the students to remain. Claymont administrators were willing to defy the state. After many meetings, the State School Board agreed to allow the students remain in Claymont, Hockessin and Arden. Arden had an elementary school which fed into the Claymont High School. Recently moved into Ardencroft was a family that had three students which were now attending Claymont High School and three children that were elementary school aged. Arden had voted to allow these younger children to attend their school. The State Board of Education decided to allow these children to remain in Arden.

The State Board of Education declared that no other public schools in Delaware were permitted to integrate until after the Brown v. Board decision was decided.

== The aftermath ==
The State Attorney General appealed Chancellor Seitz' decision in Gebhart to the Delaware Supreme Court. The plaintiffs, believing the Court of Chancery had not gone far enough in overturning the concept of "separate but equal", cross-appealed. The Supreme Court affirmed the decision in a relatively short opinion, relying on Plessy to reject arguments that segregation per se was unconstitutional, while ordering integration and leaving open the possibility of resegregation in the future. From there, the school-district defendants appealed to the United States Supreme Court, where the consolidation with Brown occurred.

Telegram from Louis L. Redding to Governor J. Caleb Boggs requesting assistance to integrate Milford High School in 1954

The Supreme Court's decision in Brown affirmed the Supreme Court of Delaware's order to allow black students to enroll in previously all-white schools. This was the only case the Supreme Court affirmed in part. The Supreme Court then reversed the Delaware Supreme Court on the constitutional issues and remanded the cases for further proceedings. After the Brown ruling, a sea change occurred in American and Delaware politics and society. The result of this ruling was that Delaware became fully integrated, albeit with time and much effort. The state Department of Public Instruction agreed to integrate all Delaware schools in light of the Supreme Court's order. In Northern and Central Delaware, most were willing to accept the Brown ruling, but there was much opposition from white residents in the southern portion of the state.

The white supremacist Bryant Bowles raised $6,000 and founded the National Association for the Advancement of White People (NAAWP) to oppose the ruling. Bowles briefly attracted nationwide attention for leading a pro-segregation boycott of previously all-white Milford High School. On September 27, 1954, as eleven black students were preparing to enroll at the school, unrest from angry townspeople was feared to be imminent. In response, Louis Redding issued an urgent telegram to Delaware Governor J. Caleb Boggs requesting the presence of state police officers "adequate to assure personal safety of eleven children whose admittance to that school last night was confirmed by state board of education." Redding closed his telegram with an optimistic line: "Hope also no occasion for powers of the police will arise." A mass meeting in Milford held in October of that year attracted a crowd of 3,000 people. Bowles encouraged a boycott to protest the integration of Delaware schools. Only 456 out of 1562 Milford High School students attended the next day, and the movement gained traction in the nearby town of Lincoln, where 116 of the 146 pupils in the local elementary school boycotted in solidarity. Mass protests continued in Milford; the school board eventually ceded to the protestors, expelling the black students. Several weeks later, Bowles was arrested for "conspiring to violate the state education law by leading a boycott at Milford’s integrated high school". The Attorney General later took action to revoke the NAAWP's corporate charter in September 1955. However, the ensuing unrest, which included cross burnings, rallies, and pro-segregation demonstrations, contributed to desegregation in most of Southern Delaware being delayed for another ten years. School segregation in the state would not end until 1967.

Some argue that while the state of race relations was dramatically improving post-Brown, any progress was destroyed in the wake of the rioting that broke out in Wilmington in April 1968 in the wake of the assassination of Dr. Martin Luther King Jr. in Memphis. Delaware's response to the Wilmington riots was heavy-handed in the opinion of some, involving the virtual occupation of the city for over one year by the Delaware National Guard.

For his efforts in defeating segregation, Louis Redding was honored with a life-size bronze statue of him embracing a young black schoolboy and a young white schoolgirl outside the City-County government complex in downtown Wilmington, which is also named for him. Redding was also honored by the naming of Louis Redding Middle School in Middletown, New Castle County.
