= Shirley Bulah Stamps =

American nurse

The Reverend Shirley Stamps
- Born: January 30, 1944
- Died: May 28, 2003 (aged 59)
- Citizenship: American
- Occupation: Nurse

Shirley Barbara Bulah Stamps (30 January 1944 - 28 May 2003) was an American army nurse and minister whose family won a desegregation case in Wilmington, Delaware over school segregation.

== Early life ==
Shirley was adopted by Fred and Sarah Bulah after Sarah Bulah read in the Wilmington newspapers in 1945 about an abandoned 10-month-old baby.

== Bulah v. Gebhart ==
Shirley was denied busing as a child and prohibited from attending the segregated school for white students in her area.

Fred had to drive her two miles to a school for blacks in a Wilmington suburb while the school bus passed by her house each day on its way to the segregated school for white students.

In 1951, the Bulah family, contacted attorney Louis L. Redding, via NAACP, for legal support when her appeals to the state school officials were rejected due to segregation. . They sued for Shirley's admission to white Hockessin School No. 29, citing state segregation.

Sarah Bulah faced scorn for her decision to pursue a legal challenge. Her neighbors opposed it, local Black teachers disapproved, and her pastor questioned its wisdom, later admitting, « I was for segregation ».

Bulah v. Gebhart was joined with Gebhart v. Belton in the Delaware Court of Chancery in 1952. Chancellor Collins J. Seitz presided over the case and ruled that the racial segregation of Delaware's public schools was unconstitutional. The case was one of several that led to the U.S. Supreme Court's landmark decision in Brown v. Board of Education in 1954.

== Personal life ==
After high school, Shirley Bulah Stamps served as a military nurse, where she met and married Phillip E. Stamps. They had a son Phillip Jr. as well as three grandchildren.

Phillip E. Stamps died in 1996. She then returned from Maryland to Delaware where she had been ordained as a minister in 1984. She pastored four churches, including St. James African Union Methodist Church in Wilmington.

Shirley died of a heart attack on May 28, 2003, at age 59.

The National Park Service published an August 16, 2001, video interview of her discussing her desegregation experiences.

== See also ==
- Brown v Board of Education
- Gebhart v. Belton
