= Ellendale State Forest Picnic Facility =

- U.S. National Register of Historic Places
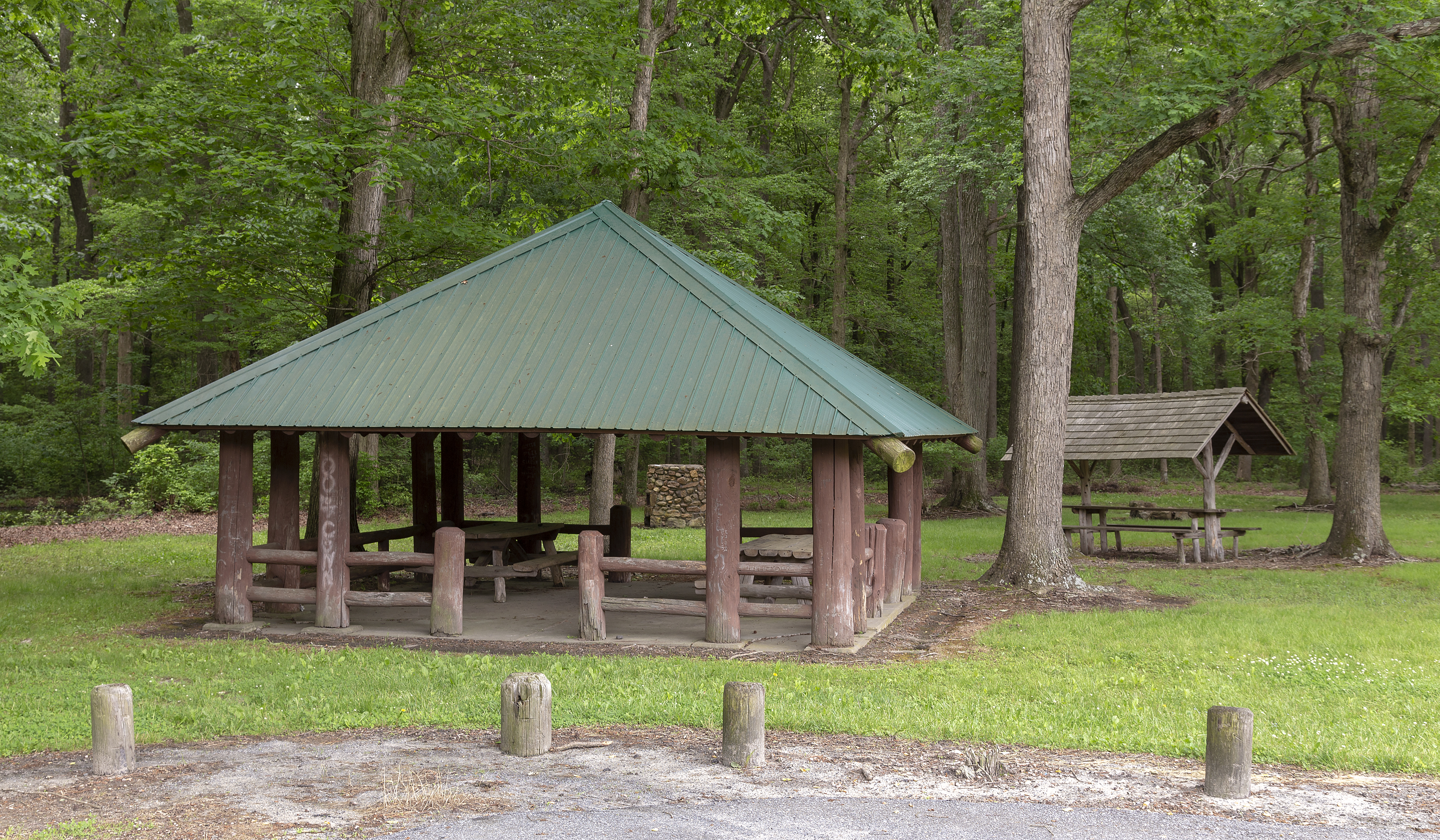
- Ellendale Picnic Area in 2018

- Location within Delaware Location within the United States
- Location: U.S. Route 113, ½ mile south of Delaware Route 16 in Georgetown Hundred, Ellendale, Delaware
- Coordinates: 38°46′32″N 75°26′15″W
- Area: 1 acre (0.40 ha)
- Built: 1938–1939
- Built by: Delaware State Forester, Civilian Conservation Corps
- Architectural style: Rustic
- NRHP reference No.: 91000913
- Added to NRHP: July 22, 1991

Ellendale State Forest Picnic Facility, also known as CCC Picnic Area/S-8151, is a historic picnic facility located at Ellendale, Sussex County, Delaware. It was built in 1938-1939 by the Civilian Conservation Corps and designed to serve as a road-side rest facility for tourists and long-distance travelers on the DuPont Boulevard. It consists of three buildings and three structures. The largest of these is a 20 feet, 10 inch, square pyramidal-roofed log pavilion. Also on the property are two wood gable-roofed picnic tables shelters, a fieldstone trash pit, fieldstone fireplace hearth, and foundation and water pipe for a fountain.

It was added to the National Register of Historic Places in 1991.
