= Federalsburg, Delaware =

Unincorporated community in Delaware, United States

- Unincorporated community
- Location within Delaware Location within the United States
- Coordinates: 38°49′41″N 75°25′46″W
- Country: United States
- State: Delaware
- County: Sussex
- Elevation: 49 ft (15 m)
- Time zone: UTC-5 (Eastern (EST))
  - Summer (DST): UTC-4 (EDT)
- Area code: 302
- GNIS feature ID: 216748

Federalsburg (also known as Fleatown) is an unincorporated community in Sussex County, Delaware, United States. Federalsburg was located at the intersection of Old State Road and Fleatown Road, north of Ellendale.

== History ==
The area was originally known as Fleatown and was the location of the historic Fleatown Inn from circa 1740 until it was torn down in April, 1895. The community housed two taverns on the Old State Road that served stagecoaches and travelers on the road from Milford to Georgetown, but the taverns closed and the community faded after the Junction and Breakwater Railroad depot was built in Ellendale in 1866.
