= Teddy's Tavern =

- U.S. National Register of Historic Places
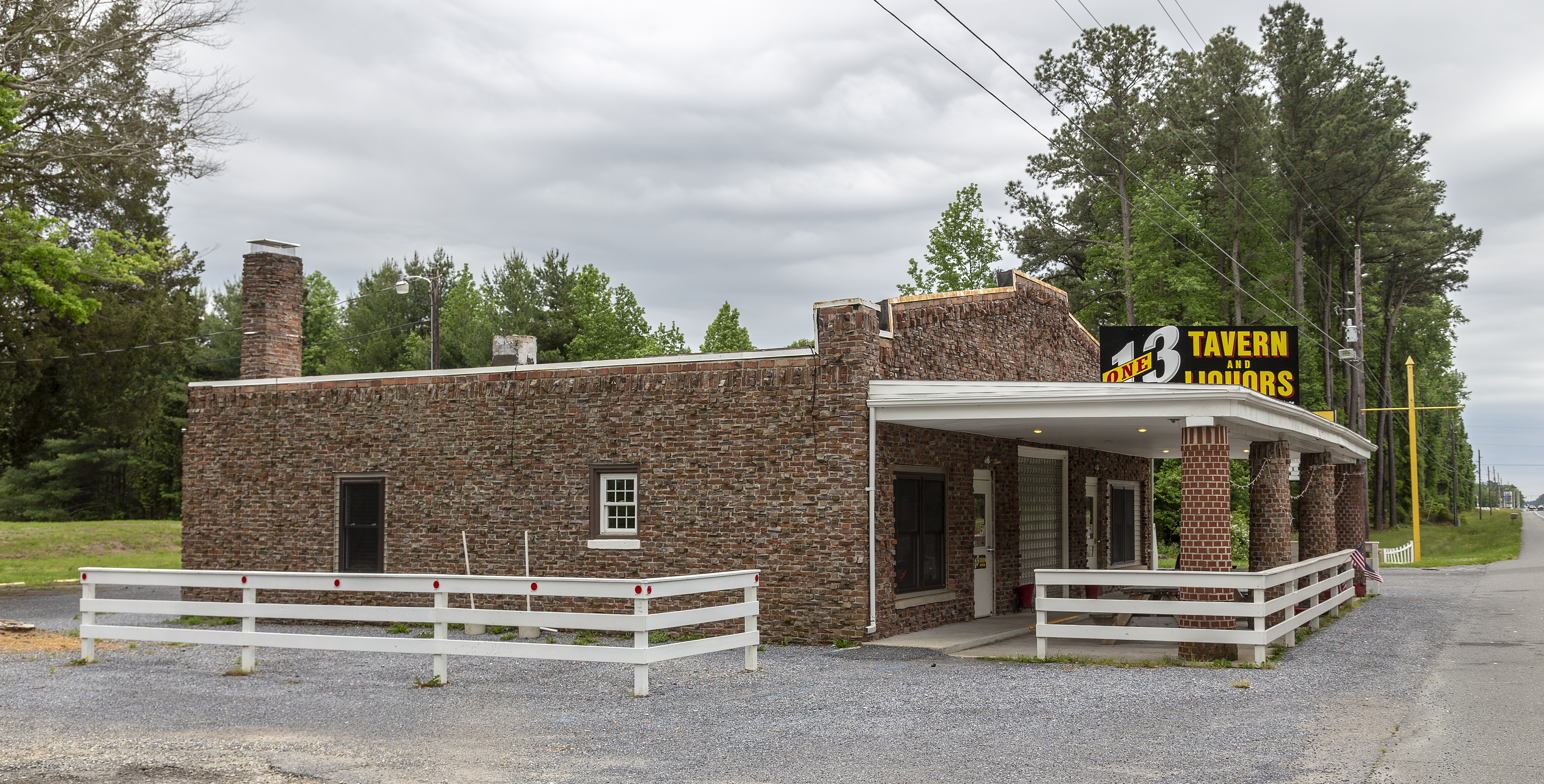
- As One 13 Tavern and Liquors in 2018

- Location within Delaware Location within the United States
- Location: Eastern side of U.S. Route 113 (Du Pont Boulevard), 0.6 miles north of its junction with Delaware Route 16 in Cedar Creek Hundred, Ellendale, Delaware
- Coordinates: 38°48′53″N 75°26′19″W
- Area: 1.5 acres (0.61 ha)
- Built: 1923, 1937
- Architectural style: Mission/spanish Revival
- NRHP reference No.: 91000911
- Added to NRHP: July 22, 1991

Teddy's Tavern, originally called the Blue Hen Garage, is a historic tavern located at Ellendale, Sussex County, Delaware, USA. It was built about 1923, as a service station catering to motorists on the newly constructed Du Pont Highway. It was converted into a roadside tavern in 1937. It is a one-story, polychrome brick building with a low-pitched gable roof, low parapet, and exposed rafter ends in a Mission/Spanish Revival style. It has a flat-roofed "porch" supported by four massive brick and concrete conical columns. The interior consists of a package store, dining areas and a labyrinth of service rooms. It is one of the few surviving service stations or roadside taverns remaining from the pre-1940 era in Delaware.

It was added to the National Register of Historic Places in 1991.
