= Ruby Puryear Hearn =

American biophysicist (born 1940)

Ruby P. Hearn, Ph.D.
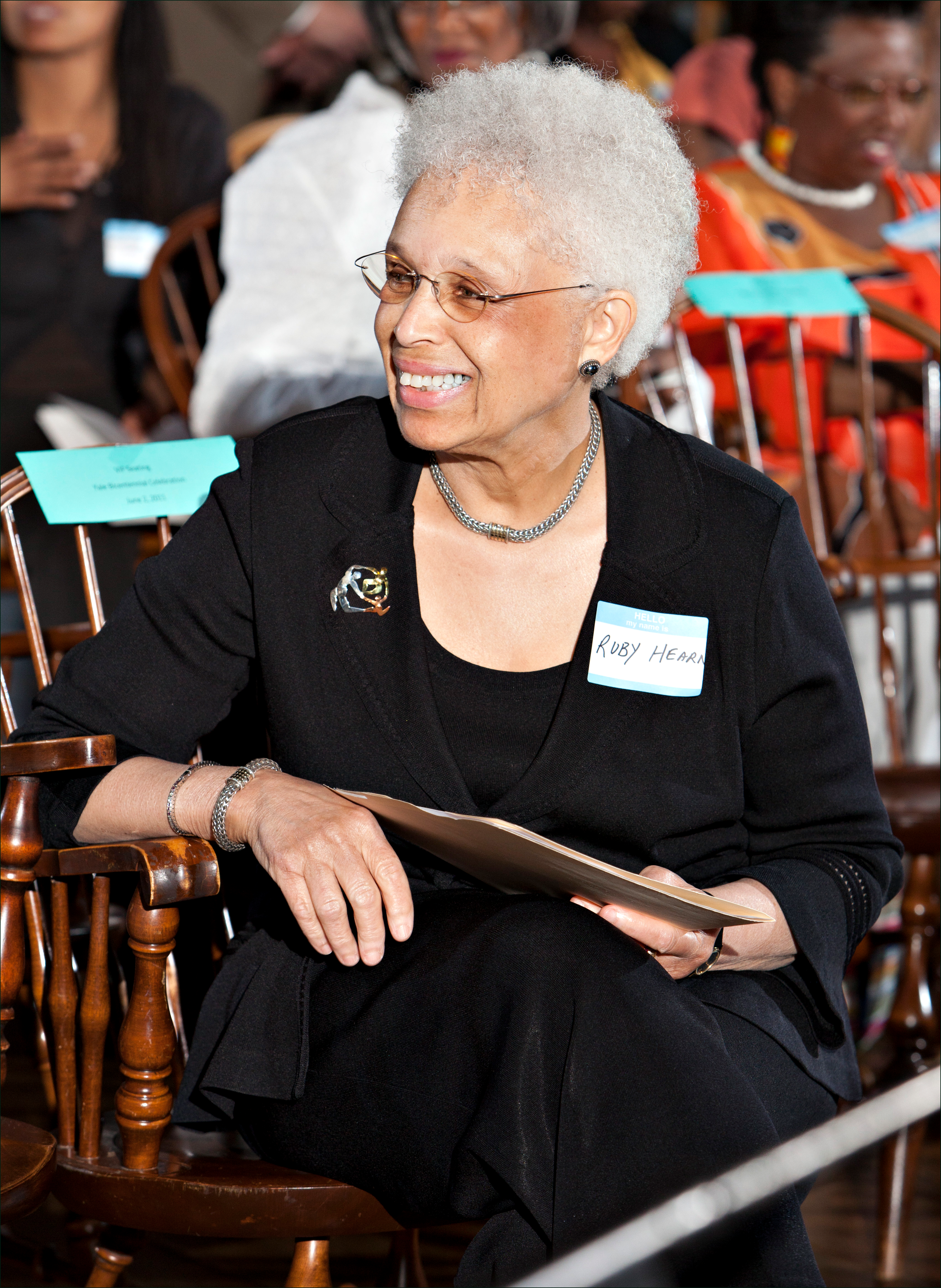
- Hearn in 2011
- Born: April 13, 1940 (age 86); Winston-Salem, North Carolina
- Education: Skidmore College; Yale University
- Spouse: Robert Hearn (m. 1960)
- Children: 2
- Scientific career
- Fields: Biophysics
- Thesis: Thermodynamic Parameters in the Ribonuclease-S System (1969)

Ruby Louise Puryear Hearn (born April 13, 1940) is an American biophysicist who has dedicated her career to health policy. Her work spans initiatives in maternal, infant, and child health; AIDS; substance abuse; and minority medical education.

== Early life ==
Ruby Louise Puryear was born in Winston-Salem, North Carolina on April 13, 1940. Her family later relocated to the Atlanta area. She is African-American.

Ruby attended Skidmore College from 1956 to 1960 majoring in biochemistry. As a senior, she wrote to the editor of the college newspaper, criticizing the National Student Association for not supporting black students' protest of Woolworth's Department Stores. She excelled as a student, regularly appearing on the dean's list and graduating with highest honors in 1960. Ruby was one of twelve students in her class to pursue graduate school.

Ruby married Robert Hearn in December 1960, and has two children.

== Career ==
Hearn attended Yale University, earning a M.S. and Ph.D. in biophysics. Her dissertation was titled "Thermodynamic Parameters In The RNase-S System." She was a Yale Corporation Fellow from 1992 to 1998.

Throughout the 1970s, Hearn worked on development programs to improve the health of at-risk children. In 1980 she began working at Robert Wood Johnson Foundation, the largest healthcare philanthropy in the United States.

Hearn spent the majority of her career at the foundation, where her program planning efforts focused on "maternal, infant, and child health; AIDS; substance abuse; and minority medical education." She also acted as the Foundation's liaison to the non-profit community. From 1983 to 2001, Hearn served as Senior Vice President of the Robert Wood Johnson Foundation. Since retiring, she continues to act as Senior Vice President Emerita.

Hearn has been active on several boards and committees throughout her lifetime. In 1995, she was on the executive committee for the board of directors of the Special Olympics World Summer Games. Hearn has served on the Science Board of the Food and Drug Administration, as well as the governing Council of the Institute of Medicine. She also served on the board on Children, Youth, and Families for the National Academy of Medicine, and on the Committee on Science, Engineering, and Public Policy for the National Academy of Sciences. The New York Academy of Medicine awarded Hearn the Academy Medal for Exceptional Service to the academy in 2015, recognizing "more than a decade of distinguished service on the Academy's Board of Trustees" and acknowledging Hearn's role as "a critical leader and advocate in creating the Academy's development capability."

== Honors & Awards ==
- Honoree, 1998, National Academy of Engineering
- Distinguished Alumni, 2013, Skidmore College
- Academy Medal for Exceptional Service to the academy, 2015, New York Academy of Medicine
