= Cedar Creek Hundred =

- Hundred
- Delaware
- Coordinates: 38.8667792°N 75.2996353°W
- Country: United States
- State: Delaware
- County: Sussex
- Time zone: UTC-5 (Eastern (EST))
  - Summer (DST): UTC-4 (EDT)
- GNIS feature ID: 217205

Cedar Creek Hundred is a "hundred" located in Sussex County, Delaware (USA) that was established in 1702. The counties of Delaware were originally divided into Hundreds based on the English use of dividing up counties. On October 25, 1682, William Penn directed that Delaware be divided into hundreds for the purposes of taxation. A "hundred" is an old English Saxon land division which is smaller than a county or shire and larger than a tithing. It comprised ten tithings of ten freeholder families each – one hundred families. The hundreds of Delaware originally served as judicial or legislative districts, but now they remain only as a basis for property tax assessment.

Originally, there were five hundreds in New Castle County, five in Kent County, and two in Sussex County. As the population grew, several of the hundreds divided, creating new hundreds. By 1875, the total number of hundreds had grown to thirty-three. Since then, there have been no more changes.

Cedar Creek Hundred was originally known as Cedar Hook Hundred. Before 1683, that part of the Hundred lying north of Cedar Creek formed part of St. Jones County, now known as Kent County. When the Mispillion River was made the northern boundary of Sussex County, the northern part of the present Hundred was consolidated with the southern part lying between Cedar Creek and Primehook Creek.
