= National Association for the Advancement of White People (1953–1955) =

Defunct white supremacist organization

The National Association for the Advancement of White People (NAAWP) refers to the defunct organization led by white supremacist Bryant Bowles from 1953 to 1955. While identical in name, it is distinct from the current NAAWP founded in 1979 by David Duke.

While leading the NAAWP, Bowles described himself as "not anti-Negro but just pro-white" and campaigned heavily for segregation.

== History ==
The National Association for the Advancement of White People was created in Delaware in 1953 by Bryant Bowles, the president of the organization. At its formation, the group was led also by vice president B. P. Robertson, secretary E. L. Williford, treasurer P. S. Robertson, and directors Frances E. Robertson, George E. Tacy, J. H. Dickerson, and J. C. Miller.

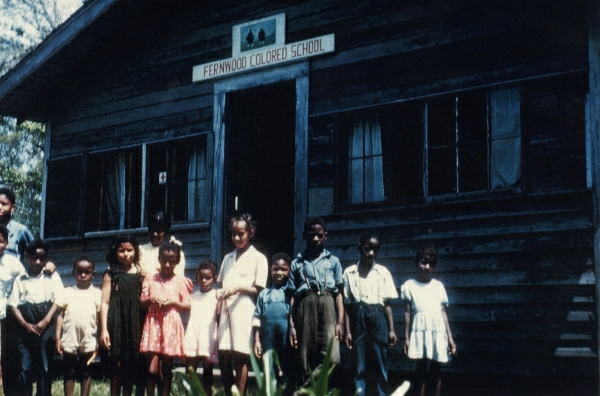
A "colored" school, circa 1946. Bowles aimed to maintain segregation in all aspects of life, vehemently protesting integration of races in schools.

In 1954, Bowles outlined his goals for the group in an interview with the Wilmington Evening Journal, stating the NAAWP's objectives to be:

1. To "publicize to the white people what's going on in this integration business. Most people really don't know."
2. Complete segregation of races. He said there are really only 100,000 Americans.
3. To see public schools run by the public, not by boards or by the Supreme Court.
4. States' rights.
5. The organization is "against legislation by the Supreme Court."

In 2013, the Federal Bureau of Investigation released a dossier written on the original NAAWP, published under the Freedom of Information Act. The dossier contains the organization's original Certificate of Incorporation submitted to the Delaware State Department, on December 14, 1953. This further outlines the NAAWP's goals and concerns with maintaining rights awarded in the Constitution, maintaining current social customs, studying social relationships across different racial groups, and to encourage the existence of racial enclaves. The certificate also outlines the organization's goals to expand nationally.

Bowles and other leaders traveled and attempted to gain support in other areas, mainly within the South. The group briefly published a bimonthly paper, the "National Forum", with headlines such as "SOUTH INDIGNANT AS JEW-LED N.A.A.C.P. WINS SCHOOL SEGREGATION CASES". A mass meeting in Milford, Delaware, in October 1954, attracted a crowd of 3,000 people. Bowles encouraged a boycott to protest the integration of schools, after eleven black students were enrolled in the previously racially segregated school. Only 456 out of 1562 students attended the next day, and the movement gained traction in the nearby town of Lincoln, where 116 of the 146 pupils in the local elementary school boycotted in solidarity. Mass protests continued in Milford; the school board eventually ceded to the protestors, expelling the African American students.

Several weeks later, Bryant Bowles was arrested for "conspiring to violate the state education law by leading a boycott at Milford’s integrated high school". The Attorney General later took action, in September 1955, to revoke the NAAWP's corporate charter.
