= Bryant Bowles =

American white supremacist

- Bowles speaking at a pro-segregation protest (1954)
- Born: Bryant William Bowles Jr. March 20, 1920; Alford, Florida, U.S.
- Died: April 13, 1997 (aged 77); Tampa, Florida, U.S.
- Known for: Founding the National Association for the Advancement of White People
- Convictions: Texas; Murder with malice Florida; Drug trafficking
- Penalty: Texas; Life imprisonment Florida; 30 years imprisonment

Bryant William Bowles Jr. (March 4, 1920 – April 13, 1997) was a white supremacist bitterly opposed to racial integration of public schools in the United States.

Bowles joined the Marine Corps in 1939, was trained as a bugler, and served during World War II and the Korean War as a corporal. He was discharged from active duty in 1951. In May 1954, the U.S. Supreme Court ruled that racially segregated public schools were unconstitutional. Bowles raised $6,000 and founded the National Association for the Advancement of White People to oppose the ruling. That fall, Bowles invited Willis V. McCall, a Florida sheriff notorious for shooting two of the Groveland Four, one of them fatally, to speak at one of his rallies. In 1954, Bowles was charged with beating and kicking a black postman in Washington, D.C., albeit the charges were later dropped.

During the latter half of 1954, Bowles held rallies and gave speeches in several different states. At one such rally Bowles is reported to have said that his daughter "will never attend a school with Negroes as long as there is breath in my body and gunpowder will burn."

Bowles briefly attracted nationwide attention for leading a pro-segregation boycott of Milford High School in Milford, Delaware. The ensuing unrest, which included cross burnings, contributed to desegregation in most of Southern Delaware being delayed for several years. In 1955, he was tried in Dover before Judge Charles Sudler Richards for making inflammatory statements. After brief deliberation, the jury found Bowles not guilty. A 1999 article in Delaware Lawyer states that "many years later it was learned that one of the jurors was a member of Bowles's organization." Nevertheless, Bowles tried to hold more rallies in Maryland and Pennsylvania, he was threatened with criminal charges. Segregationists were wary of his propensity for violence and suspected him of being an opportunist, and his record for fraud and forgery drew attention. Bowles further alienated himself from other segregationists when he attacked Jews, whom he described as "an invisible clique of unscrupulous haters of the white race."

On May 3, 1958, while living near Beaumont, Texas, Bowles fatally shot his brother-in-law, James Earl Harvey, following a family dispute turned violent. Harvey had gotten into an argument with Bowles's pregnant wife, Elma Lois Bowles, whom he slapped. Elma threatened to have her husband kill Harvey, after which he replied that he was ready to fight him, and had wanted to do so for some time. Mrs. Bowles called her husband, who was on a business trip in Chicago, and he returned to Texas the following day, driving 18 hours. After talking with his wife, Bowles took his shotgun and drove with her to Harvey's home. Bowles confronted Harvey on his porch and shot him. Harvey died of his injuries the following day. Bowles and Elma were both arrested and charged with murder. Bowles pleaded self-defense, claiming that Harvey always carried a knife, had tried to grab a gun. However, these arguments were rejected, and he was found guilty of murder with malice. The prosecution sought a death sentence, but the jury instead imposed a life sentence. The conviction was upheld on appeal. Elma was also found guilty of murder, but only received a 5-year suspended sentence.

Bowles was paroled in March 1973. In 1976, he and his brother, John Thomas Bowles, were arrested for their involvement in a marijuana trafficking ring in Florida. The following year, the two were found guilty of smuggling marijuana and each received 5-year sentences. In February 1978, Bowles fled while on work release. In 1980, he was arrested along with another man, after landing a plane loaded with 600 pounds of marijuana and 78,000 Quaaludes. In December 1980, Bowles was sentenced to 25 years in prison on drug trafficking charges. He was paroled in the 1990s. Bowles died in 1997, at age of 77 of congestive heart failure in Tampa. He was buried in Florida National Cemetery in Bushnell, Florida.
