= Newell Branch (Tidbury Creek tributary) =

Stream in Delaware, USA

Newell Branch Tributary to Tidbury Creek
- Location of Newell Branch mouth Newell Branch (Tidbury Creek tributary) (the United States)

Location
- Country: United States
- State: Delaware
- County: Kent

Physical characteristics
- Source: Isaac Branch divide
  - location: Pond about 0.5 miles west of Star Hill, Delaware
  - coordinates: 39°06′03″N 075°33′15″W
  - elevation: 43 ft (13 m)
- Mouth: Tidbury Creek
  - location: Voshell Mill, Delaware
  - coordinates: 39°05′55″N 075°31′41″W
  - elevation: 10 ft (3.0 m)
- Length: 1.57 mi (2.53 km)
- Basin size: 1.63 square miles (4.2 km^{2})
- Discharge
  - location: Tidbury Creek
  - average: 1.98 cu ft/s (0.056 m^{3}/s) at mouth with Tidbury Creek

Basin features
- Progression: Tidbury Creek → St. Jones River → Delaware Bay → Atlantic Ocean
- River system: St. Jones River
- Tributaries
  - left: unnamed tributaries
  - right: unnamed tributaries
- Bridges: Lone Tree Drive, US 13, Peachtree Run, Voshell Mill Road

Newell Branch is a 1.57 mi (2.53 km) long 1st order tributary to Tidbury Creek in Kent County, Delaware.

== Course ==
Newell Branch rises in a pond about 0.5 miles west of Star Hill in Kent County, Delaware on the Isaac Branch divide. Newell Branch then flows easterly to meet Tidbury Creek at Voshell Mill, Delaware.

== Watershed ==
Newell Branch drains 1.63 square miles (4.2 km^{2}) of area, receives about 44.8 in/year of precipitation, has a topographic wetness index of 604.28 and is about 1.2% forested.

== See also ==
- List of Delaware rivers

== Maps ==
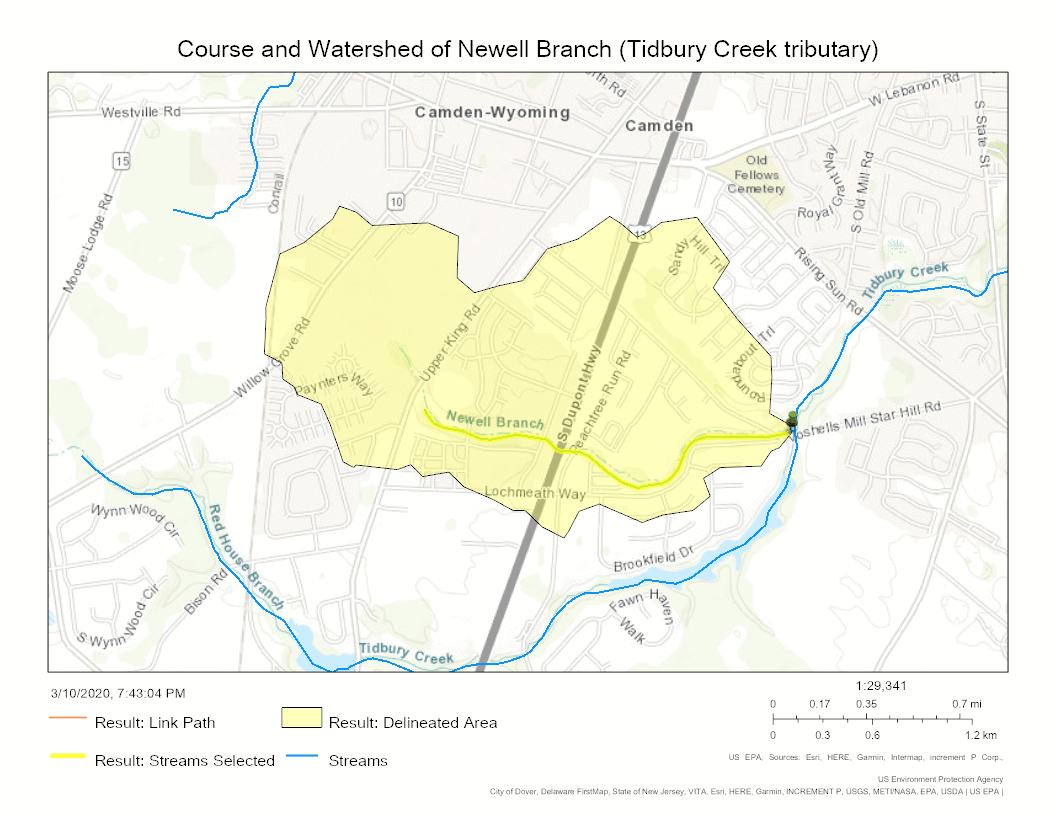
Course and Watershed of Newell Branch (Tidbury Creek tributary)
