= Lewis family =

Lewis family may refer to:

- The Lewis Family - a family of gospel and bluegrass musicians from Lincolnton, Georgia
- Lewis family (Canada) - a Canadian political family associated with the New Democratic Party
- Lewis family of Van, Glamorganshire - a Welsh royal house
- Lewis Family Tenant Agricultural Complex - a historic home and farm located at Wyoming, Kent County, Delaware
