= Red House Branch (Tidbury Creek tributary) =

Stream in Delaware, USA

Red House Branch Tributary to Tidbury Creek
- Location of Red House Branch mouth Red House Branch (Tidbury Creek tributary) (the United States)

Location
- Country: United States
- State: Delaware
- County: Kent

Physical characteristics
- Source: Almshouse Branch divide
  - location: about 0.5 miles northwest of Derby Shores, Delaware
  - coordinates: 39°05′52″N 075°34′44″W
  - elevation: 50 ft (15 m)
- Mouth: Tidbury Creek
  - location: Derby Pond
  - coordinates: 39°05′07″N 075°33′49″W
  - elevation: 30 ft (9.1 m)
- Length: 1.33 mi (2.14 km)
- Basin size: 1.49 square miles (3.9 km^{2})
- Discharge
  - location: Tidbury Creek
  - average: 1.82 cu ft/s (0.052 m^{3}/s) at mouth with Tidbury Creek

Basin features
- Progression: Tidbury Creek → St. Jones River → Delaware Bay → Atlantic Ocean
- River system: St. Jones River
- Tributaries
  - left: unnamed tributaries
  - right: unnamed tributaries
- Bridges: Willow Grove Road

Red House Branch is a 1.33 mi (2.14 km) long 1st order tributary to Tidbury Creek in Kent County, Delaware.

== Course ==
Red House Branch rises about 0.5 miles northwest of Derby Shores in Kent County, Delaware on the Almshouse Branch divide. Red House Branch then flows southeast to flow into Derby Pond.

== Watershed ==
Red House Branch drains 1.49 square miles (3.9 km^{2}) of area, receives about 44.8 in/year of precipitation, has a topographic wetness index of 592.32 and is about 6.0% forested.

== See also ==
- List of Delaware rivers

== Maps ==
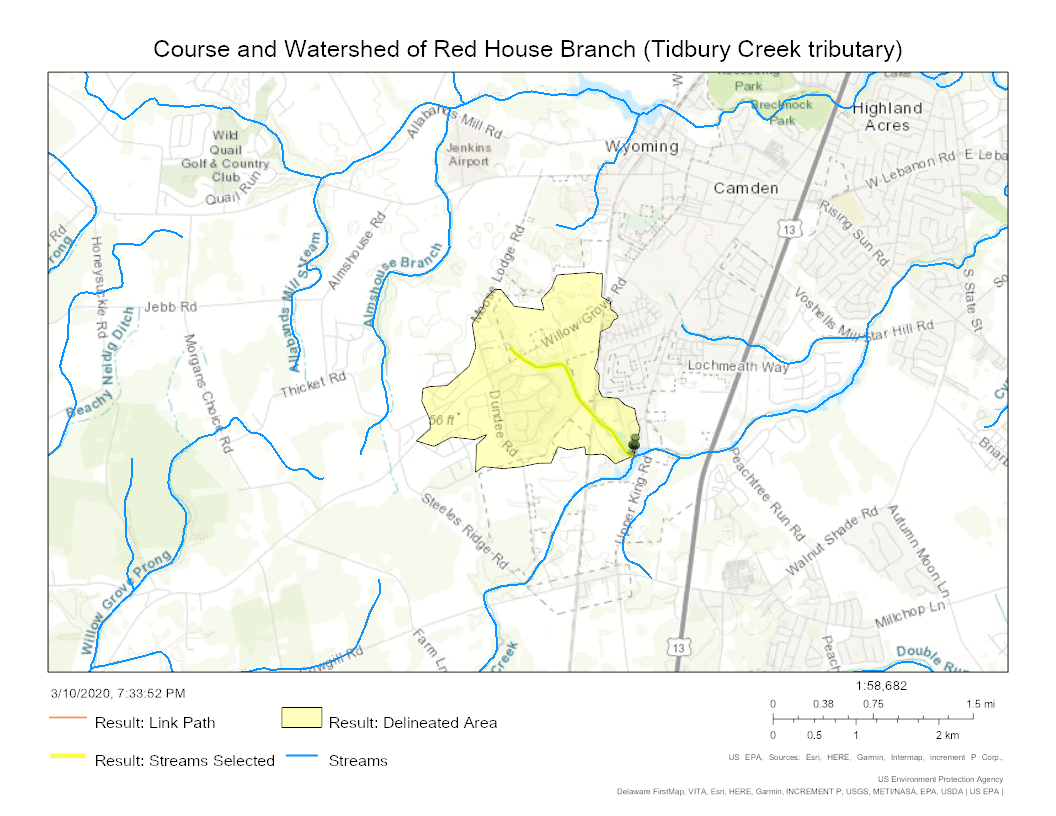
Course and Watershed of Red House Branch (Tidbury Creek tributary)
