= Tidbury Creek =

Stream in Delaware, USA

Tidbury Creek Tributary to St. Jones River
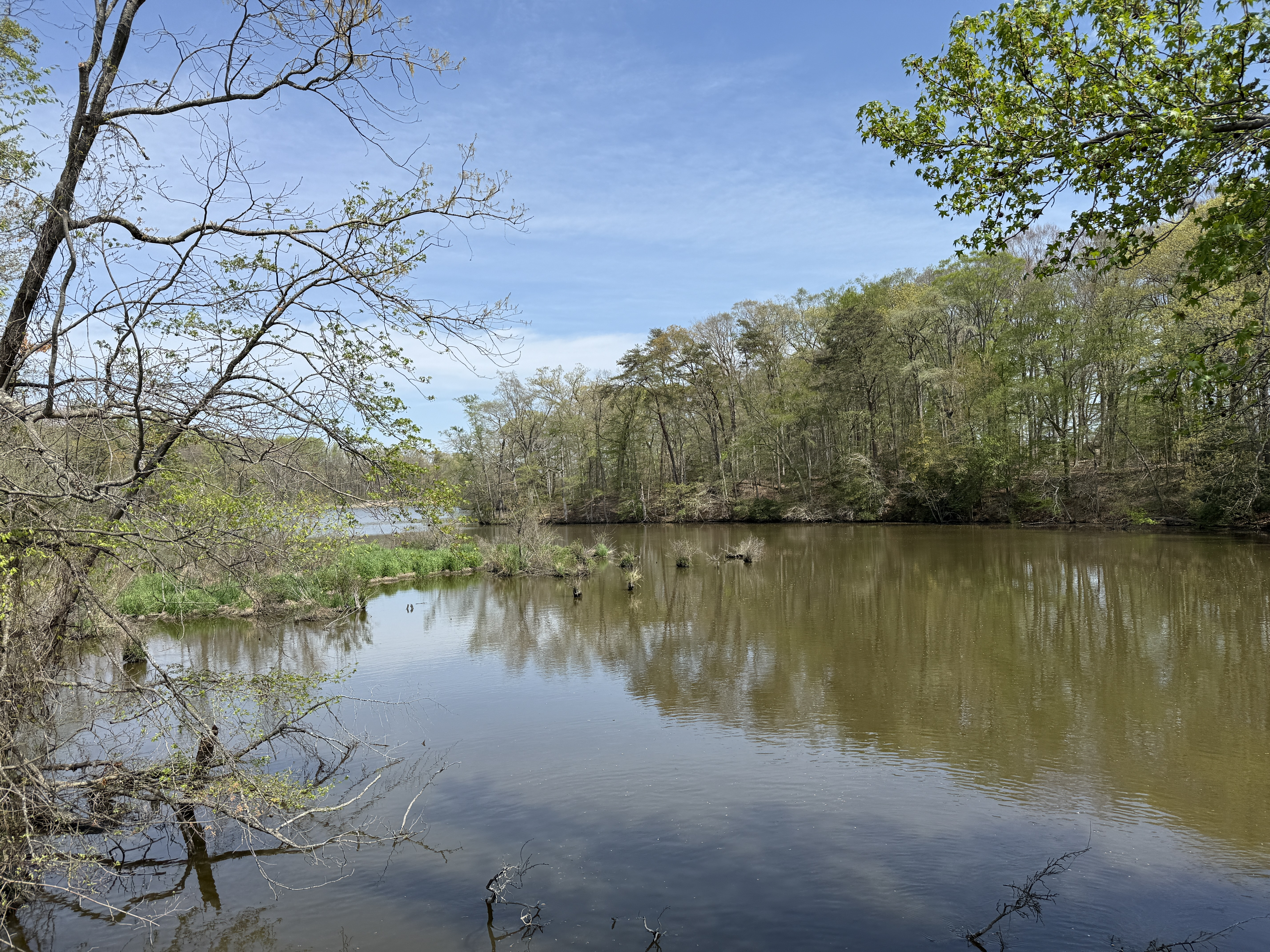
- Tidbury Creek in Highland Acres

- Location of Tidbury Creek mouth Tidbury Creek (the United States)

Location
- Country: United States
- State: Delaware
- County: Kent

Physical characteristics
- Source: Hudson Branch and Heron Drain divides
  - location: about 0.5 miles north of Viola, Delaware
  - coordinates: 39°03′02″N 075°34′27″W
  - elevation: 57 ft (17 m)
- Mouth: St. Jones River
  - location: Lebanon, Delaware
  - coordinates: 39°06′55″N 075°29′57″W
  - elevation: 0 ft (0 m)
- Length: 8.18 mi (13.16 km)
- Basin size: 12.14 square miles (31.4 km^{2})
- Discharge
  - location: St. Jones River
  - average: 14.64 cu ft/s (0.415 m^{3}/s) at mouth with St. Jones River

Basin features
- Progression: St. Jones River → Delaware Bay → Atlantic Ocean
- River system: St. Jones River
- Tributaries
  - left: Red House Branch; Newell Branch
  - right: unnamed tributaries
- Waterbodies: Derby Pond; Voshell Pond
- Bridges: Olin Dill Road, Henry Cowgill Road, Steeles Ridge Road, Dundee Road, Upper King Road, US 13, Voshells Mill-Star Hill Road, Rising Sun Road, South State Street, Sorghum Mill Road

Tidbury Creek is a 8.18 mi (13.16 km) long second-order tributary to the St. Jones River in Kent County, Delaware.

== Variant names ==
According to the Geographic Names Information System, it has also been known historically as:

- Fidbury Branch
- Tidburg Creek
- Tidbury Branch

== Course ==
Tidbury Creek rises about 0.5 miles north of Viola in Kent County, Delaware on the Hudson Branch and Heron Drain divides. Tidbury Creek then flows east to meet the St. Jones River at Lebanon, Delaware.

== Watershed ==
Tidbury Creek drains 12.14 square miles (31.4 km^{2}) of area, receives about 44.8 in/year of precipitation, has a topographic wetness index of 611.05 and is about 5.9% forested.

== See also ==
- List of Delaware rivers

== Maps ==
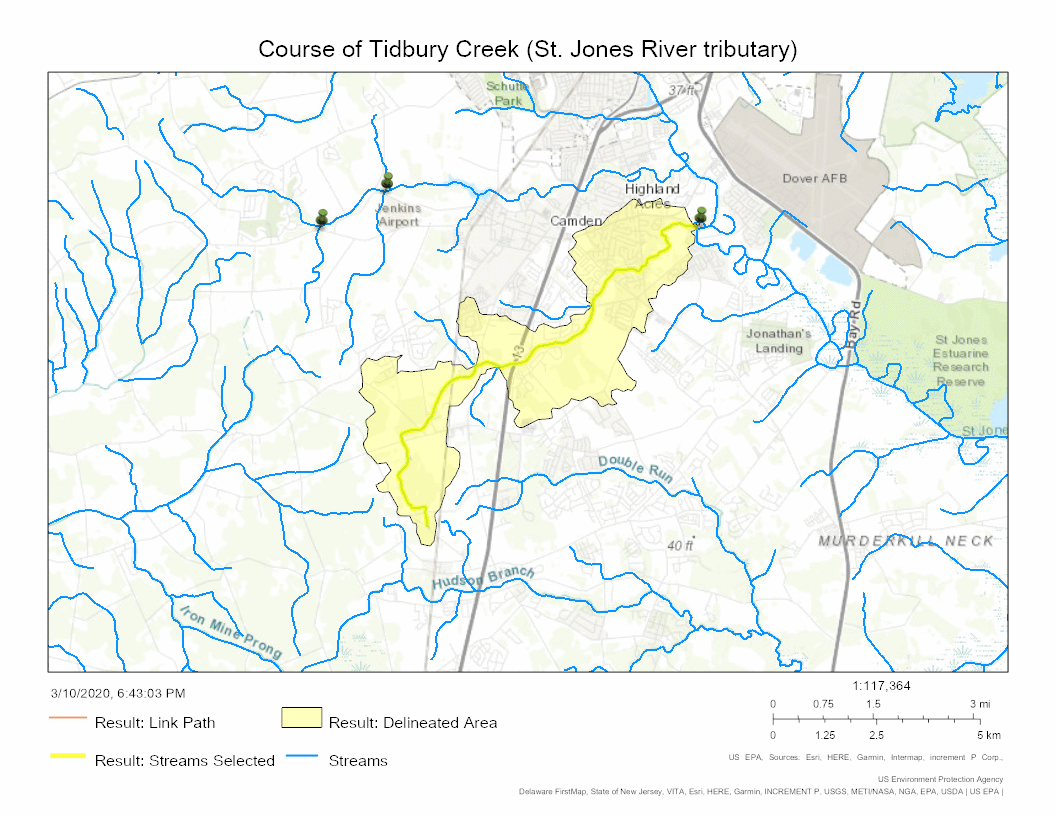
Course of Tidbury Creek (St. Jones River tributary)

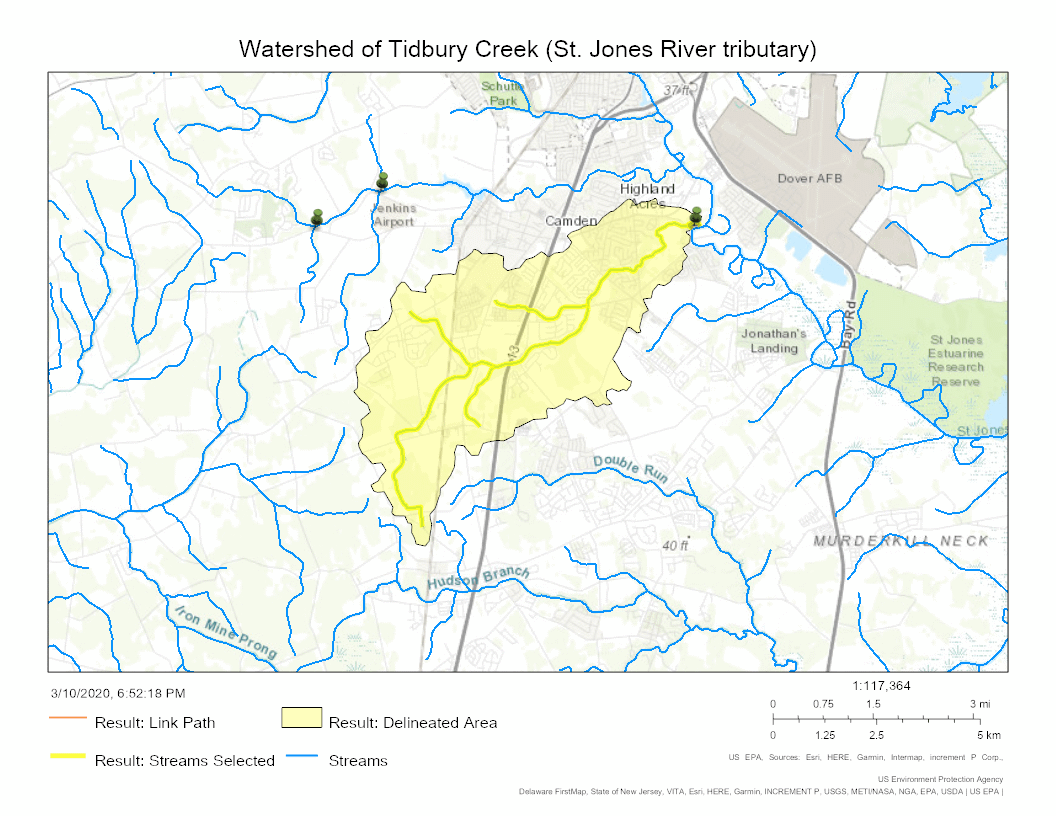
Watershed of Tidbury Creek (St. Jones River tributary)
