= Wyoming Historic District =

Historic district in Delaware, US

- U.S. National Register of Historic Places
- U.S. Historic district
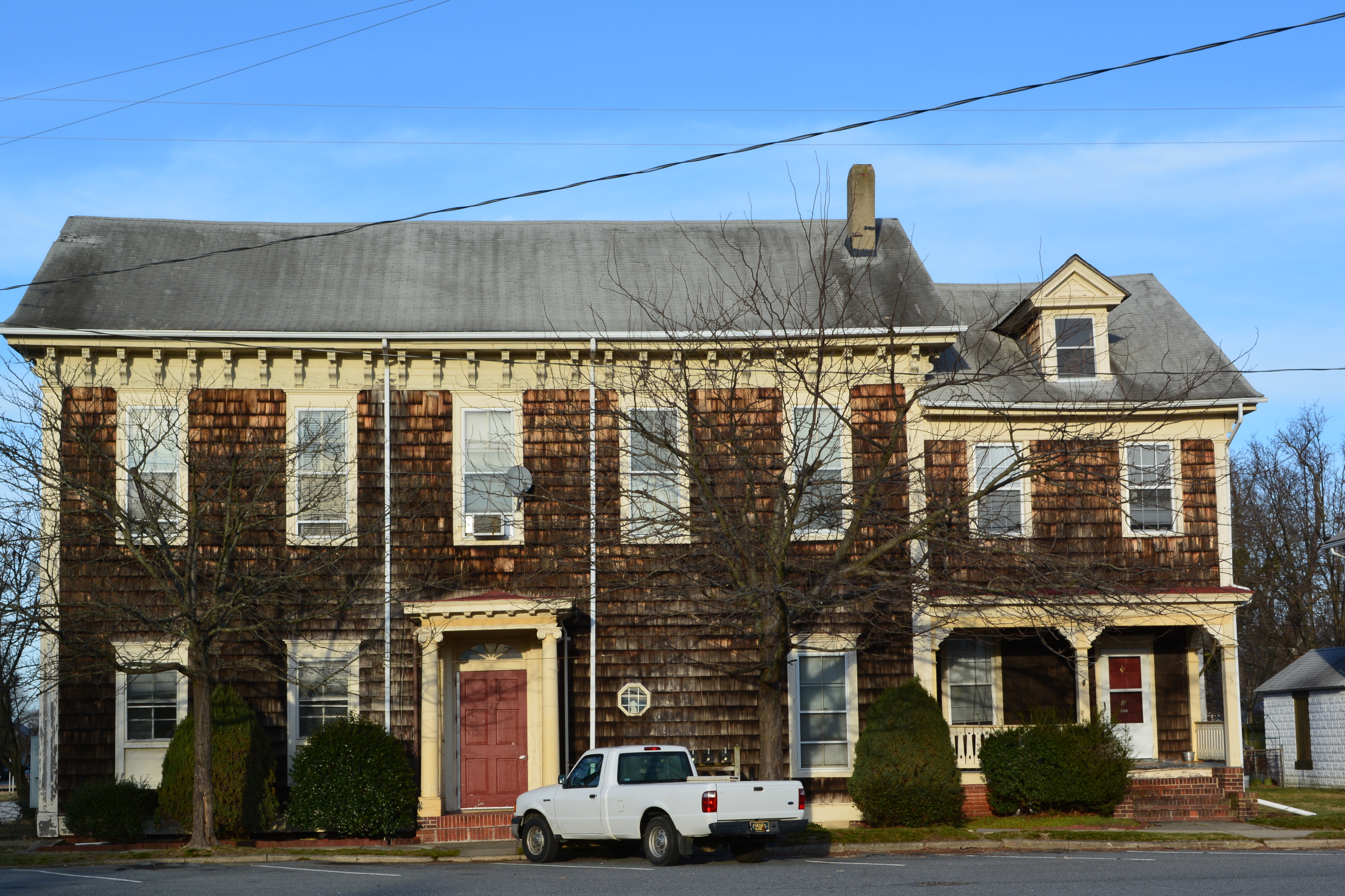
- House on North Railroad Avenue

- Location within Delaware Location within the United States
- Location: Roughly bounded by Front St., Rodney Ave., Southern Blvd., and Mechanic St., Wyoming, Delaware
- Coordinates: 39°07′11″N 75°33′29″W
- Area: 95 acres (38 ha)
- Architectural style: Classical Revival, Bungalow/craftsman, Queen Anne
- NRHP reference No.: 86003037
- Added to NRHP: February 18, 1987

Wyoming Historic District is a national historic district located at Wyoming, Kent County, Delaware. It encompasses 310 contributing buildings and 10 contributing structures in the town of Wyoming. It mainly consists of residential and commercial buildings developed after the arrival of the Delaware Railroad in 1855.

Significant development occurred from the 1870s to 1941 and include examples of the Classical Revival, Bungalow/craftsman, and Queen Anne styles. Notable buildings include the town hall, the former W. M. Harris & Son Vinegar & Canning Factory, Wyoming mill complex, the Wyoming United Methodist Church, First National Bank of Wyoming, and the main building of the former Wyoming Institute. The Wyoming Railroad Station is located in the district and listed separately.

It was listed on the National Register of Historic Places in 1987.
