= Allabands Mill Stream (Isaac Branch tributary) =

Stream in Delaware, USA

Allabands Mill Stream Tributary to Isaac Branch
- Location of Allabands Mill Stream mouth Allabands Mill Stream (Isaac Branch tributary) (the United States)

Location
- Country: United States
- State: Delaware
- County: Kent

Physical characteristics
- Source: divide between Allabands Mill Stream and Willow Grove Prong (Choptank River)
  - location: about 2 miles west-southwest of Alms House, Delaware
  - coordinates: 39°06′55″N 075°36′14″W
  - elevation: 58 ft (18 m)
- Mouth: Isaac Branch
  - location: about 0.5 miles east of Wild Quail, Delaware
  - coordinates: 39°05′41″N 075°36′30″W
  - elevation: 39 ft (12 m)
- Length: 1.80 mi (2.90 km)
- Basin size: 0.80 square miles (2.1 km^{2})
- Discharge
  - location: Isaac Branch
  - average: 0.98 cu ft/s (0.028 m^{3}/s) at mouth with Isaac Branch

Basin features
- Progression: Issac Branch → St. Jones River → Delaware Bay → Atlantic Ocean
- River system: St. Jones River
- Tributaries
  - left: unnamed tributaries
  - right: unnamed tributaries
- Bridges: Jebb Road, Westville Road

Allabands Mill Stream is a 1.80 mi (2.90 km) long 1st order tributary to Isaac Branch in Kent County, Delaware.

== History ==
Allabands Mill Stream was named for William Allaband, who operated a nearby grist mill called Allaband's Mill in the early 1800s.

== Course ==
Allabands Mill Stream rises about 2 miles west-southwest of Alms House in Kent County, Delaware on the Willow Grove Prong divide. Allabands Mill Stream then flows north to meet Isaac Branch about 0.5 miles east of Wild Quail, Delaware.

== Watershed ==
Allabands Mill Stream drains 0.80 square miles (2.1 km^{2}) of area, receives about 44.8 in/year of precipitation, has a topographic wetness index of 615.36 and is about 2% forested.

== See also ==
- List of Delaware rivers

== Maps ==
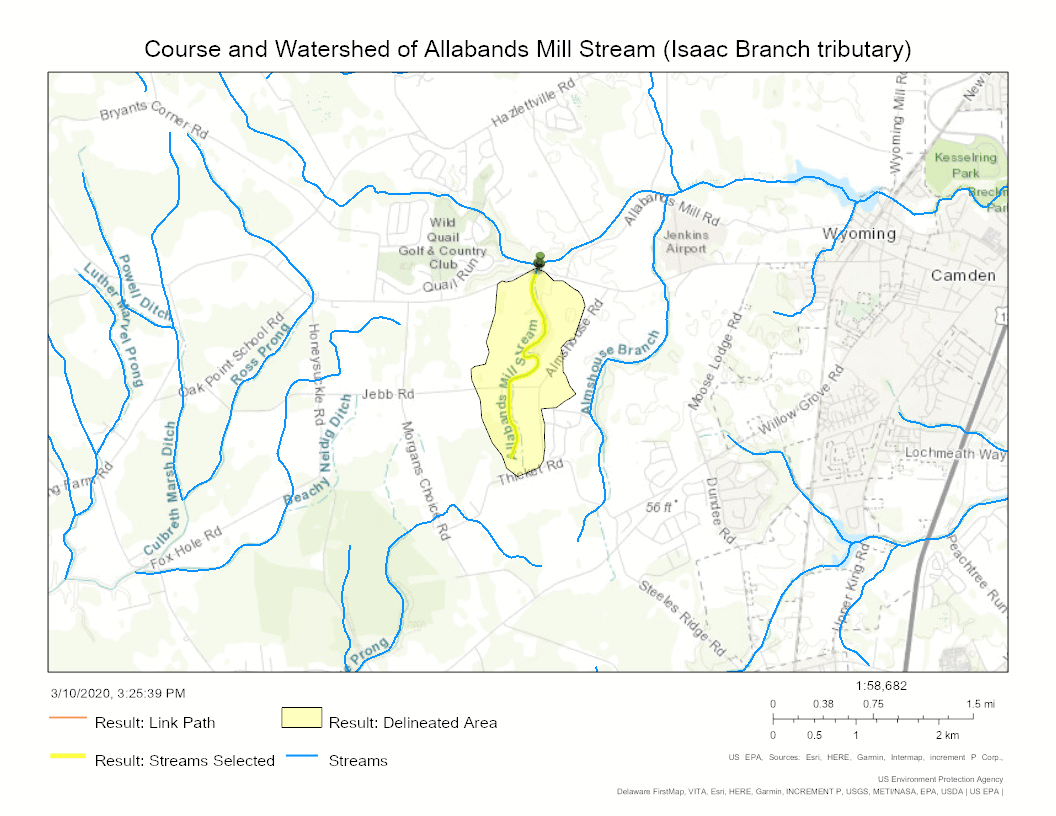
Course and Watershed of Allabands Mill Stream (Isaac Branch tributary)
