= Almshouse Branch (Isaac Branch tributary) =

Stream in Delaware, USA

Almshouse Branch Tributary to Isaac Branch
- Location of Almshouse Branch mouth Almshouse Branch (Isaac Branch tributary) (the United States)

Location
- Country: United States
- State: Delaware
- County: Kent

Physical characteristics
- Source: divide between Almshouse Branch and Cow Marsh Ditch (Choptank River)
  - location: about 3 miles southwest of Camden, Delaware
  - coordinates: 39°05′08″N 075°35′55″W
  - elevation: 62 ft (19 m)
- Mouth: Isaac Branch
  - location: about 2 miles west of Wyoming, Delaware
  - coordinates: 39°07′22″N 075°35′09″W
  - elevation: 30 ft (9.1 m)
- Length: 3.16 mi (5.09 km)
- Basin size: 2.29 square miles (5.9 km^{2})
- Discharge
  - location: Isaac Branch
  - average: 2.78 cu ft/s (0.079 m^{3}/s) at mouth with Isaac Branch

Basin features
- Progression: Issac Branch → St. Jones River → Delaware Bay → Atlantic Ocean
- River system: St. Jones River
- Tributaries
  - left: unnamed tributaries
  - right: unnamed tributaries
- Bridges: Thicket Road, Westville Road

Almshouse Branch is a 3.16 mi (5.09 km) long 1st order tributary to Isaac Branch in Kent County, Delaware.

== Course ==
Almshouse Branch rises about 3 miles southwest of Camden in Kent County, Delaware on the Cow Marsh Ditch divide. Almshouse Branch then flows north to meet Isaac Branch about 2 miles west of Wyoming, Delaware.

== Watershed ==
Almshouse Branch drains 2.29 square miles (5.9 km^{2}) of area, receives about 44.8 in/year of precipitation, has a topographic wetness index of 629.58 and is about 5% forested.

== See also ==
- List of Delaware rivers

== Maps ==
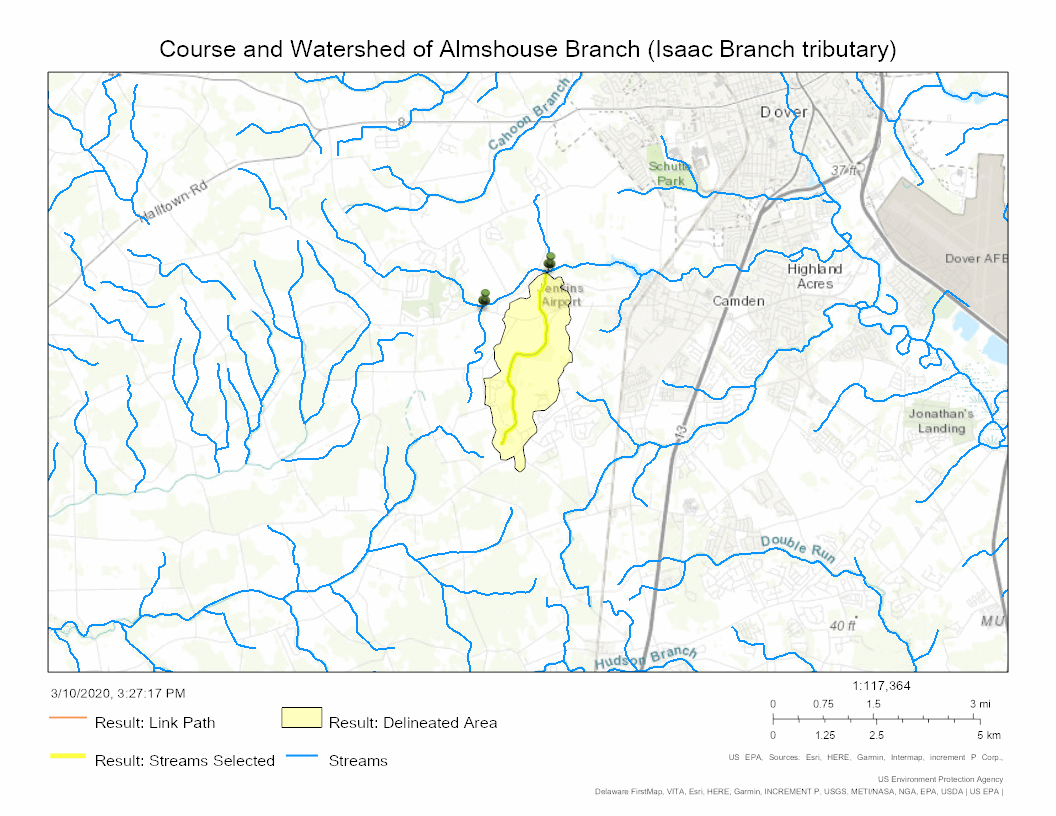
Course and Watershed of Almshouse Branch (Isaac Branch tributary)
