= Moores Lake =

- Location within Delaware
- Location: Kent County, Delaware
- Coordinates: 39°07′40″N 75°31′25″W
- Type: Lake
- Surface elevation: 10 feet (3.0 m)

Moores Lake is a lake located in Kent County, Delaware, United States. The lake is located along Issac Branch south of Dover and east of Camden at an elevation of 10 feet (3.0 m) above sea level.
