= Wyoming station (Delaware) =

Historic railway station in Delaware, US

Wyoming
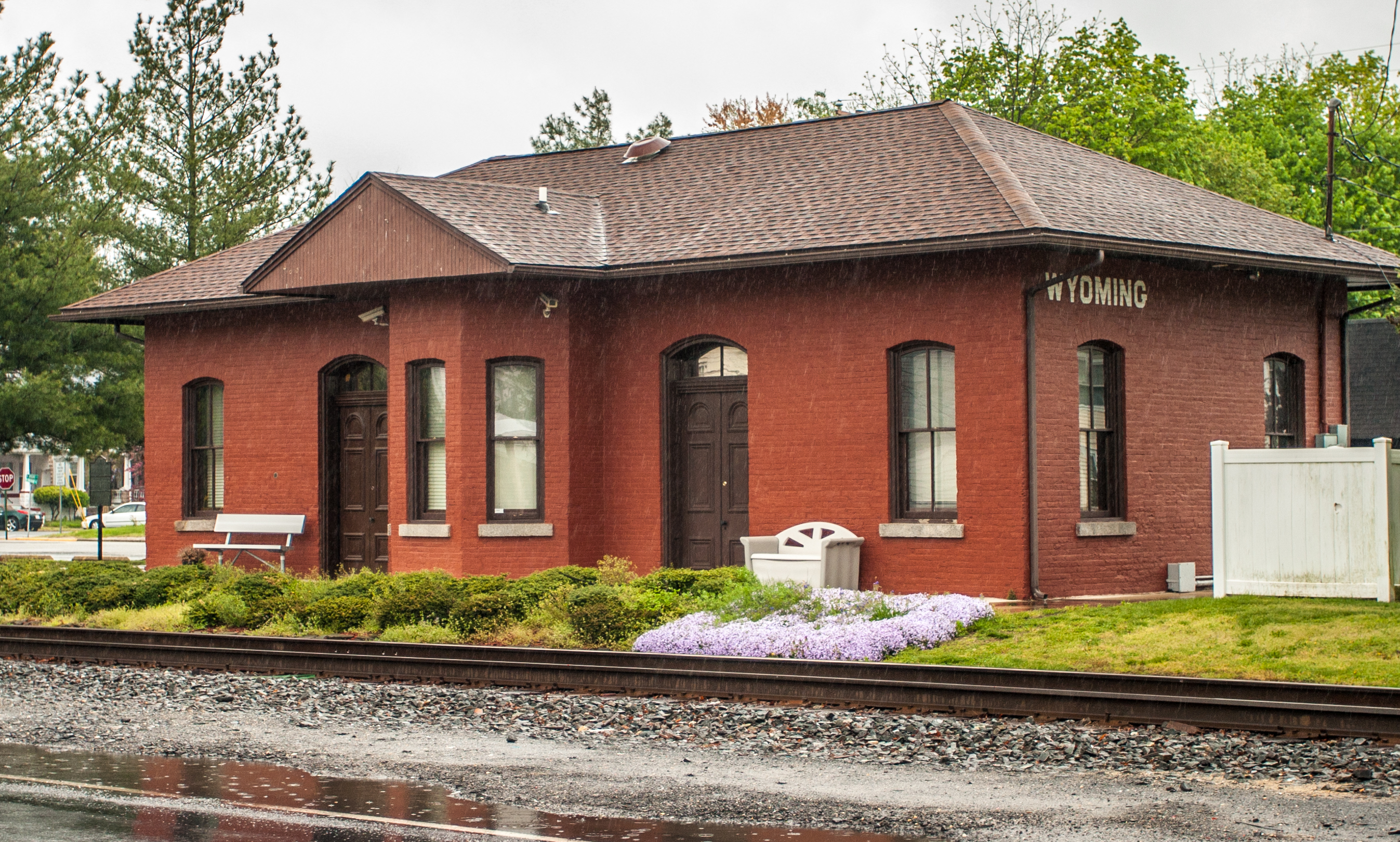
- Wyoming station in April 2013

General information
- Location: 1 North Railroad Avenue, Wyoming, Delaware
- Line: Delmarva Division

History
- Opened: 1872

Former services
Preceding station	Pennsylvania Railroad	Following station
Woodside toward Cape Charles	Delmarva Division	Dover toward Wilmington
- Wyoming Railroad Station
- U.S. National Register of Historic Places
- U.S. Historic district – Contributing property
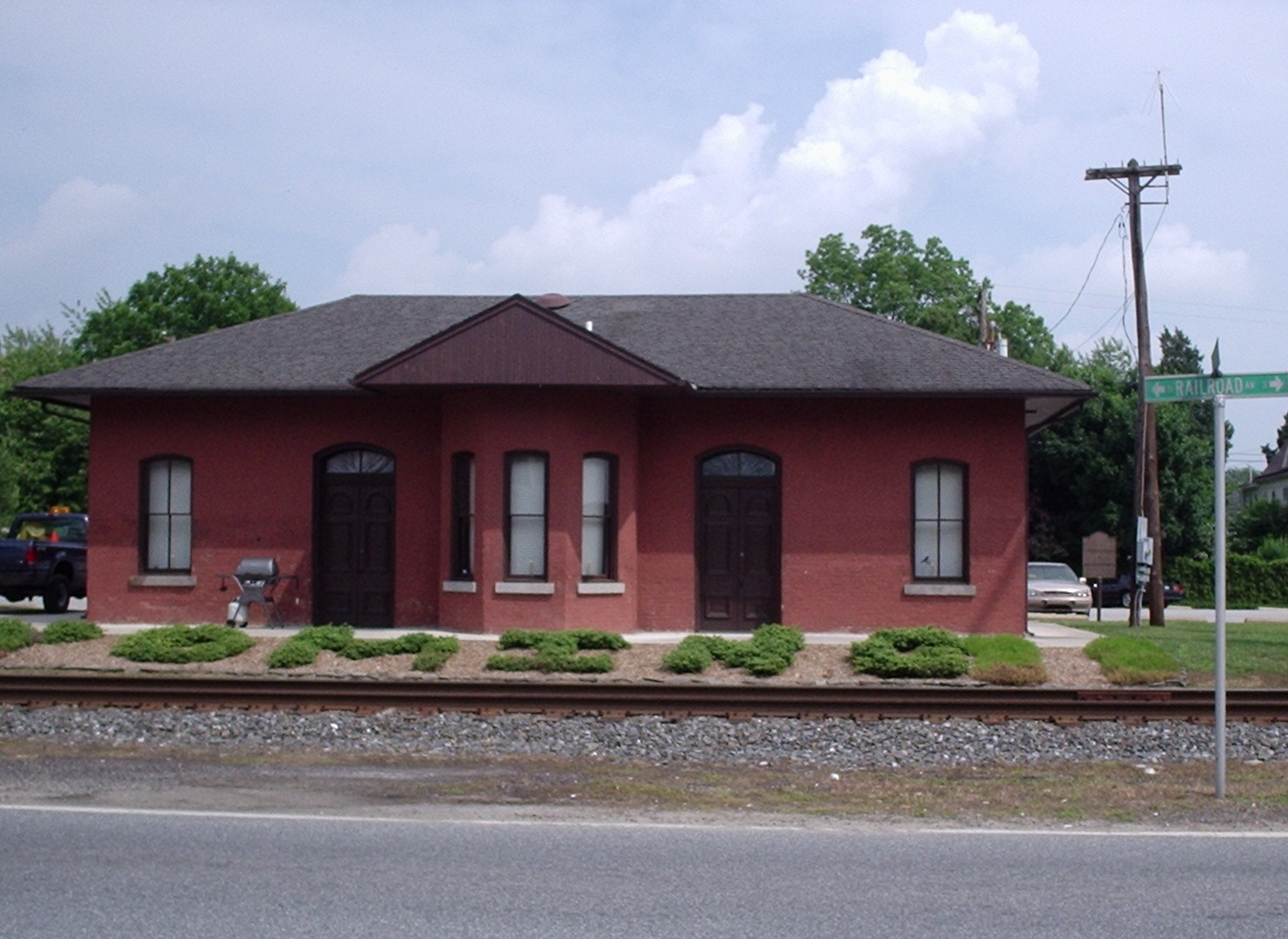
- Wyoming station in June 2005

- Location within Delaware Location within the United States
- Location: E. Railroad Ave., Wyoming, Delaware
- Coordinates: 39°07′06″N 75°33′32″W
- Area: 0.2 acres (0.081 ha)
- Built: 1872
- Architect: Delaware Railroad Co.
- Architectural style: Italianate
- NRHP reference No.: 80000931
- Added to NRHP: December 4, 1980
Location

Wyoming is a historic railway station located at Wyoming, Delaware, United States. It was built by the Delaware Railroad in 1872, and is a one-story, five-bay, brick, Italianate-style building. It has a low hipped roof with shallow eaves, round-headed doorways and windows, and a projecting bow-front window. The station has been renovated for use as town offices.

It was added to the National Register of Historic Places in 1980 as the Wyoming Railroad Station. It is located in the Wyoming Historic District.
