= Isaac Branch (St. Jones River tributary) =

Stream in Delaware, USA

Isaac Branch Tributary to St. Jones River
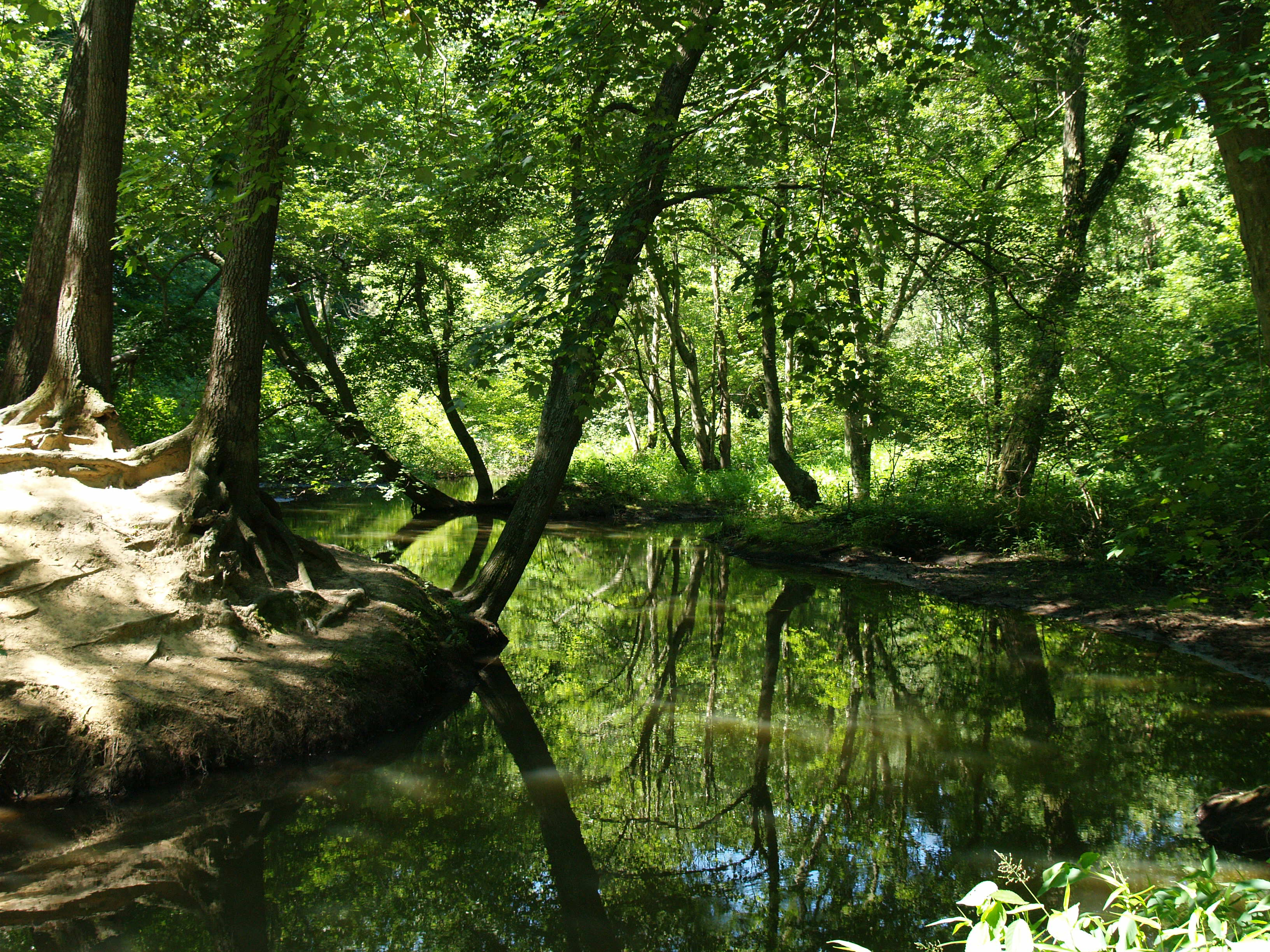
- Isaac Branch at Brecknock Park

- Location of Isaac Branch mouth Isaac Branch (St. Jones River tributary) (the United States)

Location
- Country: United States
- State: Delaware
- County: Kent
- City: Dover; Camden; Wyoming

Physical characteristics
- Source: divide between Isaac Branch and Cahoon Branch
  - location: about 1 mile southeast of Pearsons Corner, Delaware
  - coordinates: 39°08′26″N 075°38′28″W
  - elevation: 67 ft (20 m)
- Mouth: St. Jones River
  - location: Dover, Delaware
  - coordinates: 39°07′45″N 075°30′08″W
  - elevation: 0 ft (0 m)
- Length: 10.13 mi (16.30 km)
- Basin size: 14.82 square miles (38.4 km^{2})
- Discharge
  - location: St. Jones River
  - average: 17.88 cu ft/s (0.506 m^{3}/s) at mouth with St. Jones River

Basin features
- Progression: St. Jones River → Delaware Bay → Atlantic Ocean
- River system: St. Jones River
- Tributaries
  - left: unnamed tributaries
  - right: Allabands Mill Stream; Almshouse Branch
- Waterbodies: Wyoming Lake; Moores Lake
- Bridges: Hazlettville Road, Quail Run, Todds Mill Road, Wyoming Mill Road, US 13, S. State Street

Isaac Branch is a 10.13 mi (16.30 km) long 2nd order tributary to the St. Jones River in Kent County, Delaware.

== Variant names ==
According to the Geographic Names Information System, it has also been known historically as:

- Isaac's Branch
- Isaacs Branch
- Isaac Branch
- Mill Branch

== Course ==
Isaac Branch rises about 1 mile southeast of Pearsons Corner in Kent County, Delaware on the Cahoon Branch divide. Isaac Branch then flows east to meet the St. Jones River in Dover, Delaware.

== Watershed ==
Isaac Branch drains 14.82 square miles (38.4 km^{2}) of area, receives about 44.8 in/year of precipitation, has a topographic wetness index of 642.83 and is about 6% forested.

== See also ==
- List of Delaware rivers

== Maps ==
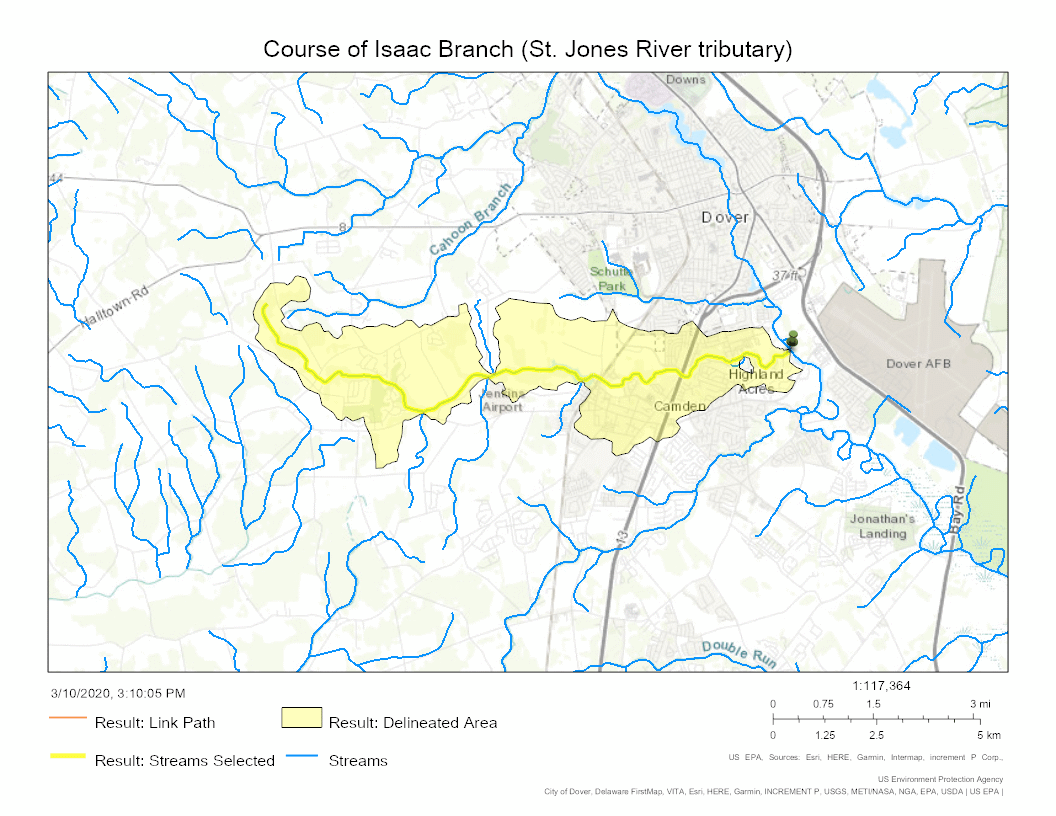
Course of Isaac Branch (St. Jones River tributary)

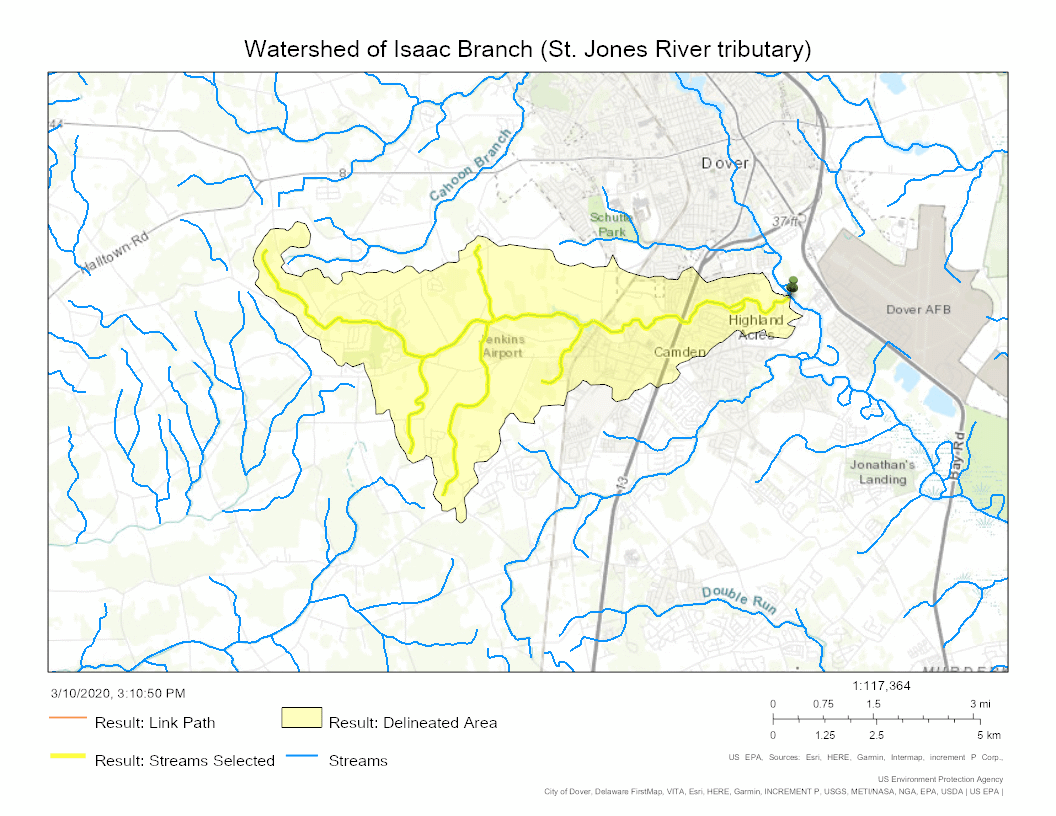
Watershed of Isaac Branch (St. Jones River tributary)
