= Lewis Family Tenant Agricultural Complex =

- U.S. National Register of Historic Places
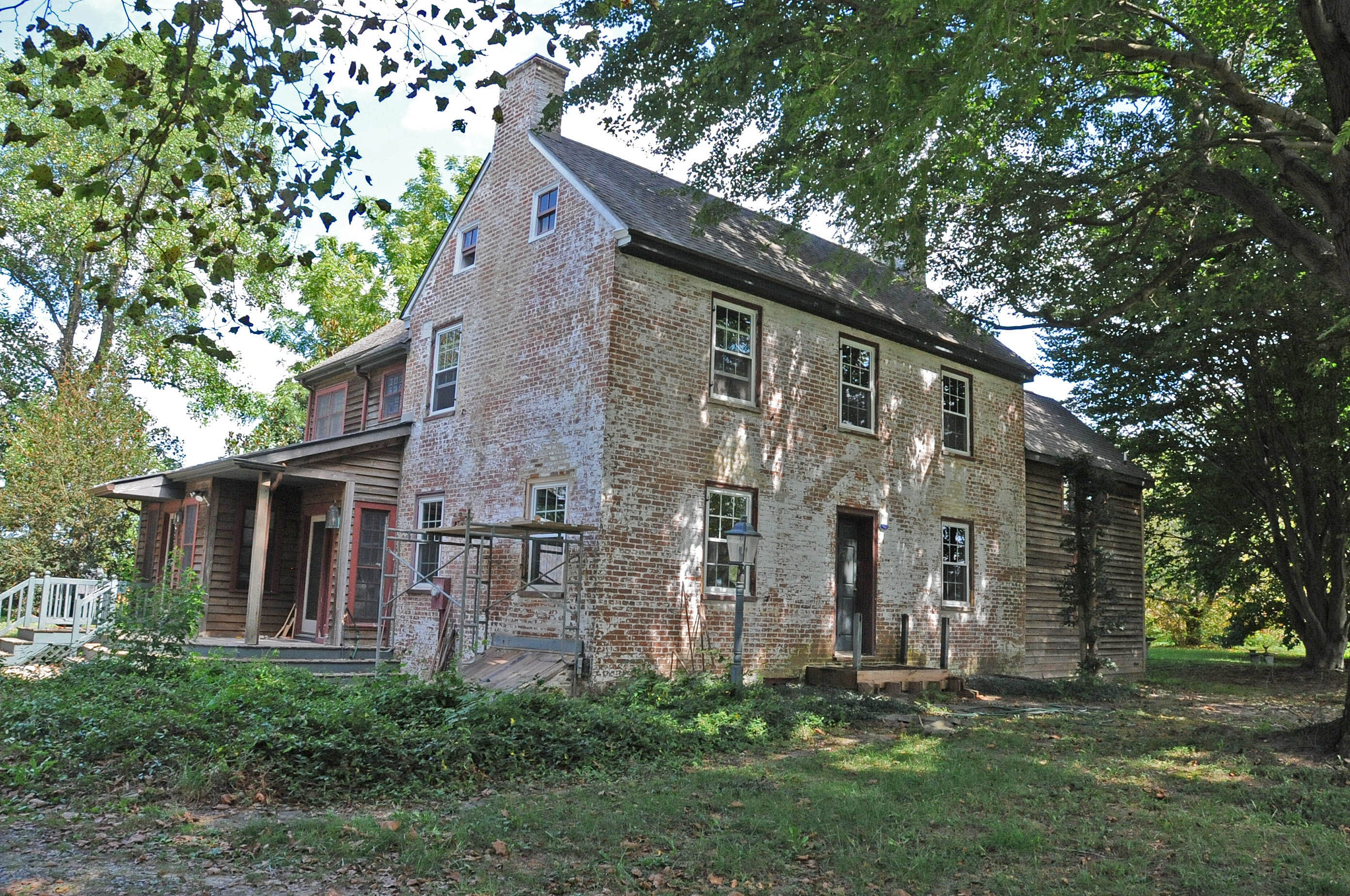

- Location within Delaware Location within the United States
- Location: Road 227, Wyoming, Delaware
- Coordinates: 39°06′16″N 75°36′30″W
- Area: 30.7 acres (12.4 ha)
- Built: 1850
- NRHP reference No.: 86001506
- Added to NRHP: August 13, 1986

Lewis Family Tenant Agricultural Complex is a historic home and farm located at Wyoming, Kent County, Delaware. It was built in 1850, and consists of a dwelling and two contributing barns. The house is a two-story, hall-and-parlor plan brick dwelling with a frame rear wing. The barns are 20th century replacements for older structures that were allowed to deteriorate and had to be replaced. They were built in the 1920s. The complex was constructed as a tenant farm by a large land owner.

It was listed on the National Register of Historic Places in 1986.
