= Wyoming, Delaware =

- Town
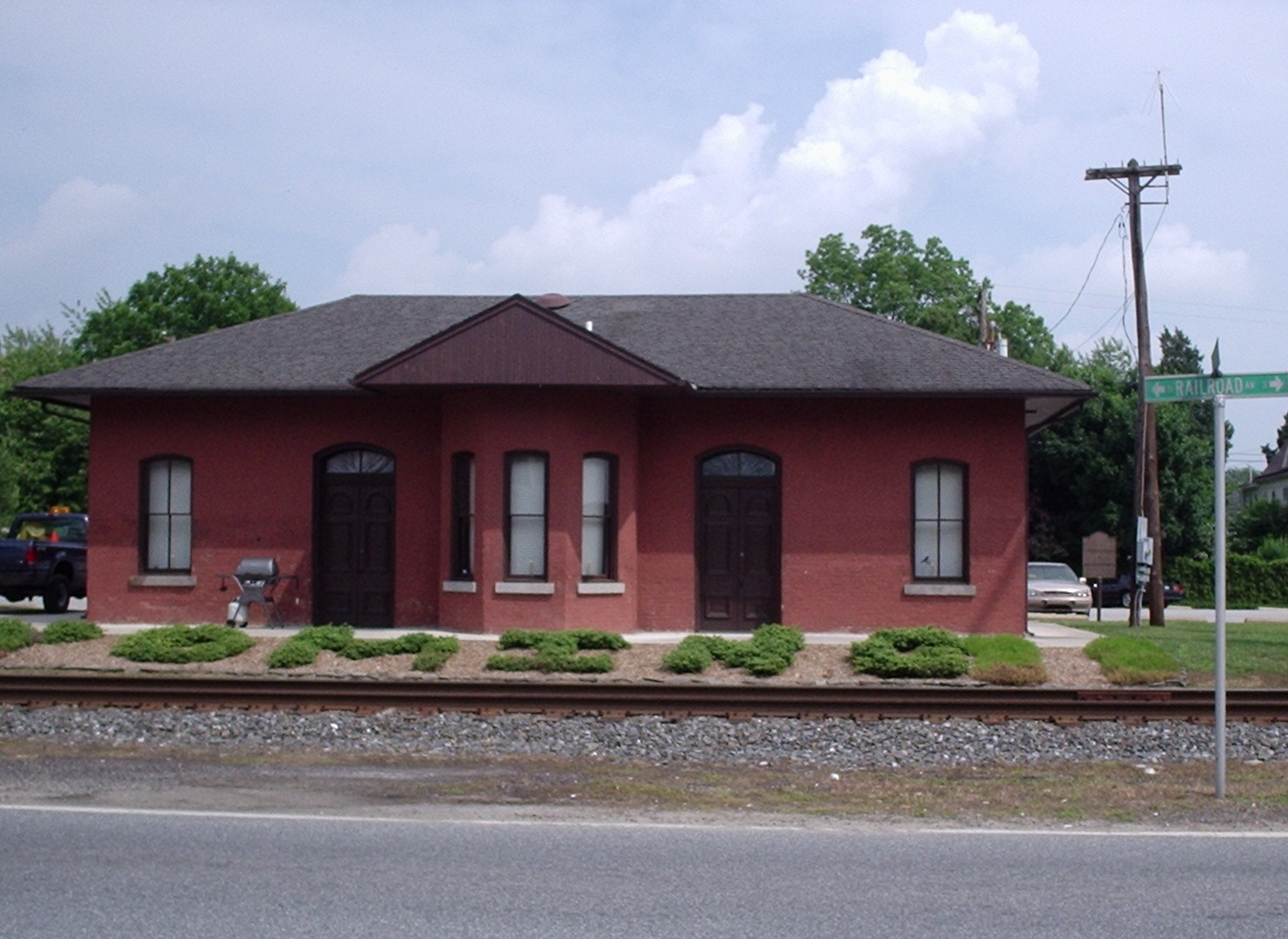
- Railroad depot in Wyoming

- Flag Seal
- Etymology: Wyoming Valley in Pennsylvania
- Location of Wyoming in Kent County, Delaware.

- Location within the state of Delaware Wyoming (the United States)
- Coordinates: 39°07′05″N 75°33′32″W
- Country: United States
- State: Delaware
- County: Kent

Government
  - Type: Mayor-council
  - Mayor: Doug Denison
  - Vice Mayor: Tracy Johovic

Area
  - Total: 1.06 sq mi (2.75 km^{2})
  - Land: 1.05 sq mi (2.71 km^{2})
  - Water: 0.015 sq mi (0.04 km^{2})
- Elevation: 39 ft (12 m)

Population (2020)
  - Total: 1,680
  - Density: 1,605.1/sq mi (619.74/km^{2})
- Time zone: UTC−5 (Eastern (EST))
  - Summer (DST): UTC−4 (EDT)
- ZIP code: 19934
- Area code: 302
- FIPS code: 10-81350
- GNIS feature ID: 217870
- Website: wyoming.delaware.gov

Wyoming is a town in Kent County, Delaware, United States. It was named after the Wyoming Valley in Pennsylvania. It is part of the Dover metropolitan area. The population was 1,680 in 2020.

== History ==
The community started when the nearby town of Camden would not grant access to the Delaware Railroad (later part of the Pennsylvania Railroad), which bypassed the town and built a railroad station one mile west of the center of town and named the area West Camden. In 1865, minister John J. Pierce moved to West Camden from the Wyoming Valley and laid out plots for new housing. Several individuals from the Wyoming Valley moved to the new community and it was decided to rename the community. The community, "Desiring to sever any shared identity or connection with Camden, residents chose to honor the new citizens by changing the name of the community to Wyoming." A post office was erected in 1866 and the community was incorporated into a town in 1869.

The Lewis Family Tenant Agricultural Complex, Wyoming Historic District, and Wyoming Railroad Station are listed on the National Register of Historic Places.

On February 22, 1975, a vote was held to merge with the bordering town of Camden; the residents of Camden voted 117 to 49 in favor of merging the towns, but the measure failed when Wyoming residents voted against the measure, 113 against to 78 in favor. The Wyoming town council had previously opposed a merger attempt in 1967.

== Geography ==
Wyoming is located at 39°07′05″N 75°33′32″W (39.1181681, –75.5588139).

According to the United States Census Bureau, the town has a total area of 0.7 square miles (1.8 km^{2}), of which 0.7 square miles (1.8 km^{2}) is land and 0.04 square miles (0.10 km^{2}) (2.90%) is water.

=== Climate ===
The climate in this area is characterized by hot, humid summers and generally mild to cool winters. According to the Köppen Climate Classification system, Wyoming has a humid subtropical climate, abbreviated "Cfa" on climate maps.

Climate data for Wyoming, Delaware
Month	Jan	Feb	Mar	Apr	May	Jun	Jul	Aug	Sep	Oct	Nov	Dec	Year
Record high °F (°C)	77 (25)	80 (27)	87 (31)	97 (36)	98 (37)	100 (38)	104 (40)	102 (39)	98 (37)	95 (35)	85 (29)	75 (24)	104 (40)
Mean daily maximum °F (°C)	43 (6)	47 (8)	55 (13)	66 (19)	75 (24)	83 (28)	87 (31)	85 (29)	79 (26)	69 (21)	59 (15)	47 (8)	66 (19)
Mean daily minimum °F (°C)	27 (−3)	29 (−2)	36 (2)	44 (7)	54 (12)	63 (17)	69 (21)	67 (19)	60 (16)	49 (9)	40 (4)	31 (−1)	47 (8)
Record low °F (°C)	−7 (−22)	−11 (−24)	7 (−14)	14 (−10)	28 (−2)	41 (5)	45 (7)	35 (2)	30 (−1)	25 (−4)	11 (−12)	−3 (−19)	−11 (−24)
Average precipitation inches (mm)	3.41 (87)	3.18 (81)	4.31 (109)	3.88 (99)	4.25 (108)	4.00 (102)	4.09 (104)	4.36 (111)	4.13 (105)	3.42 (87)	3.48 (88)	3.65 (93)	46.16 (1,174)
Source: The Weather Channel

== Demographics ==
Historical population
Census	Pop.	Note	%±
1870	280		—
1880	353		26.1%
1890	497		40.8%
1900	450		−9.5%
1910	517		14.9%
1920	661		27.9%
1930	684		3.5%
1940	870		27.2%
1950	911		4.7%
1960	1,172		28.6%
1970	1,062		−9.4%
1980	960		−9.6%
1990	977		1.8%
2000	1,141		16.8%
2010	1,313		15.1%
2020	1,680		28.0%
U.S. Decennial Census

=== 2020 census ===
As of the 2020 census, Wyoming had a population of 1,680. The median age was 33.4 years. 26.4% of residents were under the age of 18 and 10.8% of residents were 65 years of age or older. For every 100 females there were 90.0 males, and for every 100 females age 18 and over there were 86.0 males age 18 and over.

99.3% of residents lived in urban areas, while 0.7% lived in rural areas.

There were 651 households in Wyoming, of which 39.9% had children under the age of 18 living in them. Of all households, 41.8% were married-couple households, 16.7% were households with a male householder and no spouse or partner present, and 32.7% were households with a female householder and no spouse or partner present. About 25.0% of all households were made up of individuals and 6.7% had someone living alone who was 65 years of age or older.

There were 692 housing units, of which 5.9% were vacant. The homeowner vacancy rate was 1.3% and the rental vacancy rate was 4.4%.

Racial composition as of the 2020 census
Race	Number	Percent
White	1,052	62.6%
Black or African American	340	20.2%
American Indian and Alaska Native	11	0.7%
Asian	54	3.2%
Native Hawaiian and Other Pacific Islander	1	0.1%
Some other race	31	1.8%
Two or more races	191	11.4%
Hispanic or Latino (of any race)	124	7.4%

=== 2000 census ===
As of the census of 2000, there were 1,141 people, 448 households, and 315 families residing in the town. The population density was 1,690.0 inhabitants per square mile (652.5/km^{2}). There were 485 housing units at an average density of 718.3 per square mile (277.3/km^{2}). The racial makeup of the town was 79.49% White, 13.32% African American, 0.09% Native American, 3.86% Asian, 0.53% from other races, and 2.72% from two or more races. Hispanic or Latino of any race were 2.54% of the population.

There were 448 households, out of which 32.8% had children under the age of 18 living with them, 52.5% were married couples living together, 12.7% had a female householder with no husband present, and 29.5% were non-families. 24.1% of all households were made up of individuals, and 7.4% had someone living alone who was 65 years of age or older. The average household size was 2.55 and the average family size was 2.99.

In the town, the population was spread out, with 25.0% under the age of 18, 7.9% from 18 to 24, 31.4% from 25 to 44, 22.8% from 45 to 64, and 13.0% who were 65 years of age or older. The median age was 37 years. For every 100 females, there were 99.1 males. For every 100 females age 18 and over, there were 92.8 males.

The median income for a household in the town was $48,452, and the median income for a family was $54,265. Males had a median income of $35,625 versus $25,741 for females. The per capita income for the town was $21,254. About 1.8% of families and 3.6% of the population were below the poverty line, including 3.6% of those under age 18 and 3.4% of those age 65 or over.

== Education ==
Wyoming is located in the Caesar Rodney School District. Most students are zoned to W. B. Simpson Elementary School in Wyoming while some are zoned to W. Reilly Brown Elementary School in Dover. Students zoned to Simpson and Brown are zoned to Fred Fifer III Middle School in Camden. Caesar Rodney High School in Camden is the comprehensive high school for the entire district.

== Local attractions ==
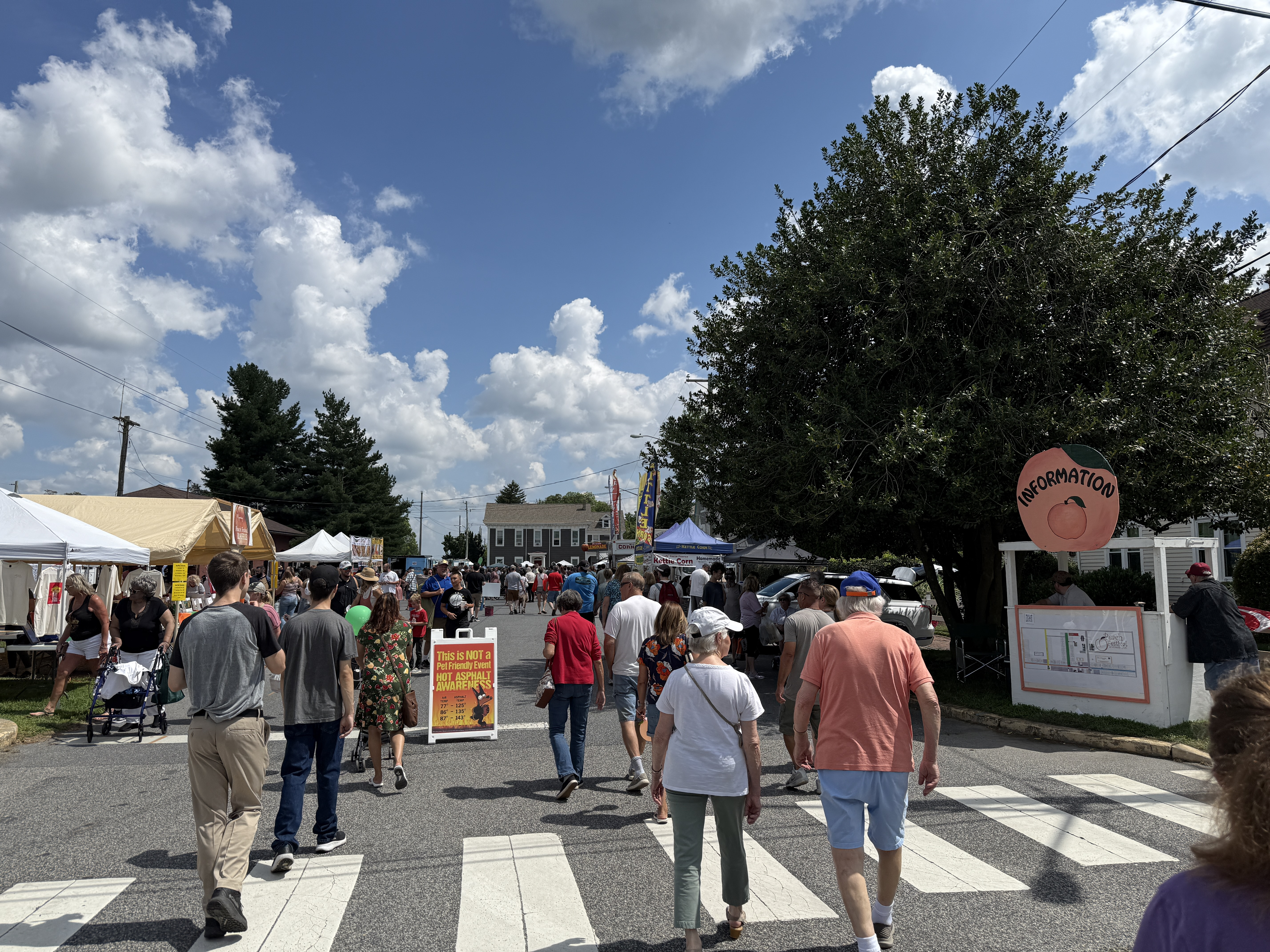
Wyoming Peach Festival

The "Wyoming Peach Festival" takes place every August. It offers pageants, homemade peach ice cream and tours of Fifer Orchards, which is the largest peach and apple producer in the state of Delaware.

The Caesar Rodney Homecoming Parade is held every November to support the Caesar Rodney Riders in their homecoming football game.

== Government ==
Wyoming is governed by a mayor-council system.

- Mayor: Doug Denison
- Vice Mayor: Empty seat
- Secretary: Tracy Johovic
- Treasurer: Kyle Dixon
- Council Person: Melissa Wooleyhand

== Infrastructure ==
=== Transportation ===
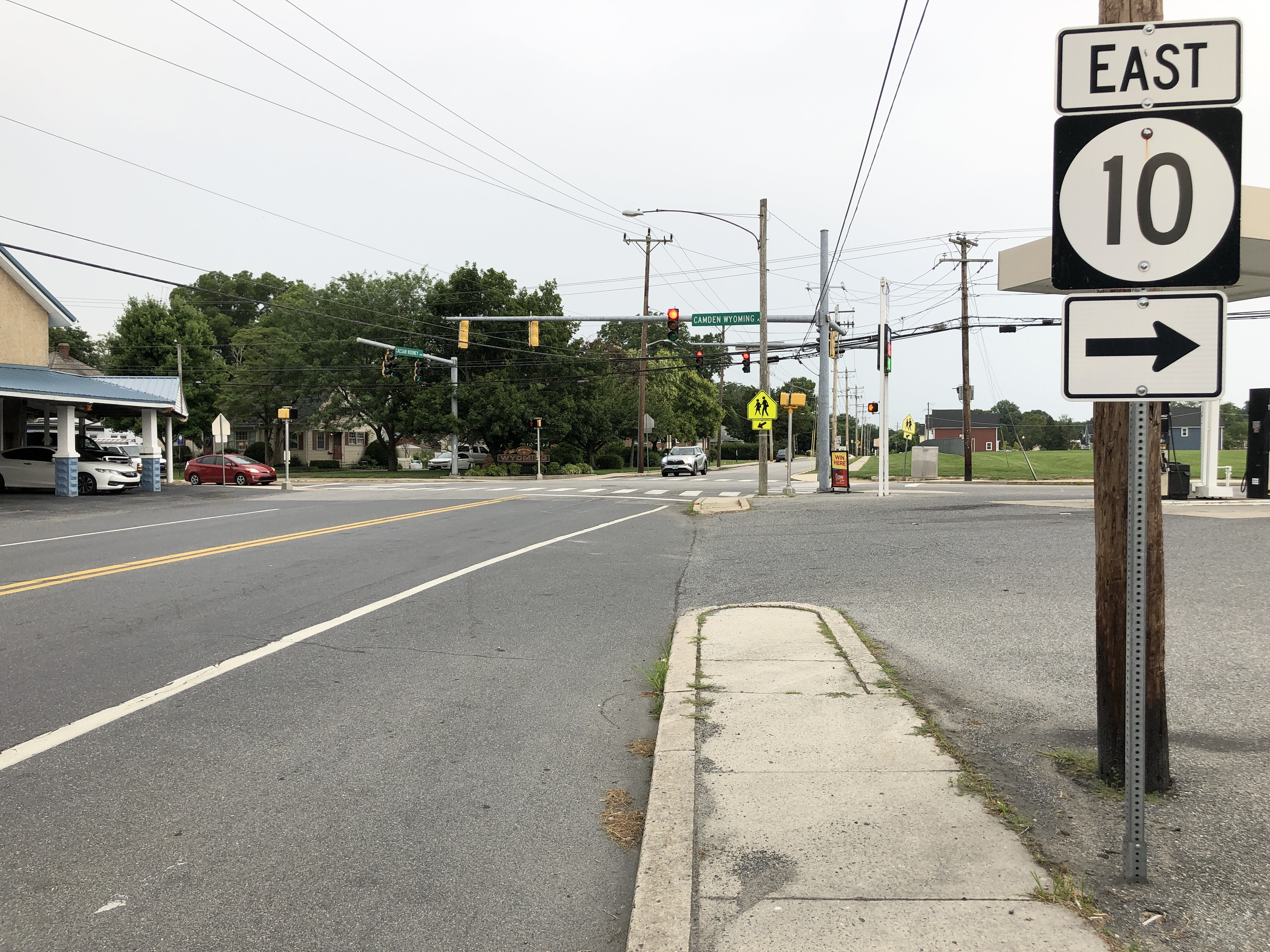
DE 10 eastbound along the Camden/Wyoming town line

Delaware Route 10 runs east–west along the southeastern edge of Wyoming on Caesar Rodney Avenue, heading west through rural western Kent County to the Maryland border and east along Camden Wyoming Avenue through Camden toward an intersection with U.S. Route 13 and Dover Air Force Base. Delaware Route 15 runs north–south through Wyoming on Southern Boulevard and Railroad Avenue, heading north toward Dover and south toward Woodside. DART First State provides bus service to Wyoming along Route 104, which passes along the eastern edge of town and runs south to the Walmart in Camden and north to the Dover Transit Center in Dover, where it connects to other local bus routes serving the Dover area. The Delmarva Central Railroad's Delmarva Subdivision line passes north–south through Wyoming. Jenkins Airport, a general aviation airport, is located just west of Wyoming.

=== Utilities ===
Delmarva Power, a subsidiary of Exelon, provides electricity to Wyoming. Chesapeake Utilities provides natural gas to the town. The Camden-Wyoming Sewer & Water Authority provides sewer and water service to Wyoming and the neighboring town of Camden. Trash and recycling collection in Wyoming is provided under contract by Republic Services.
