= Mispillion =

Mispillion may refer to:

Geography

- The Mispillion River in Delaware
- Mispillion Hundred, an unincorporated subdivision of Kent County, Delaware

Buildings

- Mispillion Light, a lighthouse in Delaware

Ships

- USS Mispillion (AO-105), a fleet replenishment oiler that served in commission in the United States Navy from 1945 to 1974 before transferring to the Military Sealift Command to serve as USNS Mispillion (T-AO-105)
- USNS Mispillion (T-AO-105), a fleet replenishment oiler that served in the U.S. Military Sealift Command from 1975 to 1991 after commissioned service in the U.S. Navy as USS Mispillion (AO-105)
