= Old Baptist Church Branch =

Stream in Delaware, USA

Old Baptist Church Branch Tributary to Fishing Branch
- Location of Old Baptist Church Branch mouth Old Baptist Church Branch (the United States)

Location
- Country: United States
- State: Delaware
- County: Kent

Physical characteristics
- Source: Murderkill River divide
  - location: about 0.25 miles west of Spring Hill, Delaware
  - coordinates: 38°58′38″N 75°26′07″W
  - elevation: 22 ft (6.7 m)
- Mouth: Fishing Branch
  - location: about 0.5 miles east of Spring Hill, Delaware
  - coordinates: 38°58′07″N 75°25′00″W
  - elevation: 3 ft (0.91 m)
- Length: 2.00 mi (3.22 km)
- Basin size: 1.75 square miles (4.5 km^{2})
- Discharge
  - location: Fishing Branch
  - average: 2.20 cu ft/s (0.062 m^{3}/s) at mouth with Fishing Branch

Basin features
- Progression: Fishing Branch → Mispillion River → Delaware Bay → Atlantic Ocean
- River system: Mispillion River
- Tributaries
  - left: unnamed tributaries
  - right: unnamed tributaries
- Bridges: DE 1, Reynolds Road

Old Baptist Church Branch is a 2.00 mi (3.22 km) long 1st order tributary to Fishing Branch in Kent County, Delaware. This is the only stream of this name in the United States.

== Course ==
Old Baptist Church Branch rises on the Murderkill River divide about 0.25 miles west of Spring Hill, Delaware. Old Baptist Church Branch then flows southeast then northeast to meet Fishing Branch about 0.5 miles east of Spring Hill, Delaware.

== Watershed ==
Old Baptist Church Branch drains 1.75 square miles (4.5 km^{2}) of area, receives about 45.5 in/year of precipitation, has a topographic wetness index of 613.40 and is about 8.0% forested.

== See also ==
- List of Delaware rivers

== Maps ==
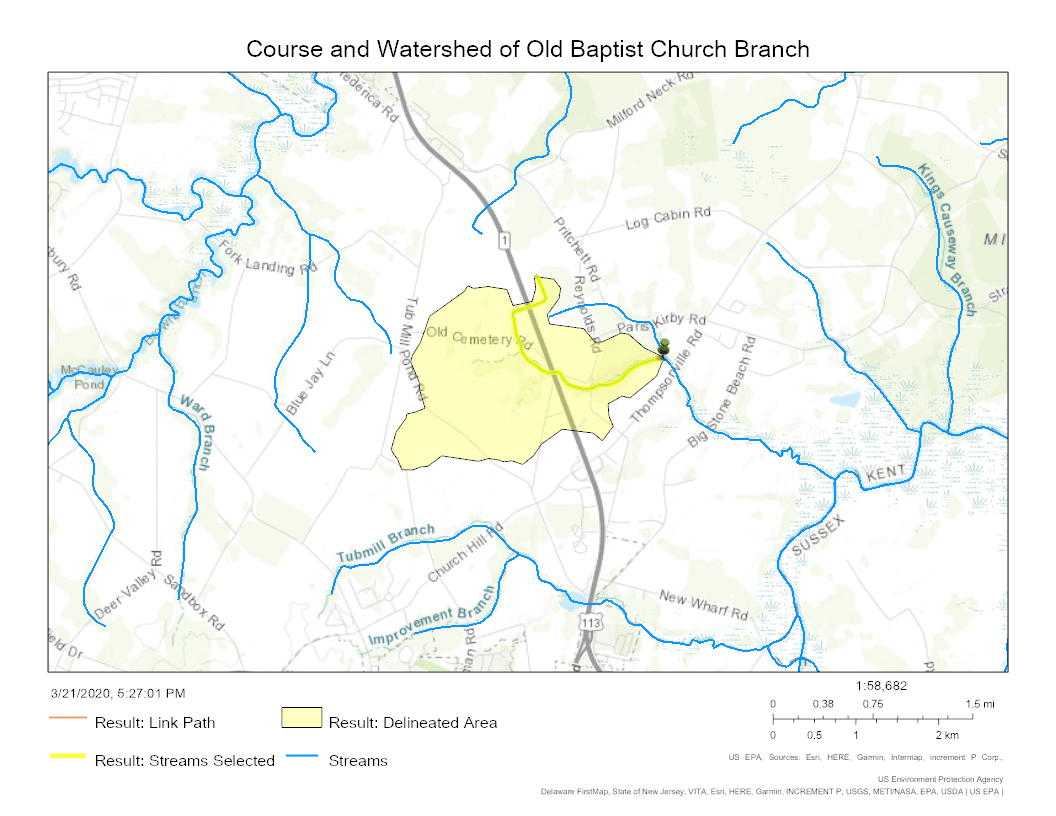
Course and Watershed of Old Baptist Church Branch
