= Tubmill Branch (Swan Creek tributary) =

Stream in Delaware, USA

Tubmill Branch Tributary to Mispillion River
- Location of Tubmill Branch mouth Tubmill Branch (Swan Creek tributary) (the United States)

Location
- Country: United States
- State: Delaware
- County: Kent

Physical characteristics
- Source: Lednum Branch divide
  - location: Hall Estates, Delaware
  - coordinates: 38°56′36″N 075°27′49″W
  - elevation: 44 ft (13 m)
- Mouth: Swan Creek at Tubmill Pond
  - location: about 0.5 miles south of Lynch Heights, Delaware
  - coordinates: 38°56′35″N 075°25′50″W
  - elevation: 10 ft (3.0 m)
- Length: 2.16 mi (3.48 km)
- Basin size: 3.32 square miles (8.6 km^{2})
- Discharge
  - location: Swan Creek via Tubmill Branch
  - average: 4.20 cu ft/s (0.119 m^{3}/s) at mouth with Swan Creek

Basin features
- Progression: northeast then southeast
- River system: Mispillion River
- Tributaries
  - left: unnamed tributaries
  - right: Improvement Branch
- Bridges: DE 15, Bowman Road, Church Hill Road

Tubmill Branch is a 2.16 mi (3.48 km) long 2nd order tributary to the Swan Creek in Kent County, Delaware. This stream is one of two that are named Tubmill Branch in the United States. The other is in Caroline County, Maryland.

== Course ==
Tubmill Branch rises on the Lednum Branch divide about 0.5 miles south of Lynch Heights, Delaware. Tubmill Branch then flows northeast then southeast to meet Swan Creek at Hall Estates, Delaware.

== Watershed ==
Tubmill Branch drains 3.32 square miles (8.6 km^{2}) of area, receives about 45.7 in/year of precipitation, has a topographic wetness index of 552.59 and is about 8.3% forested.

== See also ==
- List of Delaware rivers

== Maps ==
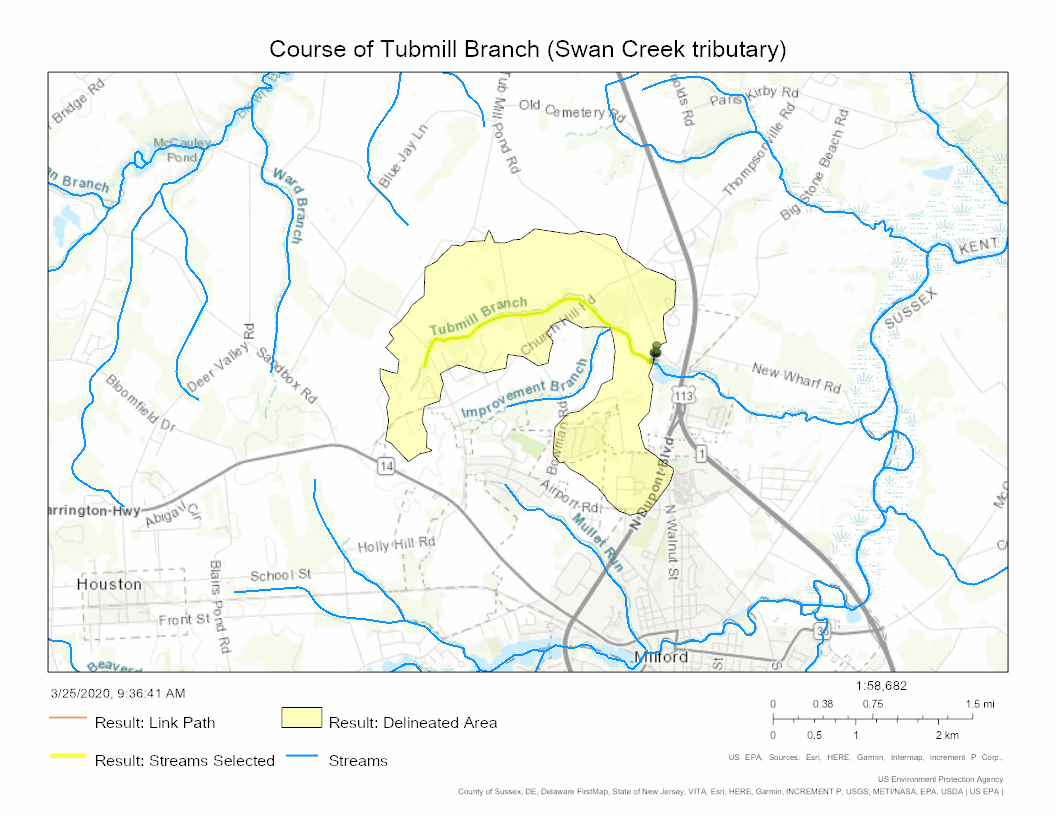
Course of Tubmill Branch (Swan Creek tributary)

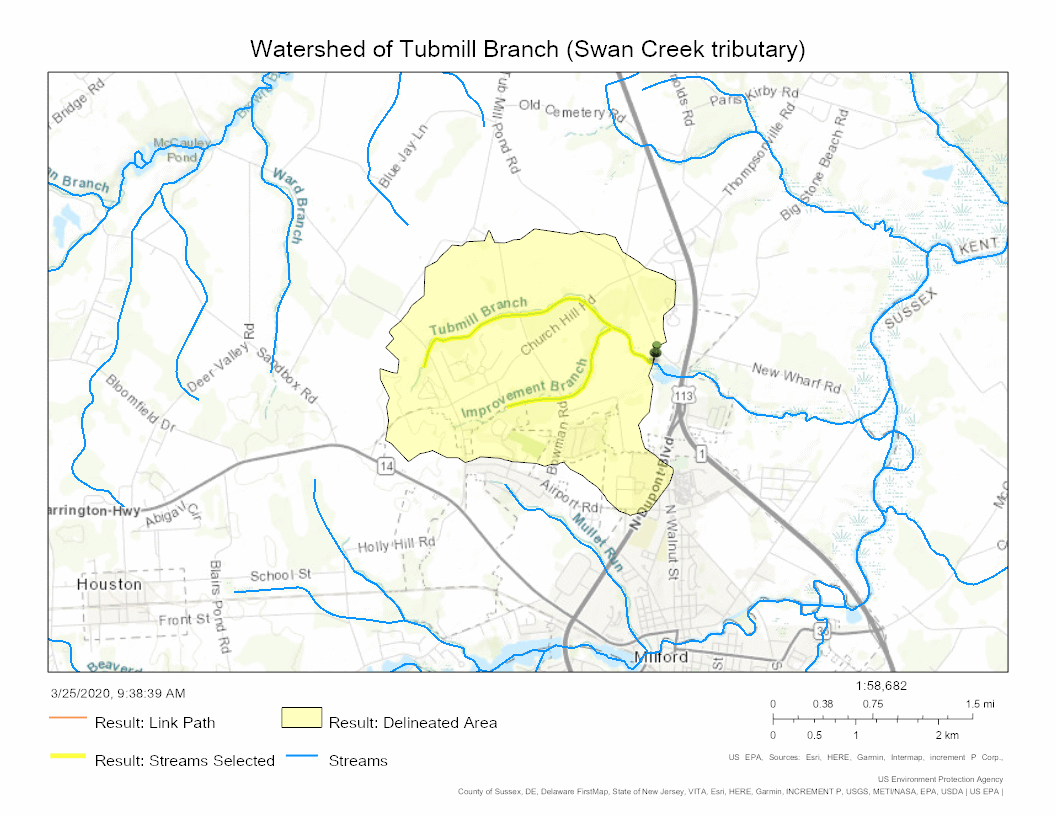
Watershed of Tubmill Branch (Swan Creek tributary)
