= Shipcarpenter Square =

Historic neighborhood in Delaware

- Residential development
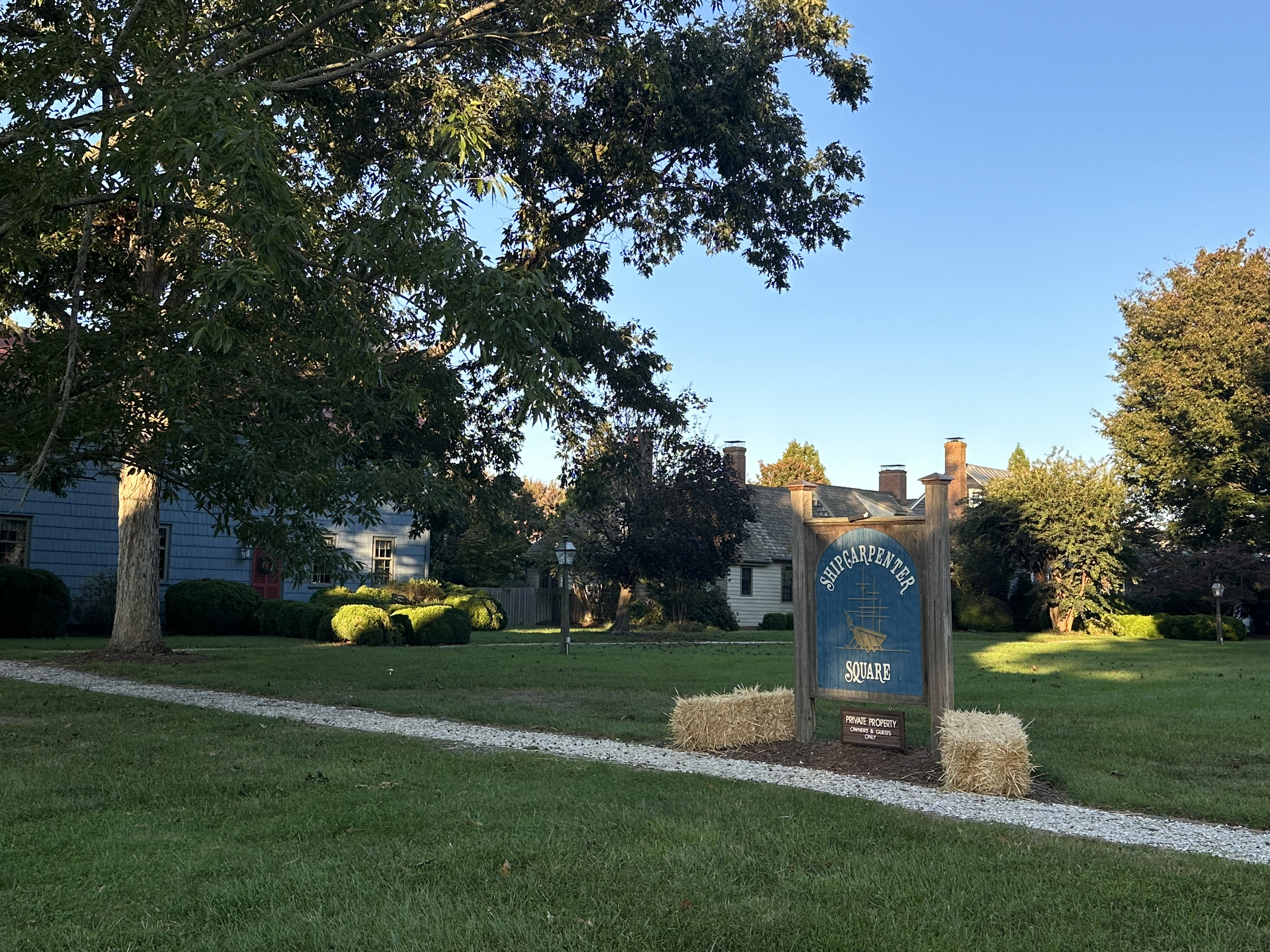
- Entrance to the Commons at Shipcarpenter Square
- Design: Lewestown Restorations, Inc.
- Architectural style: Colonial and Victorian era houses
- Manager: Shipcarpenter Square Association, Inc.
- Location: Lewes, Delaware, US
- Interactive map of Shipcarpenter Square
- Coordinates: 38.776084°N 75.144788°W
- Website: sites.google.com/view/shipcarpenter-square/home

Shipcarpenter Square is an historic residential neighborhood located in Lewes, Delaware. The neighborhood has well-preserved Colonial and Victorian-era houses, said to provide a bucolic setting and charm to the seaside community while preserving the architectural heritage of the region. A distinctive feature of the neighborhood is that all of the homes have been relocated to the neighborhood from elsewhere.

The name "Shipcarpenter Square" reflects its historical connection to the local shipbuilding industry and in a locale that was once important for the menhaden fisheries. Originally conceived in the 1980s, the developers subdivided the land and relocated buildings from other locales, and then restored them with modern utilities.

Shipcarpenter Square is located between 3rd Street and 4th Street in one direction and between Park Ave and Burton Avenue in the other direction, and lies entirely within the town of Lewes, Delaware.

The private homes that have been relocated to Shipcarpenter Square date from 1730 to 1880, and are Colonial in design as well as Victorian.

== History ==
The founders of Shipcarpenter Square were T. David Dunbar and Jack Vessels, and they started the project in 1983. Vessels was a furniture restorer with an interest in colonial architecture. The Cape Gazette newspaper described Vessels as "One of the main authorities of historic home restoration in Coastal Delaware", in recognition of his founding of Shipcarpenter Square and his restoration efforts.

Dunbar partnered with Vessels as an investor at the inception of the project. Dunbar had on-going interest in local history and was Vessels's neighbor at the time they conceived the idea for the development. The two identified the first several houses to move to Shipcarpenter Square and restored them collaboratively after successfully moving them. The partnership of Dunbar and Vessels was known as Lewestown Restorations, Inc.

Dunbar and Vessels relocated various buildings including farmhouses, barns, a fisherman's cottage, Victorian houses, a log house, the Rehoboth Life Saving Station and others, from elsewhere in Delaware and Maryland. The structures were low cost or free, Dunbar and Vessels having paid at most USD $1500 for them. Following relocation to Shipcarpenter Square, Vessels and Dunbar restored the building and added modern electrical and plumbing systems, and kitchens while retaining their architectural integrity.

Within the first 10 years of the development, Dunbar and Vessels relocated nearly 40 houses to Shipcarpenter Square and restored them, and 26 houses in just the first five years. In 1984, their acquisition of the homes, relocation, restoration, and historically accurate additions averaged about USD $125,000, including the cost of the land.

The original layout of Shipcarpenter Square included an out-of-the-way common semi-circular internal road intended to preserve an historic look, keeping automobiles out of sight. Many of the homes surround a quadrangle at the center of the property, referred to as the Commons.

In the 1990s, Dunbar and Vessels withdrew from the effort, and management was taken over by the development's homeowner association, known as the Shipcarpenter Square Association, Inc. As of 2023, the number of homes in the development is approximately the same as the number that had been relocated by Dunbar and Vessels by the early 1990s.

=== Location ===
The property on which Shipcarpenter Square was built is adjacent to the Historic Shipcarpenter Street Campus of the Lewes Historical Society. At the inception of the project, Vessels and Dunbar acquired the parcel of undeveloped land next to the society's campus. The property is 11 acres (4.5 ha) in area and is located 2 city blocks from the Lewes and Rehoboth Canal and less than a mile from the seashore, making it close to the Lewes town center.

The adjacent Lewes Historical Society's campus includes various buildings of historical significance that were relocated from elsewhere in Delaware to the campus, restored, and then put on display as museums. Shipcarpenter Square co-founder Dunbar stated that the relocations at the Lewes Historical Society were an inspiration for his and Vessels's development except their idea was to restore the houses as private residences rather than as museums.

=== Homes ===
Examples of the approximately 40 homes that were relocated to Shipcarpenter Square and restored include one that was a stagecoach stop and tavern in Willow Grove, Delaware. Another was a life-saving station from 1872, and there is a farmhouse dating to 1790. One home named Mount Pleasant that was relocated from Kent County, Delaware, was originally built in 1730.

One home in Shipcarpenter Square has a replica of the Mispillion Lighthouse.

Some critics have contended that relocation of the homes followed by modernization of plumbing, electrical, and cooking facilities compromises the historical context of the homes. But others contend that the houses would have been destroyed had they not been moved. Further, it was common for wood framed buildings to be moved and many historic houses in the area are not in situ, so this does not necessarily make the buildings less significant.

== Gallery ==
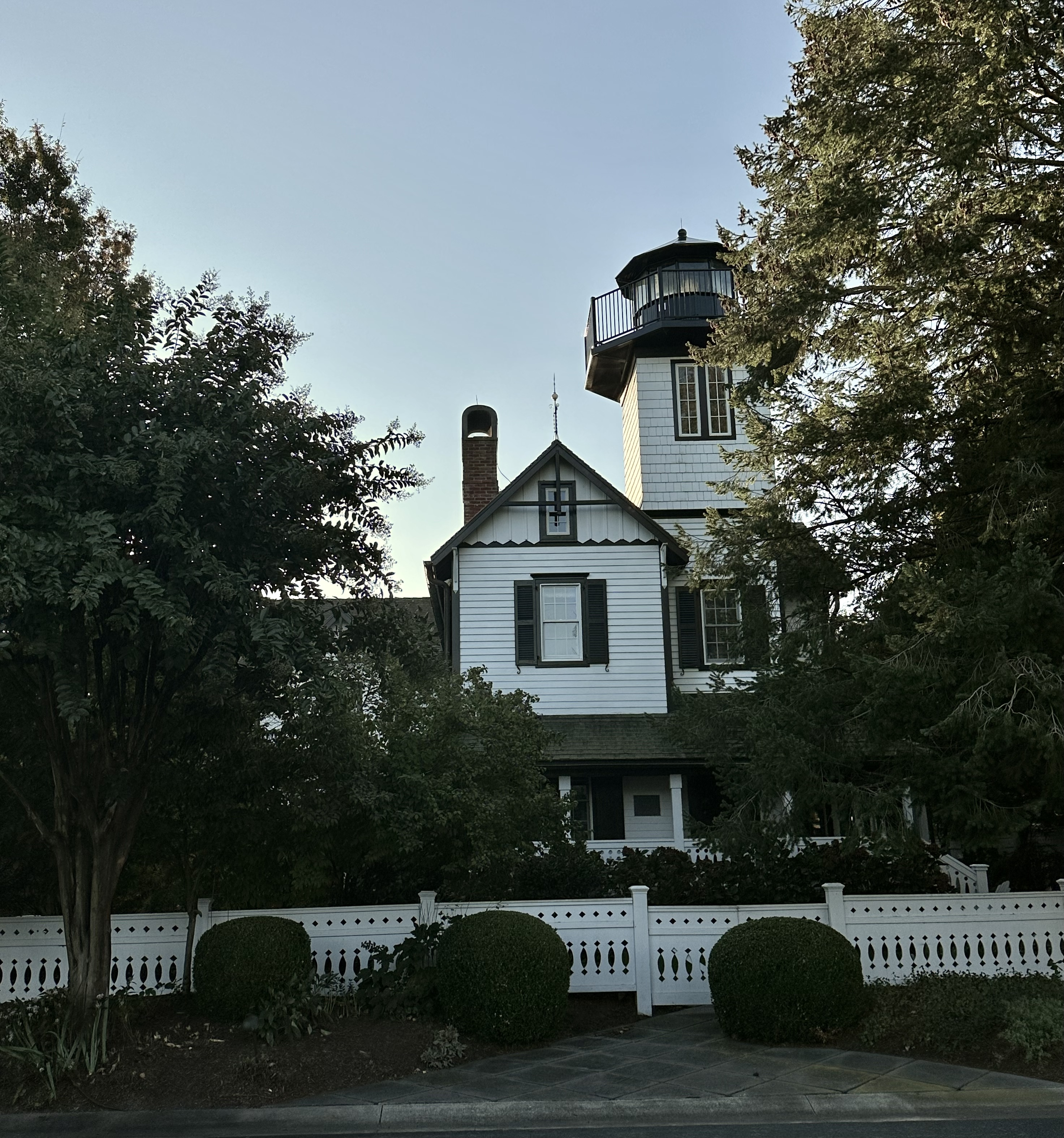
Replica of Mispillion Lighthouse

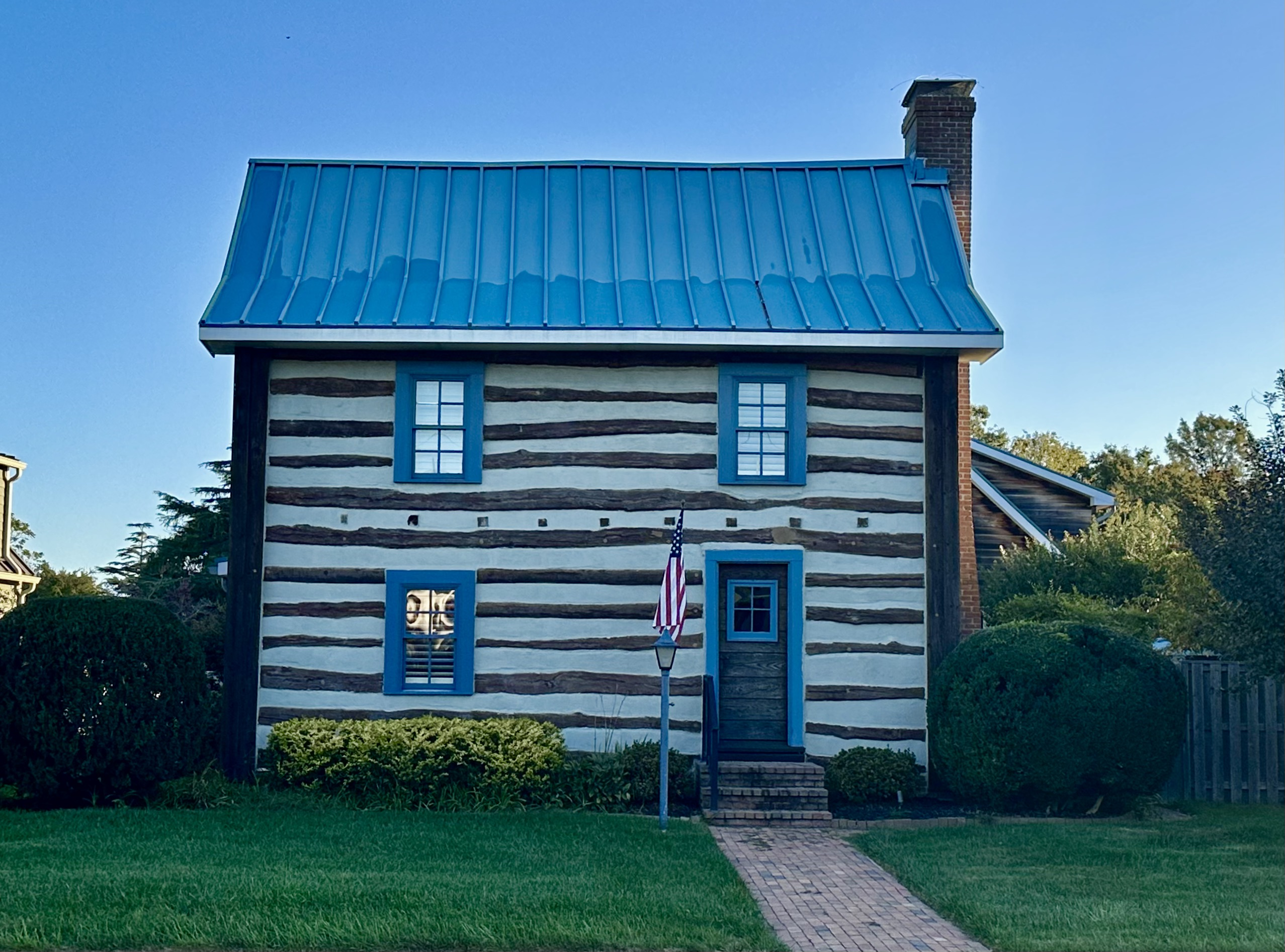
Fourth Street Log House

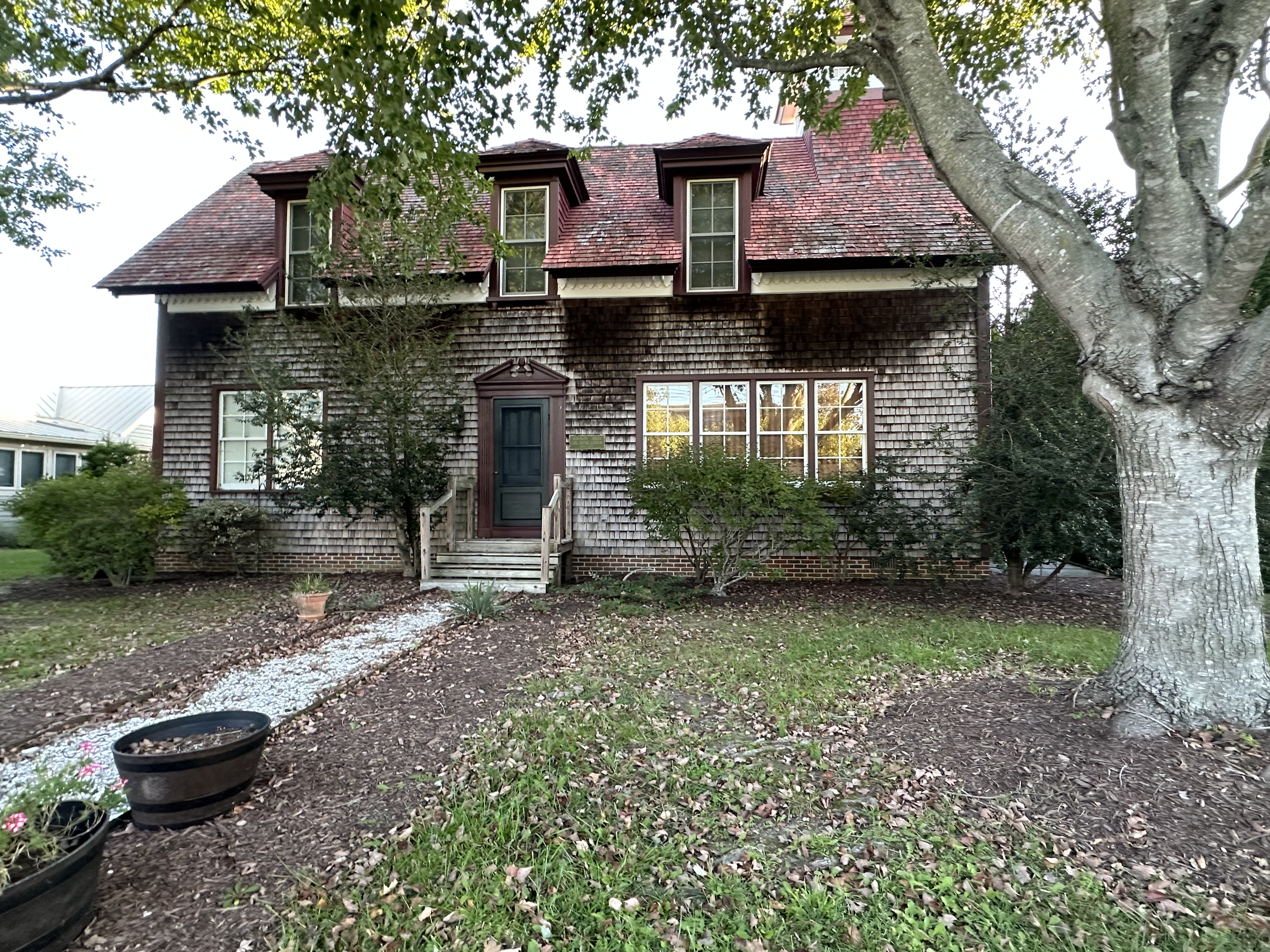
Rehoboth Life Saving Station
