= Silver Lake (Milford, Delaware) =

- Location within Delaware Location within the United States
- Location: Kent County, Delaware Sussex County, Delaware
- Coordinates: 38.91167°N 75.43633°W
- Type: Reservoir
- Surface elevation: 7 feet (2.1 m)

Silver Lake is a privately owned brackish water pond in Milford, Delaware. It is located by the headwaters of the Mispillion River. Haven Lake is adjacent to Silver Lake. U.S. Route 113 travels between the two lakes, crossing the Mispillion River. On the river, there was a milldam established in the late 18th century, which formed Silver Lake. The mill was replaced in the 19th century.
