= Swan Creek (Mispillion River tributary) =

Stream in Delaware, USA

Swan Creek Tributary to Mispillion River
- Location of Swan Creek mouth Swan Creek (Mispillion River tributary) (the United States)

Location
- Country: United States
- State: Delaware
- County: Kent

Physical characteristics
- Source: outlet of Tubmill Pond
  - location: about 0.5 miles south of Lynch Heights, Delaware
  - coordinates: 38°56′32″N 075°25′40″W
  - elevation: 10 ft (3.0 m)
- Mouth: Mispillion River
  - location: New Wharf, Delaware
  - coordinates: 38°56′14″N 075°24′11″W
  - elevation: 0 ft (0 m)
- Length: 1.84 mi (2.96 km)
- Basin size: 5.09 square miles (13.2 km^{2})
- Discharge
  - location: Mispillion River
  - average: 6.41 cu ft/s (0.182 m^{3}/s) at mouth with Mispillion River

Basin features
- Progression: east
- River system: Mispillion River
- Tributaries
  - left: Tubmill Branch
  - right: unnamed tributaries
- Bridges: DE 1, New Wharf Road

Swan Creek is a 1.84 mi (2.96 km) long 2nd order tributary to the Mispillion River in Kent County, Delaware.

== Course ==
Swan Creek is formed at the outlet of Tubmill Pond about 0.5 miles south of Lynch Heights, Delaware. Swan Creek then flows east to meet the Mispillion River at New Wharf, Delaware.

== Watershed ==
Swan Creek drains 5.09 square miles (13.2 km^{2}) of area, receives about 45.7 in/year of precipitation, has a topographic wetness index of 555.50 and is about 8.8% forested.

== See also ==
- List of Delaware rivers

== Maps ==
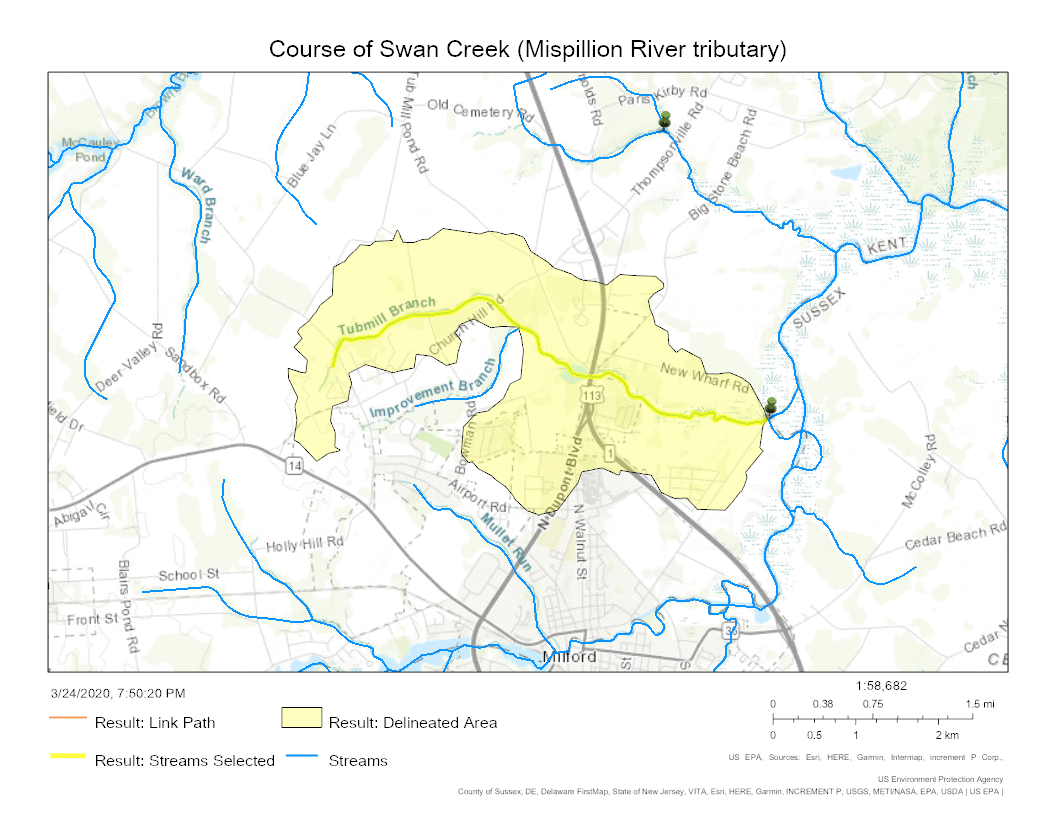
Course of Swan Creek (Mispillion River tributary)

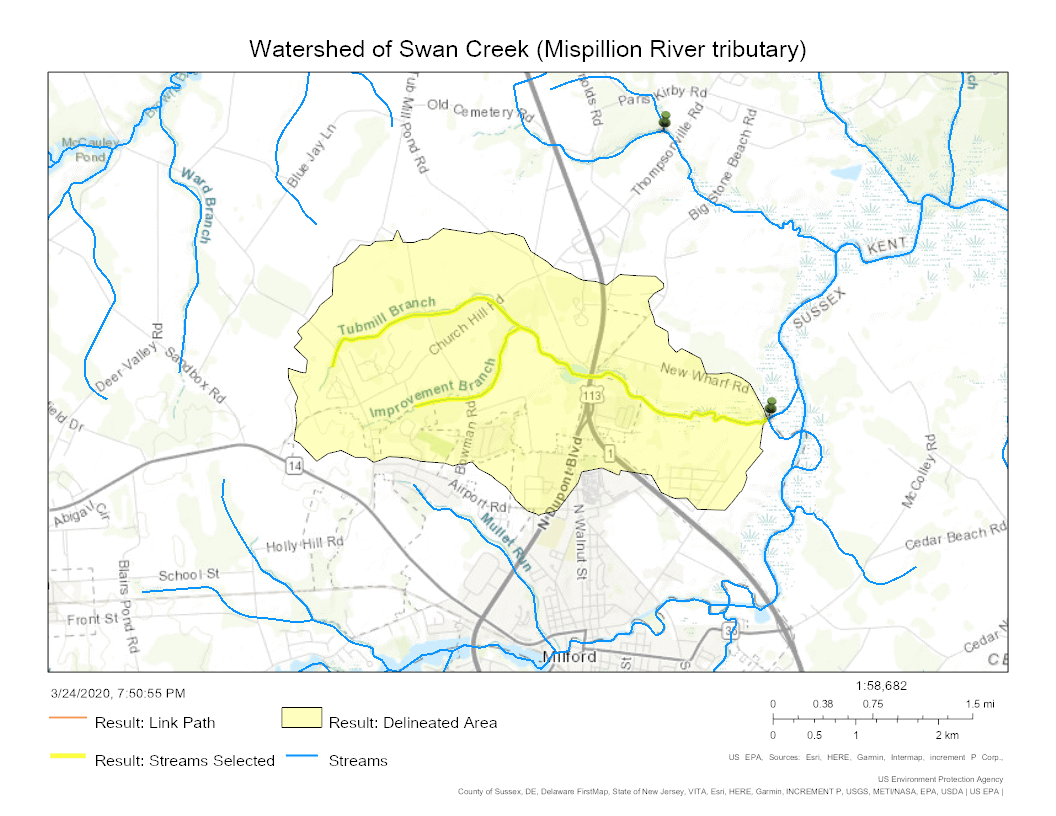
Watershed of Swan Creek (Mispillion River tributary)
