= Haven Lake =

Mill pond at Milford in Delaware, USA

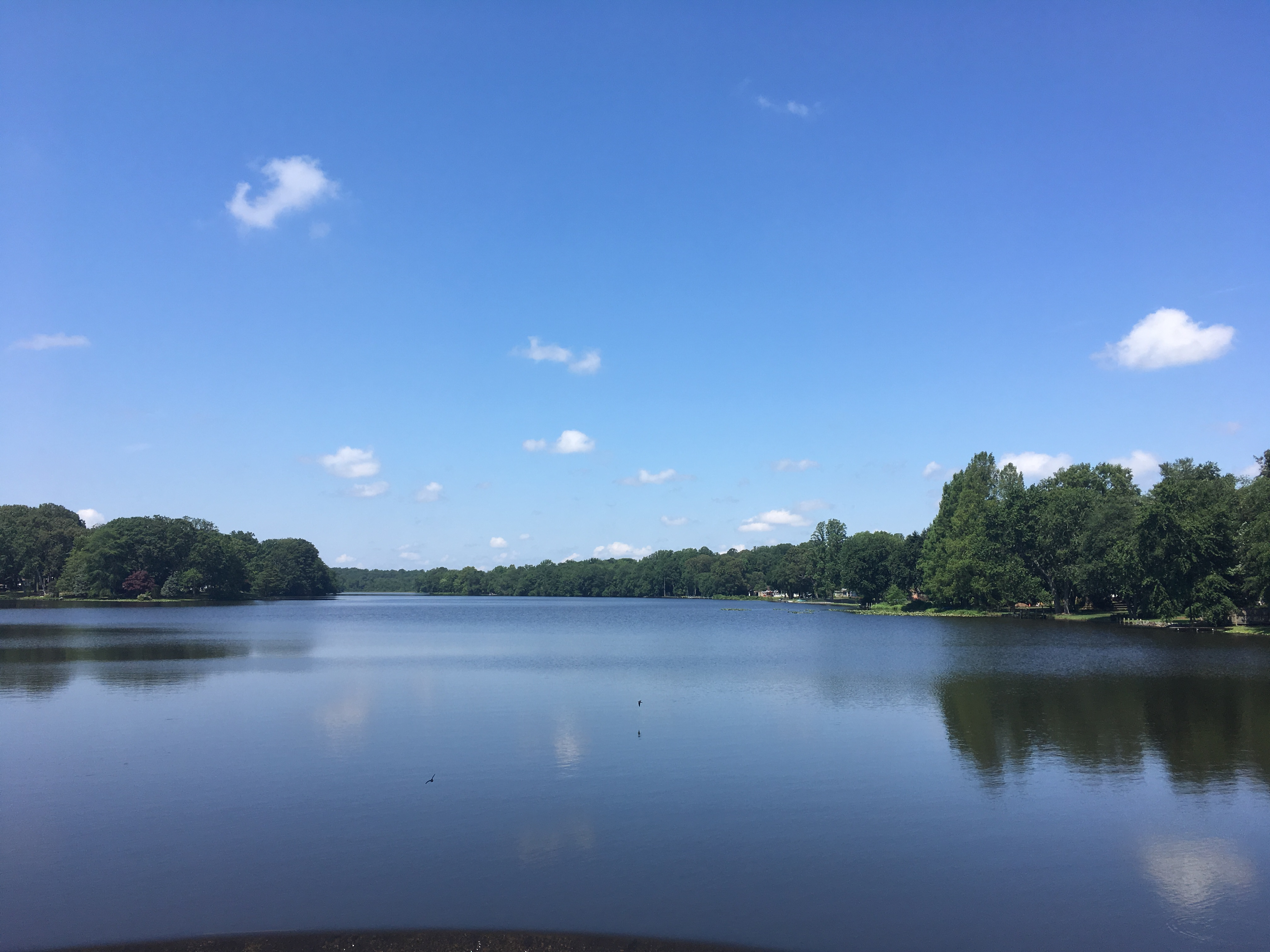
- Haven Lake from dam

- Location within Delaware Location within the United States
- Location: Sussex County and Kent County, Delaware
- Coordinates: 38°54′43″N 75°27′04″W
- Type: Reservoir
- Surface elevation: 13 feet (4.0 m)

Haven Lake is a mill pond formed by an antiquated dam across the source of the Mispillion River in the U.S. state of Delaware. It is located in the city of Milford, where U.S. Route 113 serves as a major highway. Haven Lake is west of U.S. Route 113. The route crosses the Mispillion River, which defines the boundary between Sussex and Kent Counties. Haven Lake is adjacent to Silver Lake.
