= Fishing Branch (Mispillion River tributary) =

Stream in Delaware, USA

Fishing Branch Tributary to Mispillion River
- Location of Fishing Branch mouth Fishing Branch (Mispillion River tributary) (the United States)

Location
- Country: United States
- State: Delaware
- County: Kent

Physical characteristics
- Source: confluence of Parnell Branch and Old Baptist Church Branch
  - location: about 1 mile east of Spring Hill, Delaware
  - coordinates: 38°58′07″N 075°25′01″W
  - elevation: 0 ft (0 m)
- Mouth: Mispillion River
  - location: about 1.5 miles southeast of Harrings Corners, Delaware
  - coordinates: 38°57′20″N 075°23′37″W
  - elevation: 0 ft (0 m)
- Length: 1.90 mi (3.06 km)
- Basin size: 4.73 square miles (12.3 km^{2})
- Discharge
  - location: Mispillion River
  - average: 5.91 cu ft/s (0.167 m^{3}/s) at mouth with Mispillion River

Basin features
- Progression: Mispillion River → Delaware Bay → Atlantic Ocean
- River system: Mispillion River
- Tributaries
  - left: Parnell Branch
  - right: Old Baptist Church Branch
- Bridges: Thompsonville Road, Big Stone Beach Road

Fishing Branch is a 1.90 mi (3.06 km) long 2nd order tributary to the Mispillion River in Kent County, Delaware.

== Variant names ==
According to the Geographic Names Information System, it has also been known historically as:

- Fishing Creek

== Course ==
Fishing Branch forms at the confluence of Parnell Branch and Old Baptist Church Branch about 1 mile east of Spring Hill, Delaware. Fishing Branch then flows southeast to meet the Mispillion River about 1.5 miles southeast of Herrings Corners, Delaware.

== Watershed ==
Fishing Branch drains 4.73 square miles (12.3 km^{2}) of area, receives about 45.5 in/year of precipitation, has a topographic wetness index of 596.10 and is about 8.3% forested.

== See also ==
- List of Delaware rivers
