= Mispillion Light =

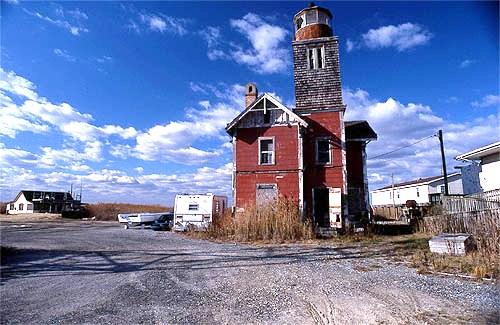
- Mispillion Light
- Location: Sussex County, United States
- Coordinates: 38°56′51″N 75°18′54″W

Tower
- Constructed: 1873
- Construction: wood (artificial physical structure)
- Automated: 1926
- Height: 65 ft (20 m)
- Shape: square
- Heritage: National Register of Historic Places listed place

Light
- First lit: 1873
- Deactivated: 1929
- Lens: sixth order Fresnel lens
- Characteristic: Fl W 3s
- 1929 light
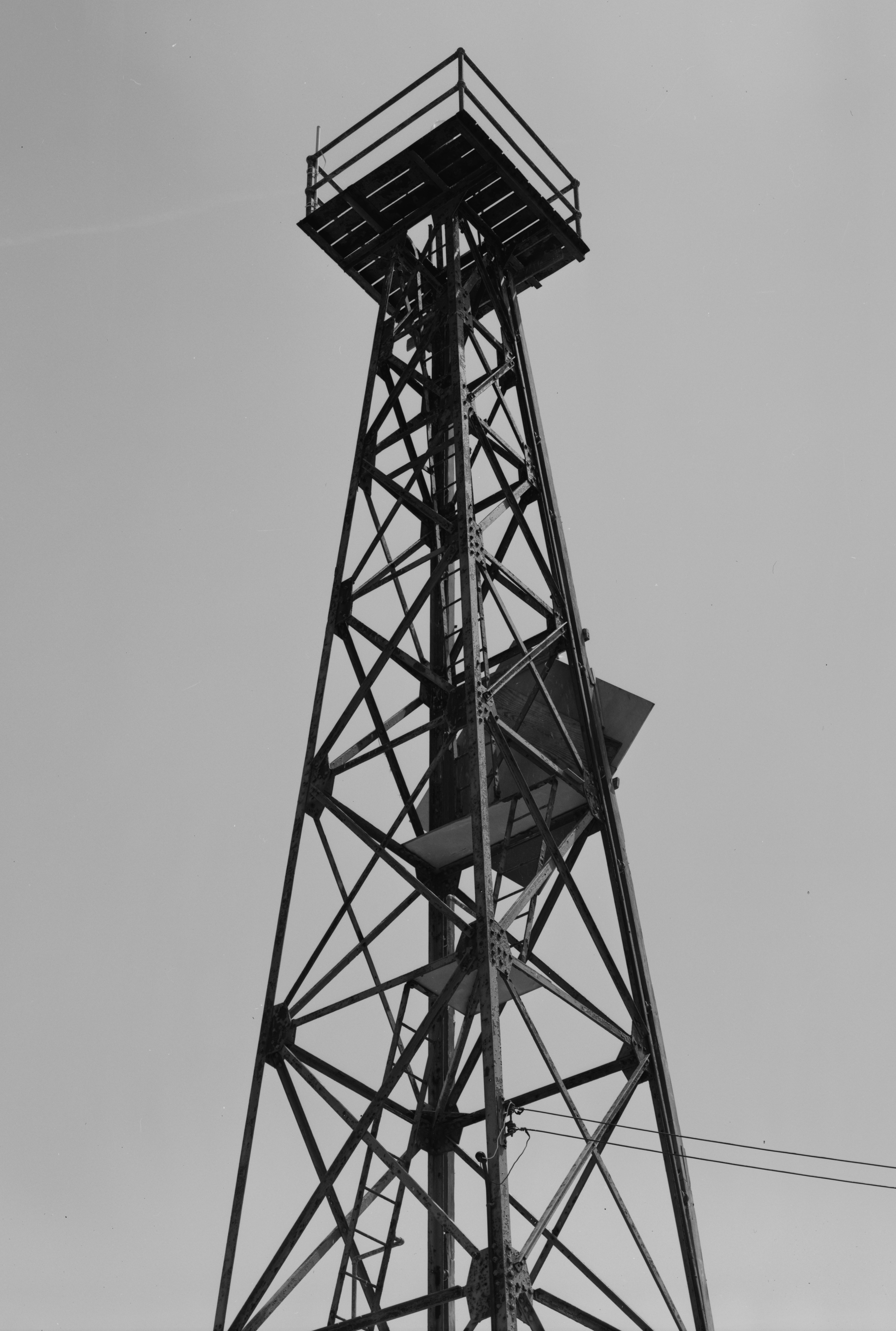
- Beacon tower in 1992
- Construction: steel
- First lit: 1929
- Deactivated: 1984
- Mispillion Lighthouse and Beacon Tower
- U.S. National Register of Historic Places
- Nearest city: Milford, Delaware
- Area: 0.5 acres (0.20 ha)
- Built: 1873
- Architectural style: Gothic Revival, Carpenter Gothic
- NRHP reference No.: 86002919
- Added to NRHP: February 18, 1987

Mispillion Lighthouse is a lighthouse in Delaware, United States, located on the Mispillion River near Delaware Bay.

== History ==
The original Mispillion Lighthouse was built in 1831. The second Mispillion Lighthouse was a 65-foot (20 m) square wood tower rising from one corner of a two-story Gothic style wood keeper's house and was built in 1873. It served until 1929, when it was deactivated and replaced by a steel skeleton tower that had originally served at Cape Henlopen. Over many years of private ownership and neglect, the lighthouse had fallen into an extreme state of disrepair, and was considered by Lighthouse Digest magazine to be "America's Most Endangered Lighthouse". After a fire started by lightning destroyed most of the tower portion of the lighthouse, the remains of the lighthouse were sold in 2002. A replica of the lighthouse was rebuilt at Shipcarpenter Square in Lewes, Delaware, in 2004 using what was left of the structure of the old lighthouse, and based on the original plans. The new owners also made a substantial addition during reconstruction, used as their living quarters. The steel skeletal tower remained at the original location but was neither active nor open to the public until 2008 when the structure was demolished.

It was added to the National Register of Historic Places in 1987.
