= USS Mispillion =

Oiler of the United States Navy

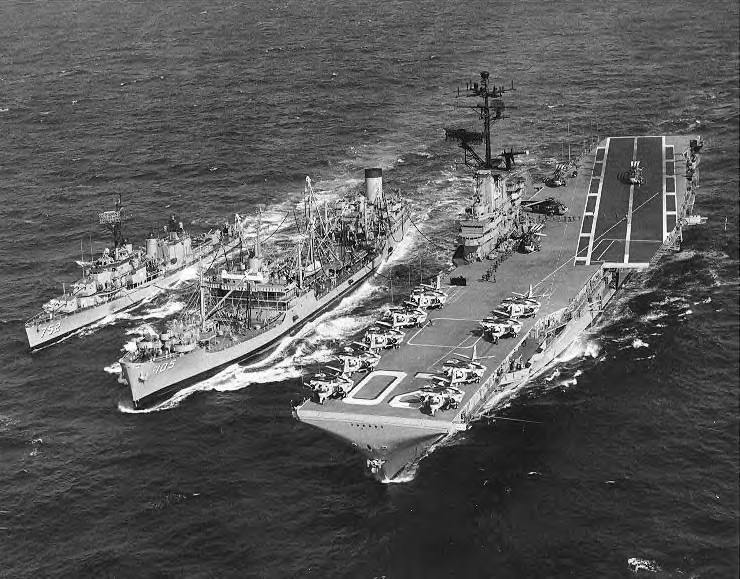
- Mispillion fueling Bennington and Alfred A. Cunningham, 1963

History

United States
- Name: USS Mispillion
- Namesake: Mispillion River
- Builder: Sun Shipbuilding and Drydock Company
- Laid down: 14 February 1945
- Launched: 10 August 1945
- Acquired: 30 November 1945
- Commissioned: 29 December 1945
- Decommissioned: 26 July 1974
- In service: 1975
- Out of service: 1991
- Reclassified: T-AO-105 (1974)
- Stricken: 15 February 1995
- Identification: IMO number: 7737121
- Motto: If we got it, you can have it!
- Honors and awards: Eight battle stars for Korean War service
- Fate: Sold for scrap December 2011

General characteristics
- Class & type: Ashtabula-class oiler
- Displacement: As built: 7,423 tons (light); 25,480 tons (full load); After "jumboization": 12,840 tons (light); 33,987 tons (full load)
- Length: As built: 553 ft (169 m); After "jumboization": 664 ft (202 m)
- Beam: 75 ft (23 m)
- Draft: As built: 32 ft (9.8 m); After "jumboization": 34 ft 9 in (10.59 m)
- Installed power: 30,400 hp (22,700 kW)
- Propulsion: geared turbines, four Babcock & Wilcox 450psi sectional header ("K"-type) boilers, twin screws
- Speed: 16 knots (30 km/h)
- Capacity: 146,000 barrels (23,200 m^{3}) of fuel oil
- Complement: 304 (as USS Mispillion)
- Crew: 108 civilians plus U.S. Navy detachment (as USNS Mispillion)
- Armament: As built: 1 × 5 inch (127 mm) 38-caliber gun; 4 × 3 inch (76.2 mm) 50-caliber guns; 8 × 40 mm antiaircraft guns (4 x 2); 8 × 20 mm antiaircraft guns (4 x 2)
- Notes: "Jumboization" involved the lengthening of Mispillion's hull and installation of additional cargo capacity during 1965–66

USS Mispillion (AO-105) was an Ashtabula-class oiler that served in the United States Navy from 1945 to 1974. She was then transferred to the Military Sealift Command to continue in non-commissioned service as United States Naval Ship USNS Mispillion (T-AO-105), in which capacity she served until 1994. Thus far, Mispillion has been the only U.S. Navy ship to bear the name.

== Construction and commissioning ==
Mispillion was laid down under Maritime Commission contract on 14 February 1945 by Sun Shipbuilding and Drydock Company, Chester, Pennsylvania. She was launched on 10 August 1945, sponsored by Mrs. C. E. Feddeman, acquired by the United States Navy from the Maritime Commission on 30 November 1945, and commissioned on 29 December 1945.

== Operational history, 1946–1965 ==
Mispillion joined Service Force, US Pacific Fleet (ComServPac), on 6 April 1946. Between then and 1950, she alternated on station tanker duty between Qingdao, China; Shanghai, China; Subic Bay, Philippines; and Eniwetok, with shuttle runs between the oil port of Bahrain in the Persian Gulf and various ports in Japan, China, the Philippines, the Marshall Islands, and the Mariana Islands. As station tanker at Eniwetok in 1948, she took part in Operation Sandstone, an atomic bomb test. In 1949 she performed cold-weather operations off the Territory of Alaska.

With the outbreak of the Korean War, Mispillion joined Task Force 90. During her first combat tour, she provided logistic support for the huge invasion force that landed United Nations forces at Inchon on 15 September 1950, then rounded the Korean Peninsula to support the forces operating in the Wonsan area. After a brief respite on the United States west coast in the autumn of 1951, she returned in November 1951 for a second combat tour. She continued to support United Nations naval forces as they enforced a continuous blockade of the North Korean coast, rendered gunfire support to United Nations ground forces, and bombarded Communist supply areas, troop concentrations, and transportation centers.

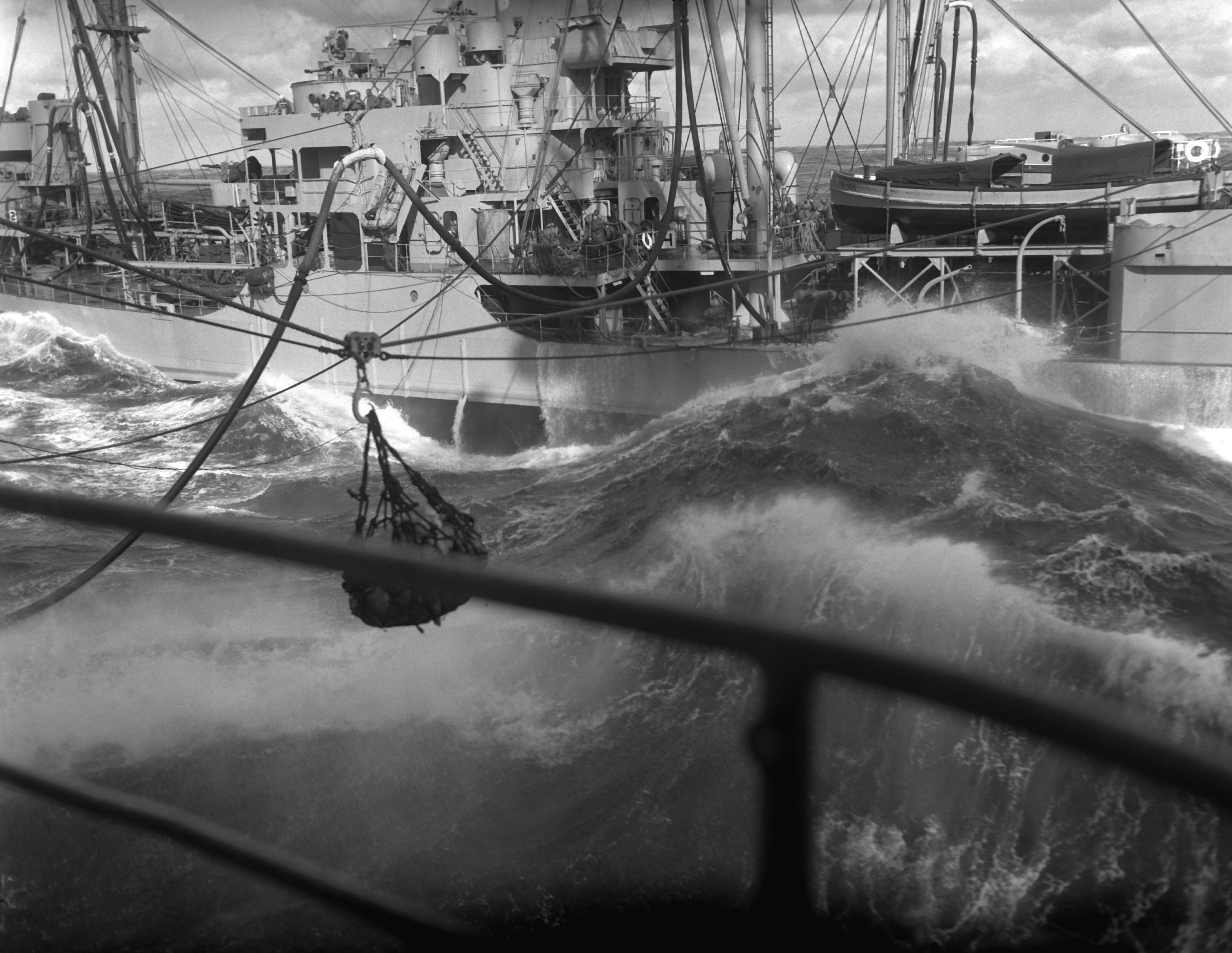
Mispillion fueling the aircraft carrier Kearsarge off Korea, 1952

Operating in both the Yellow Sea and the Sea of Japan, Mispillion also supported the aircraft carriers of Task Force 77, providing aviation gasoline and fuel oil for the ships. Returning to the United States west coast in August 1952, she got underway again in September 1952 for another nine-month Western Pacific tour with the United States Seventh Fleet. Although she operated primarily in the Korean combat area during each of the above tours, she spent at least one month each time as a station tanker at Kaohsiung, Taiwan, supporting the Taiwan Straits patrol. Mispillion received eight battle stars for her Korean War service.

Between 1953 and 1964 Mispillion alternated Western Pacific and United States west coast duty with yard periods in between. Participating in various exercises, she joined in Operation Redwing, her second atomic bomb test, in the Marshall Islands in 1956.

== "Jumboization", 1965–1966 ==
On 16 April 1965 Mispillion was placed in commission in reserve as she prepared for a prolonged "jumboization" conversion and overhaul, begun at Toledo, Ohio, in April 1965, and completed at Boston, Massachusetts, in August 1966. With an increased capacity of over 93,000 barrels (14,800 m^{3}), an added length of almost 100 feet (30 m), and over 50 additional crew members, in addition to modern equipment, Mispillion departed Boston on 6 September 1966 to return to her home port at Long Beach, California.

== Operational history, 1967–1994 ==
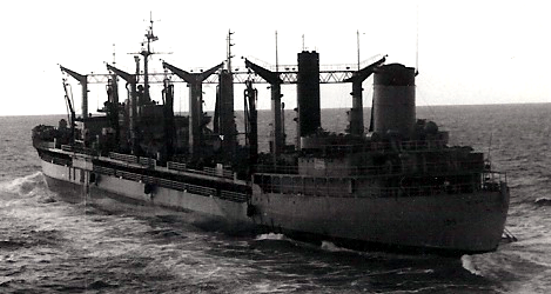
Approaching Mispillion for a dawn refueling in the western Pacific during the autumn of 1970

In April 1967 Mispillion got underway for her first Western Pacific deployment since 1964. Arriving at Subic Bay, Philippine Islands, on 22 April 1967, she began a seven-month cruise refueling aircraft carriers and gunfire support ships of the Seventh Fleet operating in the Vietnam area during the Vietnam War. Servicing in particular the ships of Yankee Station, she transferred over 71 million US gallons (270,000 m^{3}) of fuel before returning to Long Beach on 30 November 1967. Cruising United States West Coast and Hawaiian waters for the next five months, she conducted coastal operations and exercises in preparation for departing on 11 May 1968 to serve with the Seventh Fleet through the remainder of 1968. From February 1968 to December 1972, she was in the West Pacific Ocean near Viet Nam. In April 1973, she was moved to the Indian Ocean crossing the equator on 4th April. From October 1973 to January 1974, she was in the South China Sea and in the Bandar Abbas Iran for a brief period in February 1974. She was moved back to the Indian Ocean in the same month.

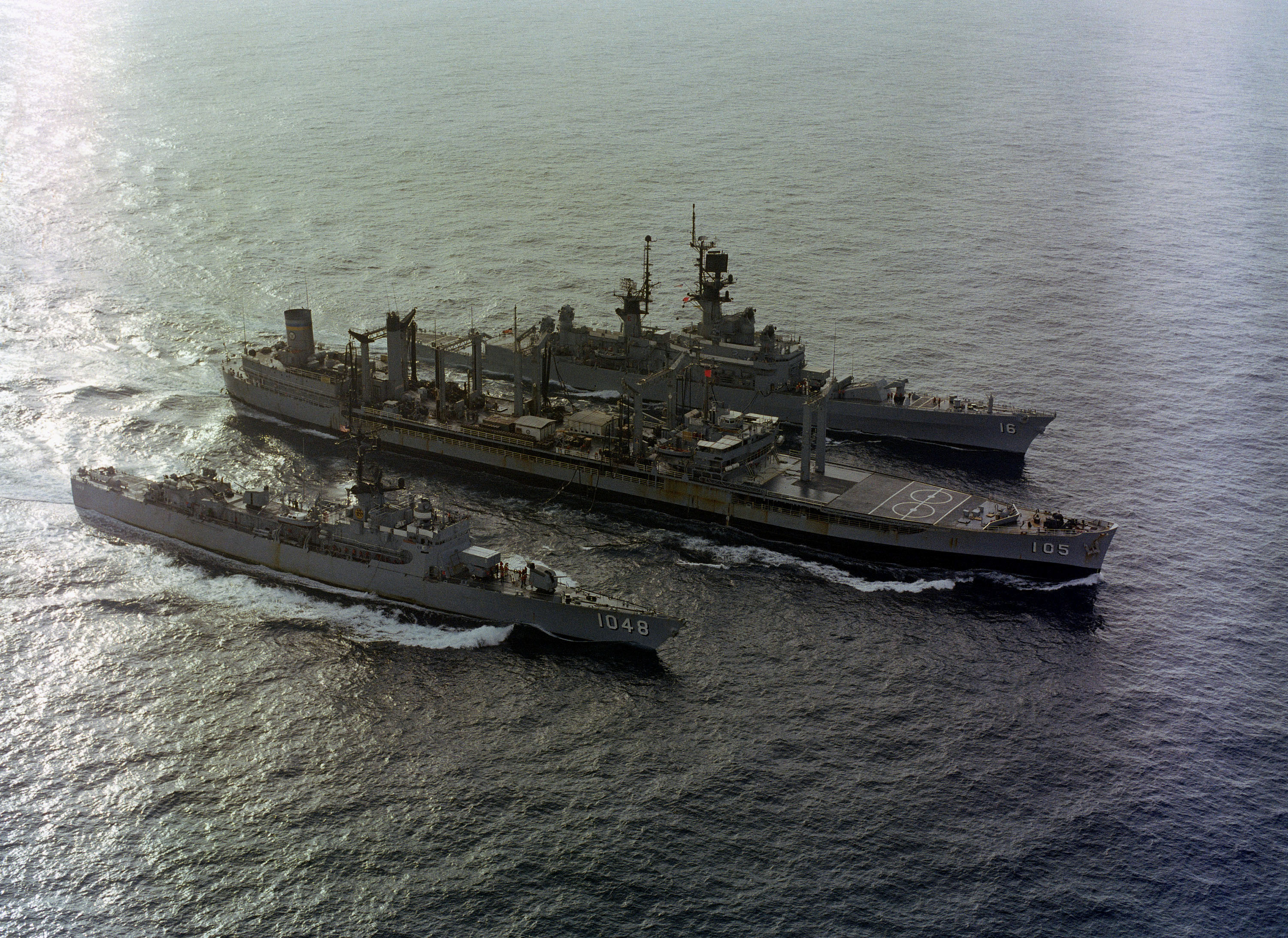
The jumboized USNS Mispillion refueling USS Leahy (CG-16) and USS Sample (FF-1048), 1980

Mispillion was decommissioned on 26 July 1974 and transferred to the Military Sealift Command, where she continued in non-commissioned U.S. Navy service with a civilian crew as United States Naval Ship USNS Mispillion (T-AO-105), entering service as such in 1975.

On 10 January 1982, during a routine fuel transfer in the Indian Ocean, Mispillion collided with the United States Navy-contracted tanker Texas Trader. Both ships suffered minor damage, but no injuries were reported.

Mispillion continued to serve with the MSC until 1994. She was struck from the Naval Register on 15 February 1995 and her title was transferred to the United States Maritime Administration (MARAD) on 1 May 1999 for lay-up in the National Defense Reserve Fleet at Suisun Bay, Benicia, California.

== Disposal ==
Mispillion was sold for scrapping in early December 2011 and in early January 2012 was moved to Mare Island Naval Shipyard in Vallejo, California, where she was placed in drydock to be prepared for her last voyage to the scrapyard in Brownsville, Texas. She began her voyage to Brownsville on 27 January 2012, and transited the Panama Canal from the Pacific Ocean to the Caribbean Sea between 21 and 22 February 2012. On 4 March 2012, she arrived at ESCO Marine in Brownsville to be scrapped. She was 67 years old, had the longest life overall and longest working life of any Cimarron-class oiler, and was the last World War II-built oiler in existence.
