= Mispillion River =

River in United States of America

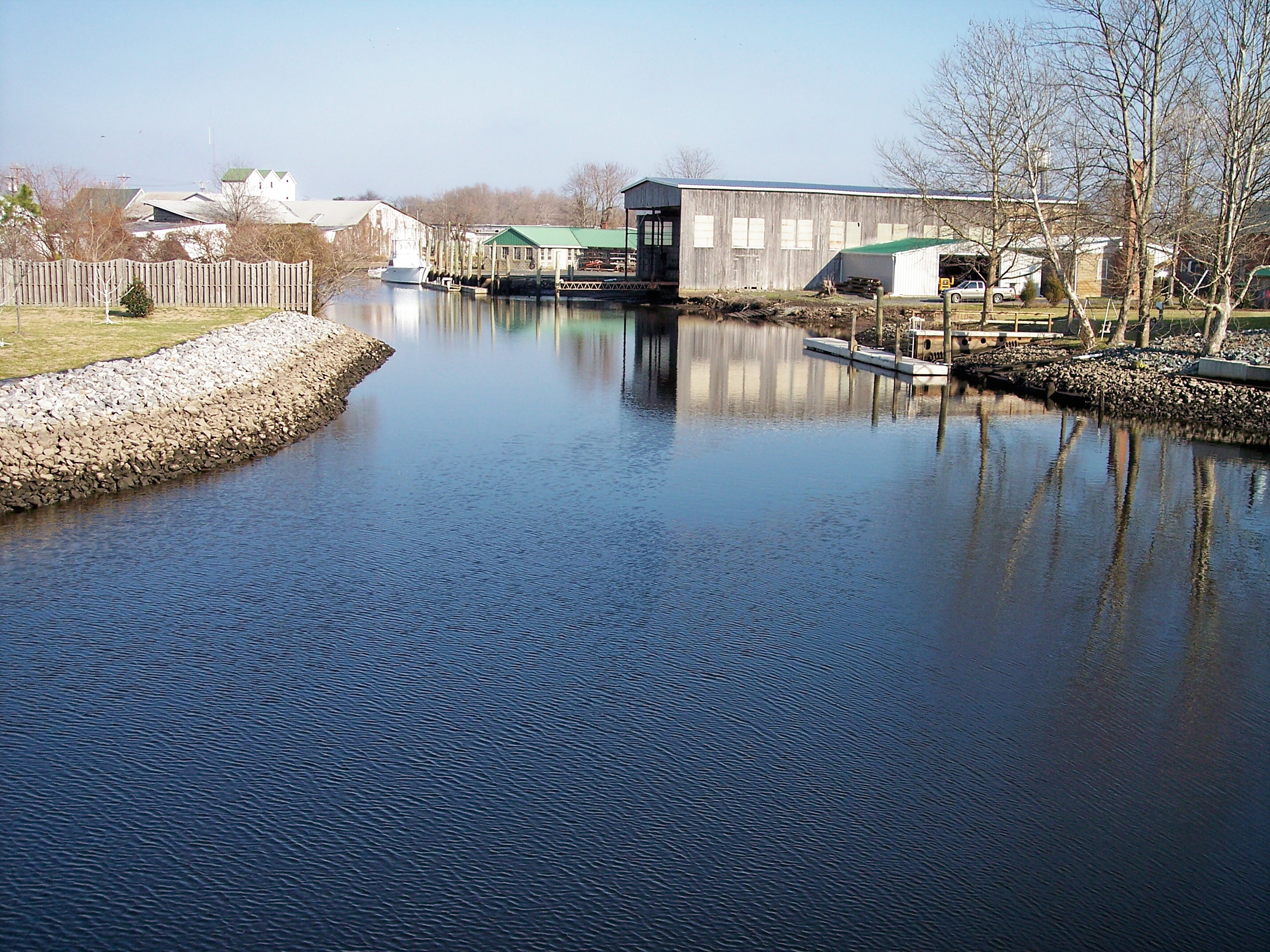
- The Mispillion River in Milford in 2006

- Location of the mouth of the Mispillion River

Location
- Country: United States
- State: Delaware
- Counties: Kent; Sussex

Physical characteristics
- Source: confluence of Beaverdam and Tantrough Branches at Blairs Pond
  - location: near Milford
  - coordinates: 38°52′53″N 75°30′00″W
  - elevation: 29 ft (8.8 m)
- Mouth: Delaware Bay
  - location: near Mispillion Light
  - coordinates: 38°57′05″N 75°18′48″W
  - elevation: 0 ft (0 m)
- Length: 15 mi (24 km)approximately
- Basin size: 76 sq mi (200 km^{2})
- Discharge
  - average: 91.77 cu ft/s (2.599 m^{3}/s) at mouth with Delaware Bay

Basin features
- Progression: Delaware Bay → Atlantic Ocean
- River system: Delaware Bay
- Tributaries
  - left: Beaverdam Branch; Lednum Branch; Mullet Run; Swan Creek; Fishing Branch; Beaverdam Branch; Kings Causeway Branch; Crooked Gut
  - right: Tantrough Branch; Johnson Branch; Bowman Branch; Deep Branch
- Waterbodies: Blairs Pond; Griffith Lake; Haven Lake; Silver Lake

The Mispillion River is a river flowing to Delaware Bay in southern Delaware in the United States. It is approximately 15 miles (24 km) long and drains an area of 76 square miles (200 km^{2}) on the Atlantic Coastal Plain.

It rises in northern Sussex County, approximately 3 miles (4.8 km) southwest of Milford, and flows generally east-northeastwardly, defining the boundary between Sussex and Kent counties; it passes through the center of Milford on its course to its mouth at Delaware Bay, 16 miles (26 km) northwest of Cape Henlopen. The lower 12 miles (19 km) of the river are considered by the U.S. Army Corps of Engineers to be navigable.

A boardwalk known as the Mispillion Riverwalk follows the river in Milford. As of 2003, an effort was underway to preserve a greenway along the river upstream and downstream of Milford.

== Variant names and spellings ==
According to the Geographic Names Information System, the Mispillion River has also been known historically as:

- Masphilion Creek
- Maspillon Creek
- Mispalling Creek
- Mispelion Creek
- Mispelon Creek
- Mispening Creek
- Miss Pinion River
- Mispeninge Creek
- Misperange River
- Mispilian Creek
- Mispliant Creek
- Misspann Creek
- Muskmellon Creek
- Musmillion River
- Musphilion Creek
- Muspilion Creek

== Name origin ==
"The first occurrence of this name (of the river) is in the form Mispening on a map of 1664, tentatively analyzed as meaning "as the great tuber (stream);" (Dunlap and Weslager, 1950)

== See also ==
- List of Delaware rivers
- Mispillion Light
- USS Mispillion (AO-105)
- USNS Mispillion (T-AO-105)
