= Fork Branch (St. Jones River tributary) =

River in Kent County, Delaware

Fork Branch Tributary to St. Jones River
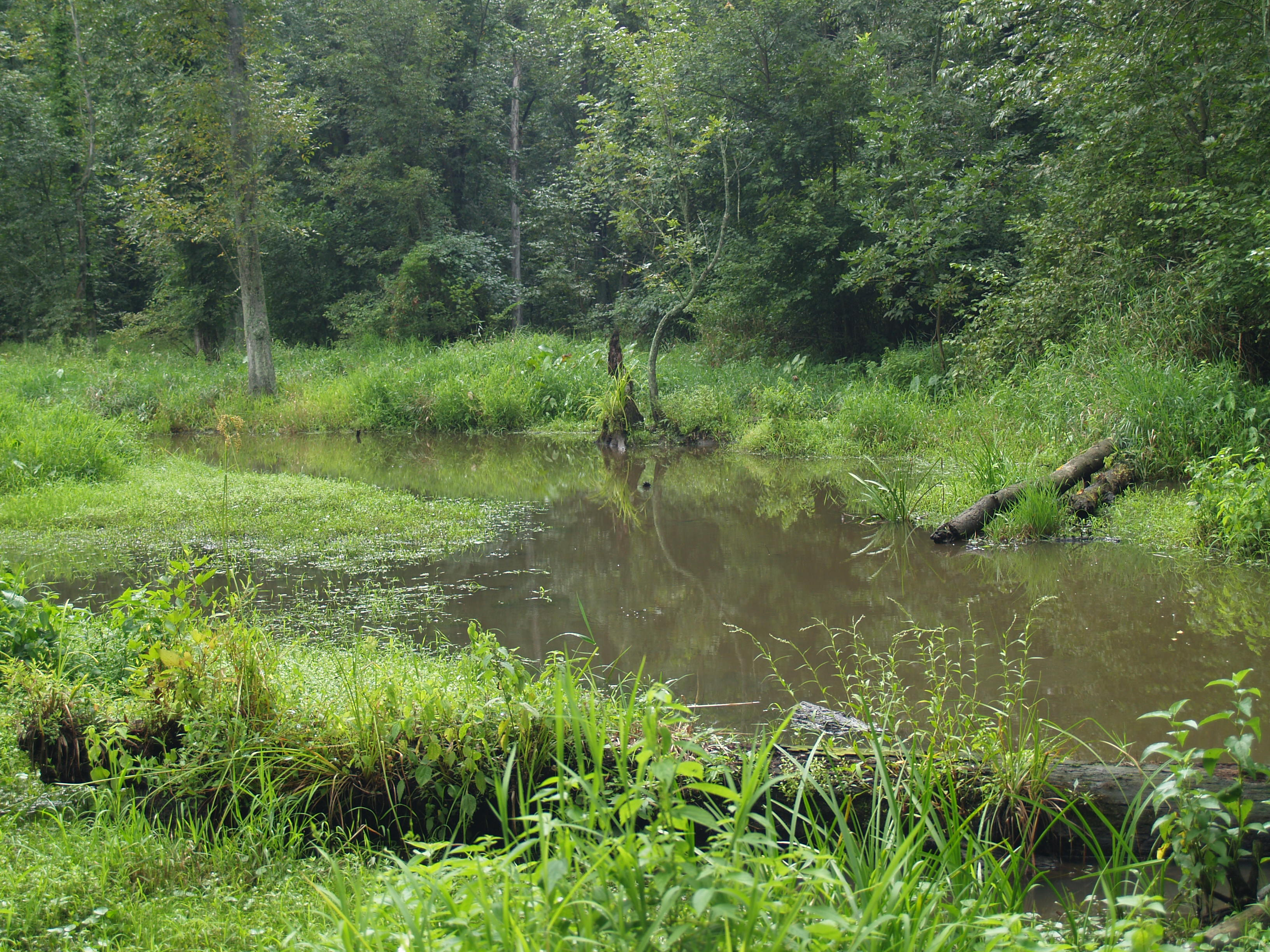
- Fork Branch in Dover, Delaware

- Location within Delaware Location within the United States

Location
- Country: United States
- State: Delaware
- County: Kent
- City: Dover

Physical characteristics
- Source: Pinks Branch and Jordan Branch divides
  - location: about 0.1 miles west of Seeneytown, Delaware
  - coordinates: 39°11′47″N 075°39′42″W
  - elevation: 70 ft (21 m)
- Mouth: St. Jones River
  - location: Silver Lake in Dover, Delaware
  - coordinates: 39°10′57″N 075°32′55″W
  - elevation: 14 ft (4.3 m)
- Length: 9.48 mi (15.26 km)
- Basin size: 30.64 square miles (79.4 km^{2})
- Discharge
  - average: 37.81 cu ft/s (1.071 m^{3}/s) at mouth with Fork Branch

Basin features
- Progression: St. Jones River → Delaware Bay → Atlantic Ocean
- River system: St. Jones River
- Tributaries
  - left: Maidstone Branch; McKees Run
  - right: unnamed tributaries
- Bridges: Shaws Corner Road, Rose Dale Lane, Pearsons Corner Road, Kenton Road, McKee Road, W Denny Road, Scarborough Road, College Road, North State Street

Fork Branch is a 9.48 mi (15.26 km) long 3rd order tributary to the St. Jones River in Kent County, Delaware.

== Variant names ==
According to the Geographic Names Information System, it has also been known historically as:

- Cranbrook River
- Downs Branch
- Fisher Branch
- Warge Kijhlen
- Wulfs Creek

== Course ==
Fork Branch rises on the Pinks Branch and Jordan Branch divide about 0.1 miles west of Seeneytown, Delaware.

== Watershed ==
Fork Branch drains 30.64 square miles (79.4 km^{2}) of area, receives about 44.8 in/year of precipitation, has a topographic wetness index of 654.31 and is about 10.5% forested.

== See also ==
- List of rivers of Delaware

== Maps ==
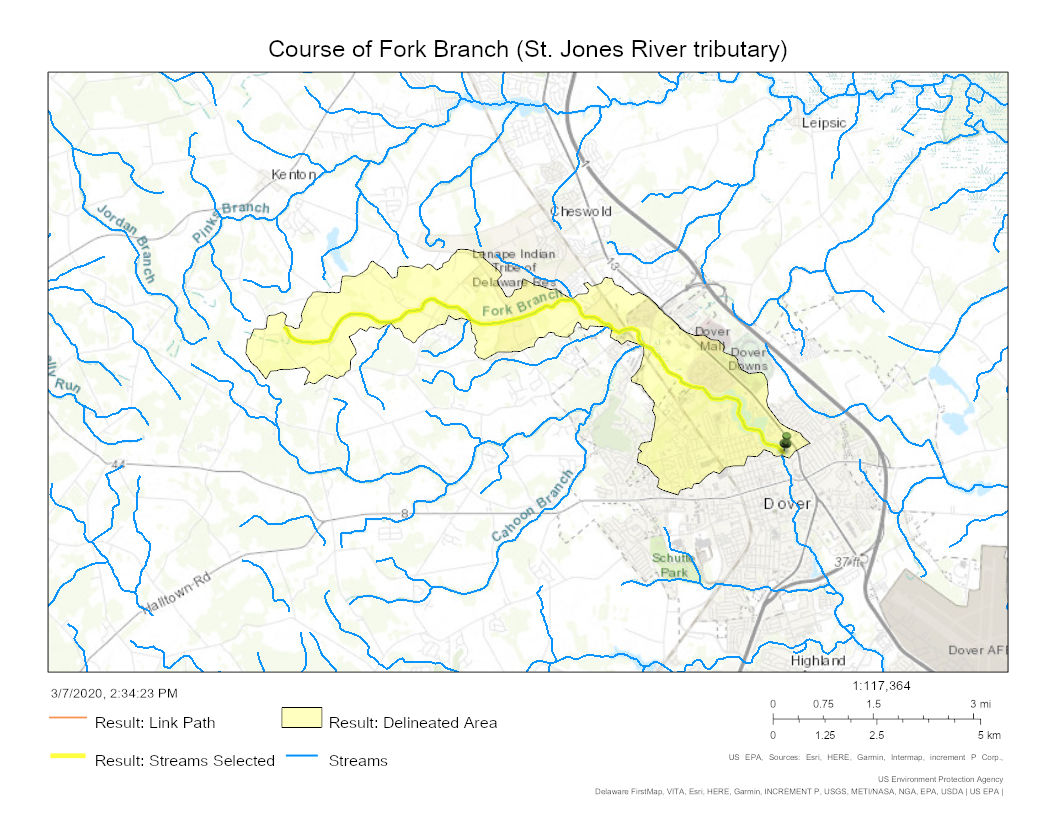
Fork Branch (St. Jones River tributary)

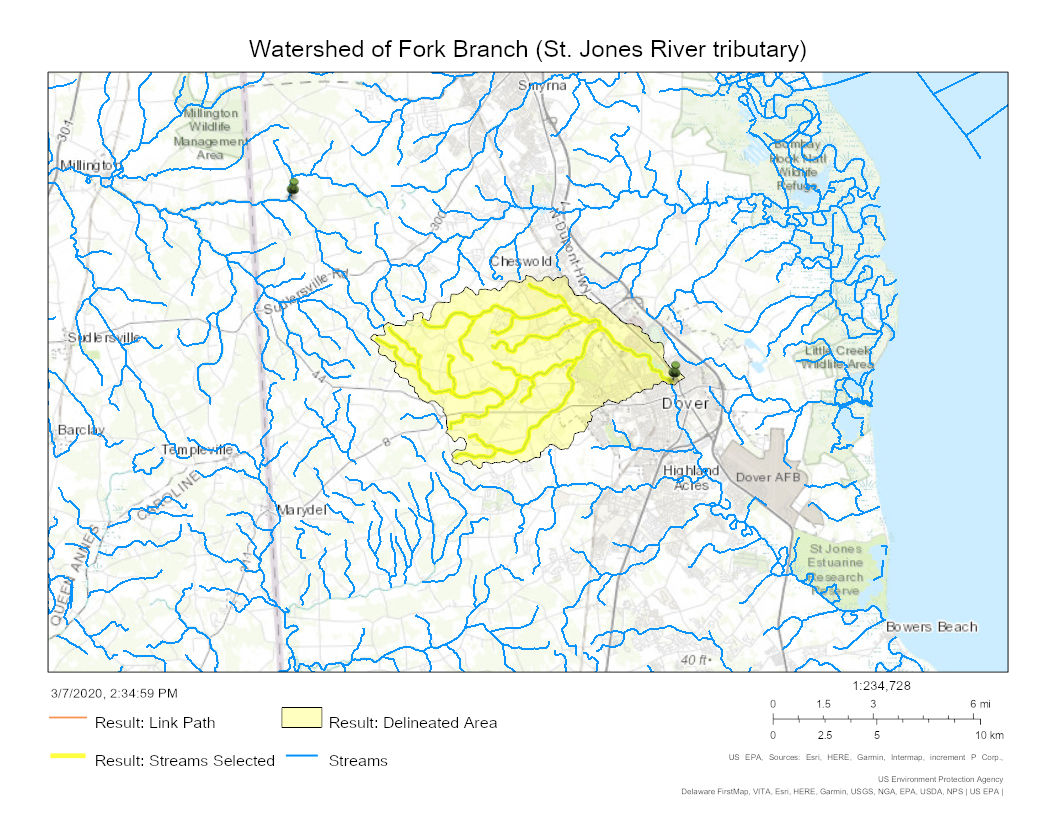
Watershed of Fork Branch (St. Jones River tributary)
