= Sewell Branch (Andover Branch tributary) =

Sewell Branch Tributary to Andover Branch
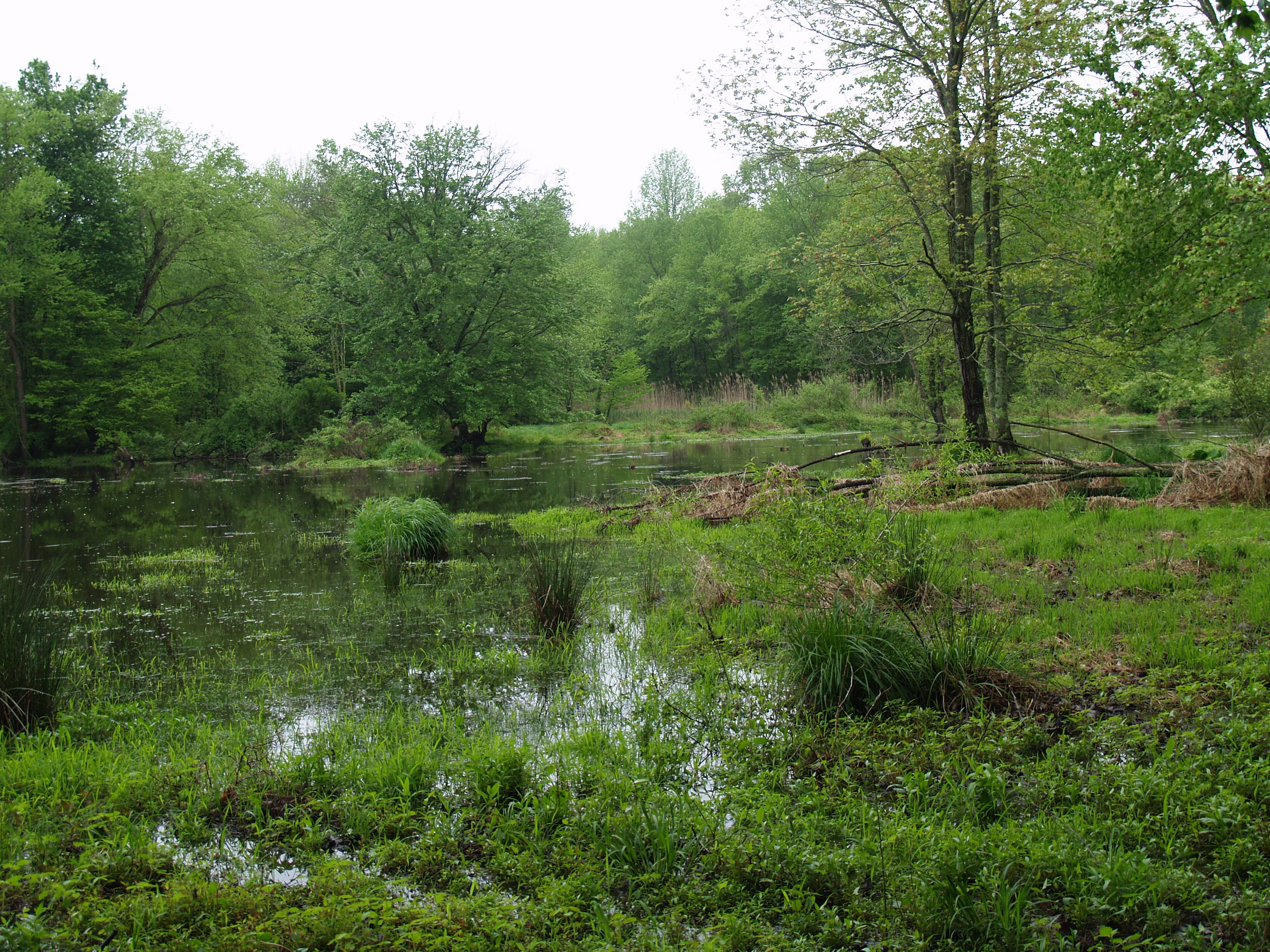
- Sewell Branch at Delaware-Maryland Stateline

- Location within Maryland Location within the United States

Location
- Country: United States
- State: Maryland; Delaware
- County: Kent (MD); Queen Annes (MD); Kent (DE)

Physical characteristics
- Source: Pinks Branch divide
  - location: Underwood Corner, Delaware
  - coordinates: 39°14′28″N 075°40′51″W
  - elevation: 70 ft (21 m)
- Mouth: Andover Branch
  - location: about 1 mile southeast of Peacock Corners, Maryland
  - coordinates: 39°14′30″N 075°47′43″W
  - elevation: 20 ft (6.1 m)
- Length: 7.93 mi (12.76 km)
- Basin size: 17.49 square miles (45.3 km^{2})
- Discharge
  - average: 21.27 cu ft/s (0.602 m^{3}/s) at mouth with Sewell Branch

Basin features
- Progression: generally west
- River system: Chester River
- Tributaries
  - left: Jordan Branch; Blanco Ditch
  - right: unnamed tributaries
- Bridges: DE 42, Sudlers Row, Blackiston Church Road, Sewell Branch Road

Sewell Branch is a 7.93 mi (12.76 km) long 3rd order tributary to Andover Branch in Kent and Queen Annes Counties, Maryland. In Maryland, Sewell Branch forms the boundary in part of Kent and Queen Annes Counties.

== Variant names ==
According to the Geographic Names Information System, it has also been known historically as:

- Mill Branch
- Sewells Branch
- Wiccomis Branch
- Wickomis Branch

== Course ==
Sewell Branch rises on the Pinks Branch divide at Underwood Corner, Delaware. Sewell Branch then flows westerly into Maryland to meet Andover Branch about 1 mile southeast of Peacock Corners, Maryland.

== Watershed ==
Sewell Branch drains 17.49 square miles (45.3 km^{2}) of area, receives about 44.7 in/year of precipitation, has a topographic wetness index of 673.20 and is about 6.8% forested.

== See also ==
- List of rivers of Delaware

== Additional images ==
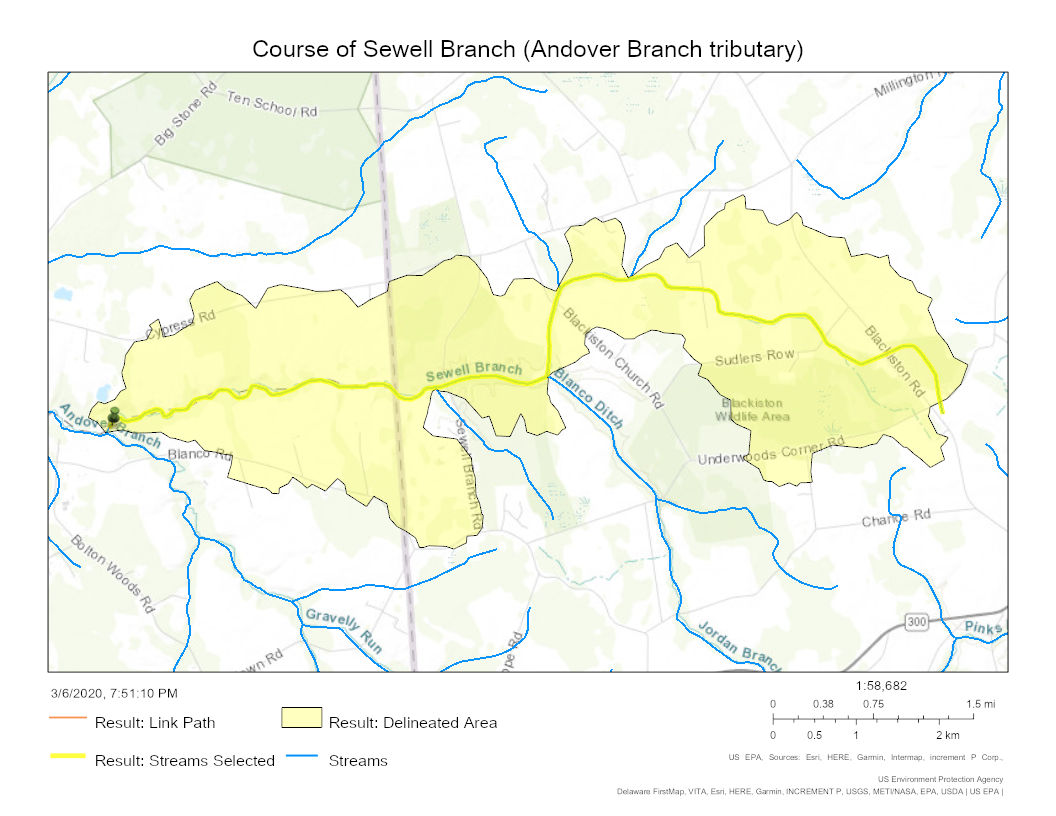
Course of Sewell Branch (Andover Branch tributary)

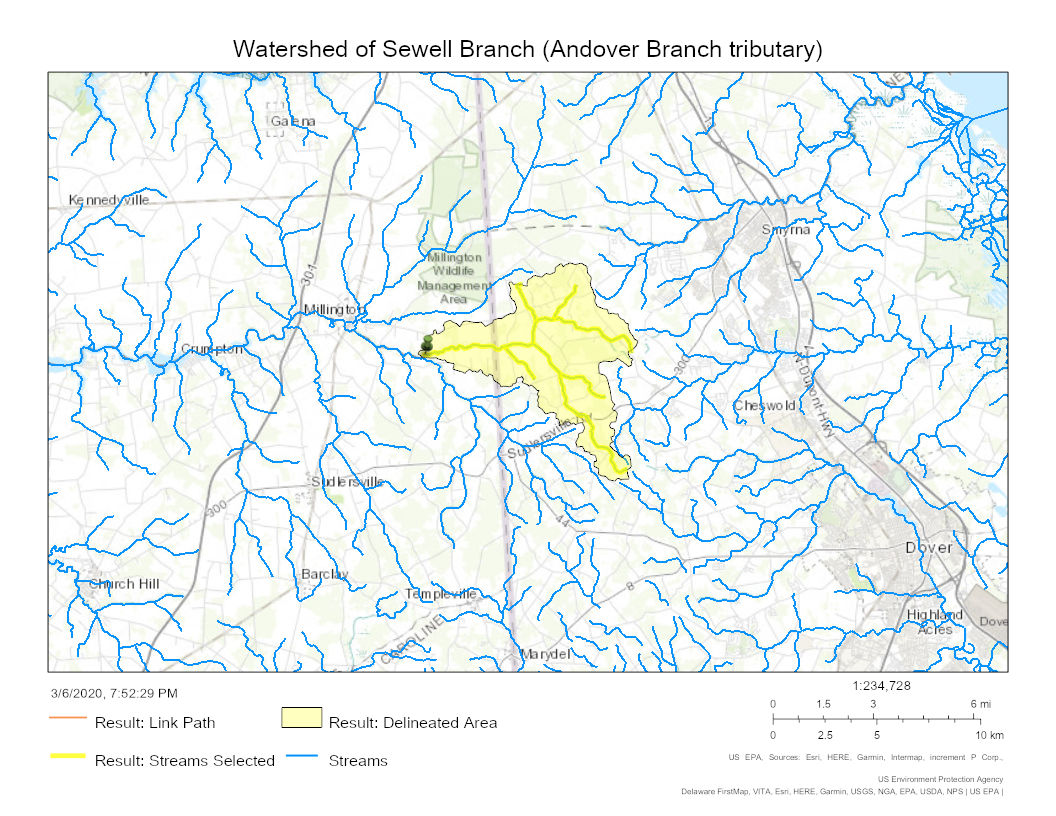
Watershed of Sewell Branch (Andover Branch tributary)
