= Blanco Ditch =

Kent County, Delaware tributary of Sewell Branch

Blanco Ditch Tributary to Sewell Branch
- Location within Delaware Location within the United States

Location
- Country: United States
- State: Delaware
- County: Kent

Physical characteristics
- Source: Jordan Branch divide
  - location: about 0.5 miles east of Pearsons Grove, Delaware
  - coordinates: 39°13′49″N 075°44′03″W
  - elevation: 67 ft (20 m)
- Mouth: Sewell Branch
  - location: about 1.5 miles north of Pearsons Grove, Delaware
  - coordinates: 39°14′46″N 075°45′01″W
  - elevation: 39 ft (12 m)
- Length: 1.40 mi (2.25 km)
- Basin size: 0.75 square miles (1.9 km^{2})
- Discharge
  - average: 0.92 cu ft/s (0.026 m^{3}/s) at mouth with Blanco Ditch

Basin features
- Progression: northwest
- River system: Chester River
- Tributaries
  - left: unnamed tributaries
  - right: unnamed tributaries
- Bridges: Sewell Branch Road

Blanco Ditch is a 1.40 mi (2.25 km) long 1st order tributary to Sewell Branch in Kent County, Delaware.

== Course ==
Blanco Ditch rises on the Jordan Branch divide about 0.5 miles east of Pearsons Grove, Delaware.

== Watershed ==
Blanco Ditch drains 0.75 square miles (1.9 km^{2}) of area, receives about 44.7 in/year of precipitation, has a topographic wetness index of 650.47 and is about 3.9% forested.

== See also ==
- List of rivers of Delaware
