= Jordan Branch (Sewell Branch tributary) =

Jordan Branch Tributary to Sewell Branch
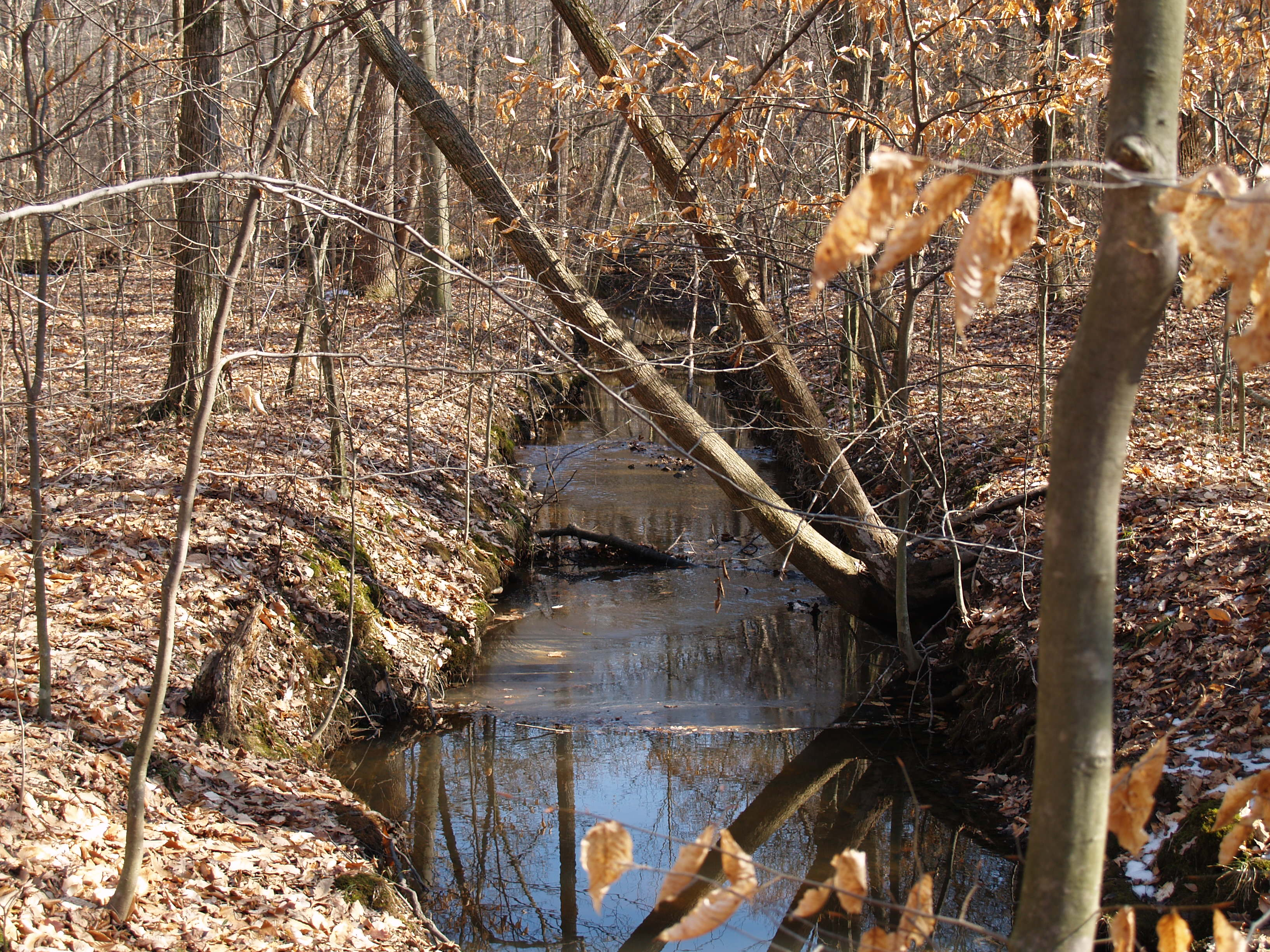
- Jordan Branch in Blackiston Wildlife Area

- Location within Delaware Location within the United States

Location
- Country: United States
- State: Delaware
- County: Kent

Physical characteristics
- Source: Island Pond Marsh Ditch divide
  - location: about 0.1 miles east of Fords Corner, Delaware
  - coordinates: 39°11′31″N 075°41′36″W
  - elevation: 72 ft (22 m)
- Mouth: Sewell Branch
  - location: about 2 miles northeast of Pearsons Grove, Delaware
  - coordinates: 39°14′49″N 075°43′56″W
  - elevation: 49 ft (15 m)
- Length: 5.41 mi (8.71 km)
- Basin size: 6.04 square miles (15.6 km^{2})
- Discharge
  - average: 7.35 cu ft/s (0.208 m^{3}/s) at mouth with Jordan Branch

Basin features
- Progression: northwest
- River system: Chester River
- Tributaries
  - left: unnamed tributaries
  - right: unnamed tributaries
- Bridges: DE 11, DE 300, Chance Road, Underwoods Corner Road

Jordan Branch is a 5.41 mi (8.71 km) long 2nd order tributary to Sewell Branch in Kent County, Delaware.

== Course ==
Jordan Branch rises on the Island Pond Marsh Ditch divide about 0.1 miles east of Fords Corner, Delaware.

== Watershed ==
Jordan Branch drains 6.04 square miles (15.6 km^{2}) of area, receives about 44.7 in/year of precipitation, has a topographic wetness index of 727.94 and is about 6.6% forested.

== See also ==
- List of rivers of Delaware

== Maps ==
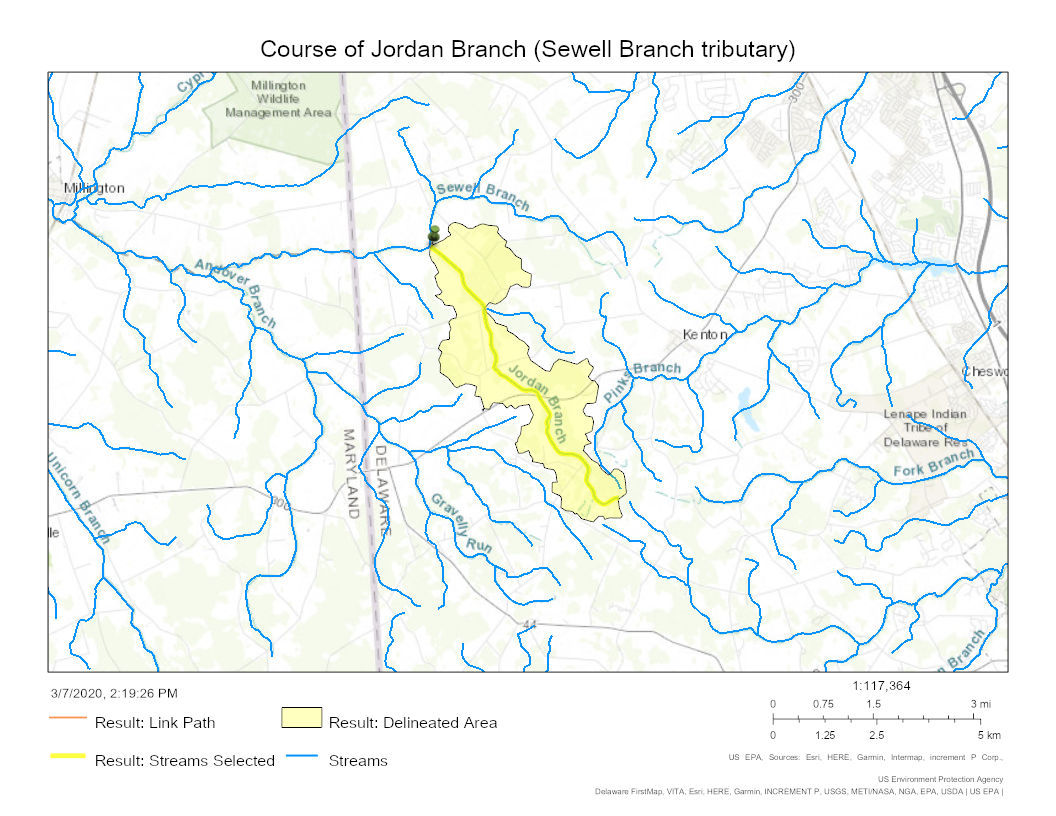
Course of Jordan Branch (Sewell Branch tributary)

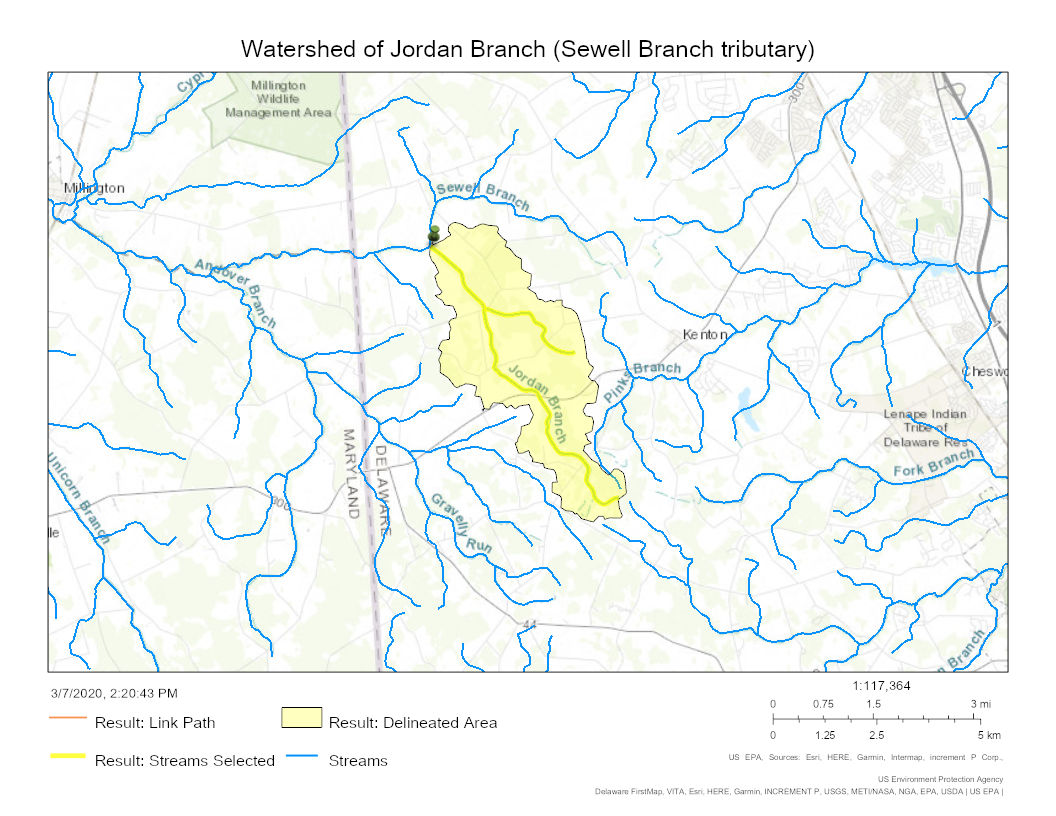
Watershed of Jordan Branch (Sewell Branch tributary)
