= Pinks Branch =

Pinks Branch Tributary to Leipsic River
- Location within Delaware Location within the United States

Location
- Country: United States
- State: Delaware
- County: Kent

Physical characteristics
- Source: Fork Branch divide
  - location: about 0.1 miles southwest of Shorts Corner, Delaware
  - coordinates: 39°11′41″N 075°40′50″W
  - elevation: 70 ft (21 m)
- Mouth: Leipsic River
  - location: about 1 mile east of Kenton, Delaware
  - coordinates: 39°13′55″N 075°38′11″W
  - elevation: 23 ft (7.0 m)
- Length: 7.52 mi (12.10 km)
- Basin size: 5.59 square miles (14.5 km^{2})
- Discharge
  - average: 9.03 cu ft/s (0.256 m^{3}/s) at mouth with Leipsic River

Basin features
- Progression: generally northeast
- River system: Leipsic River
- Tributaries
  - left: unnamed tributaries
  - right: unnamed tributaries
- Bridges: DE 11 (x 2), Judith Road, Shaws Corner Road, Seven Hickories Road

Pinks Branch is a 5.59 mi (9.00 km) long 2nd order tributary to the Leipsic River in Kent County, Delaware.

== Variant names ==
According to the Geographic Names Information System, it has also been known historically as:

- Pinks Creek
- Wolfpit Branch

== Course ==
Pinks Branch rises on the Fork Branch divide about 0.1 miles southwest of Shorts Corner, Delaware.

== Watershed ==
Pinks Branch drains 5.59 square miles (14.5 km^{2}) of area, receives about 44.8 in/year of precipitation, has a topographic wetness index of 616.66 and is about 6.5% forested.

== See also ==
- List of rivers of Delaware

== Maps ==
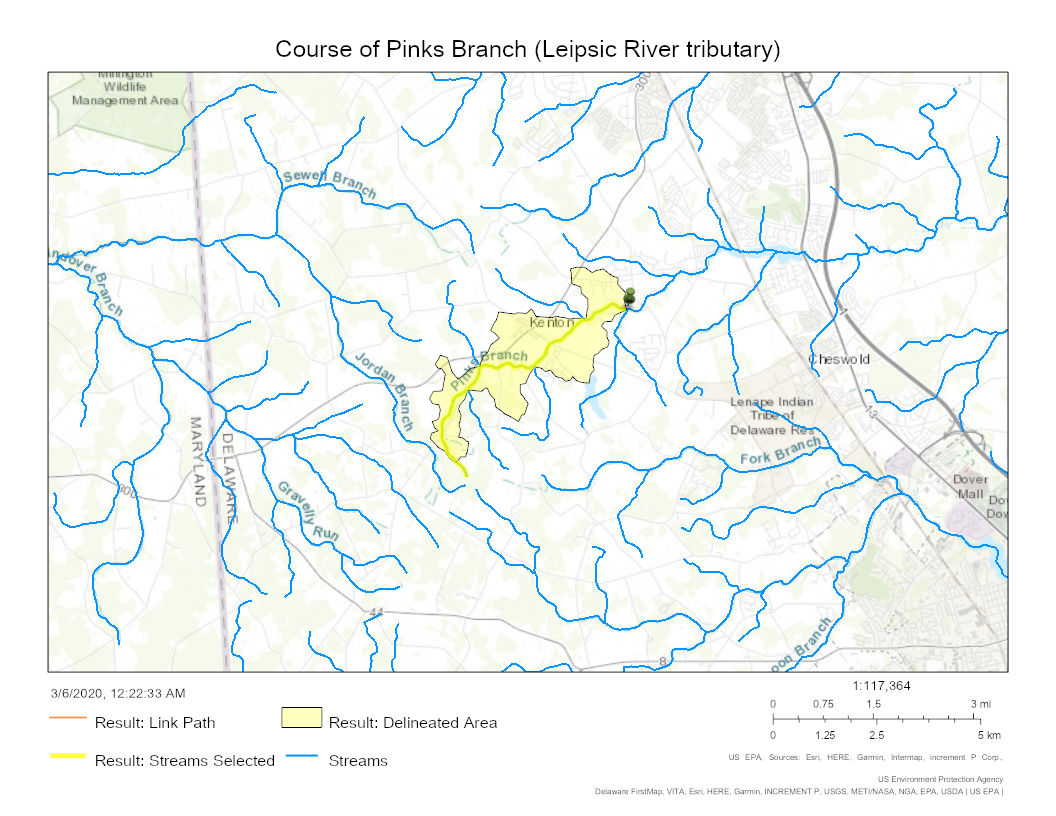
Pinks Branch (Leipsic River tributary)

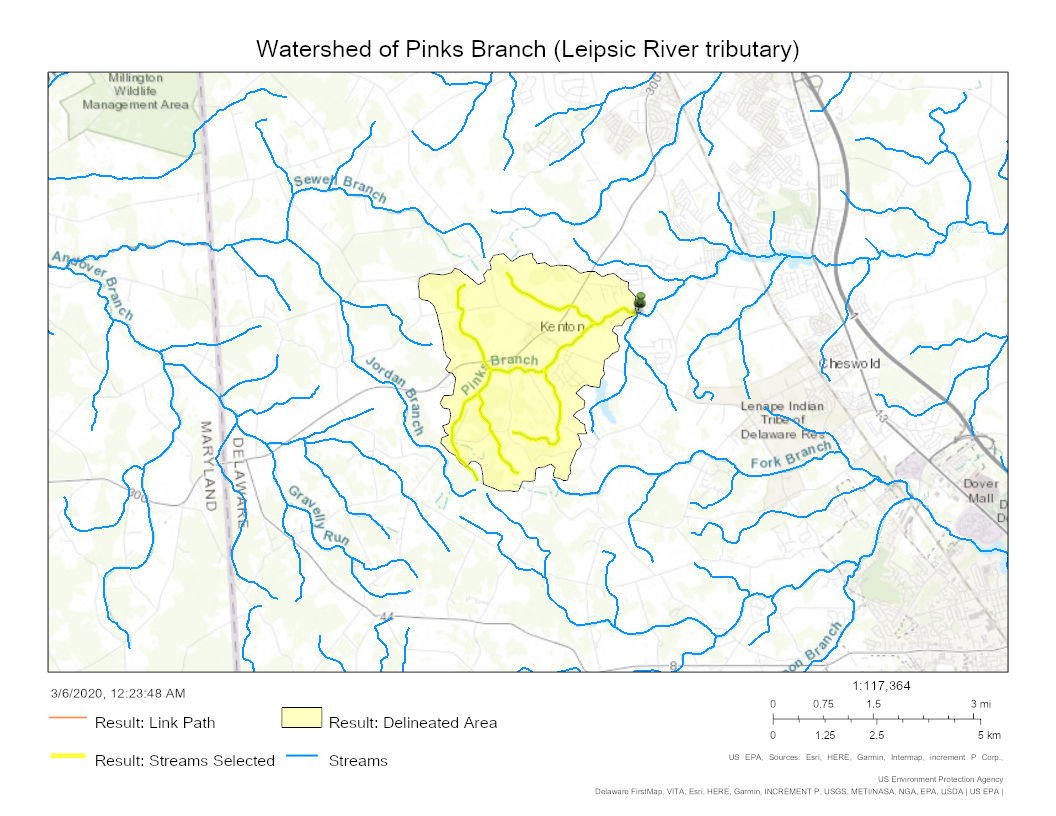
Watershed of Pinks Branch (Leipsic River tributary)
